= Compendium of postage stamp issuers (Po–Pz) =

Each "article" in this category is a collection of entries about several stamp issuers, presented in alphabetical order. The entries are formulated on the micro model and so provide summary information about all known issuers.

See the Category:Compendium of postage stamp issuers page for details of the project.

== Poland ==
Dates
1918 –
Capital
Warsaw
Currency
(1918) 100 fenigs = 1 mark
(1918) 100 hellers = 1 crown
(1924) 100 groszy = 1 zloty

Main Article Needed

Includes
Poland (Russian Province)

See also
General Gouvernement;
German Occupation Issues (WWI);
German Occupation Issues (WWII)

== Poland (German Occupation WWI) ==
Dates
1915 – 1918
Currency
100 pfennige = 1 mark

Refer
German Occupation Issues (WWI)

== Poland (German Occupation WWII) ==
Dates
1939 – 1945
Currency
100 groszy = 1 zloty

Refer
German Occupation Issues (WWII)

== Poland (Russian Province) ==
Dates
1860 – 1863
Capital
Warsaw
Currency
100 kopecks = 1 Russian ruble

Refer
Poland

== Polish Army in Russia ==
Dates
1942 only
Currency
100 kopecks = 1 Russian ruble

Refer
Polish Post Abroad

== Polish Corps in Russia ==
Dates
1918 only
Currency
100 kopecks = 1 Russian ruble

Refer
Polish Post Abroad

== Polish Government in Exile ==
Dates
1941 – 1945
Currency
100 groszy = 1 zloty

Refer
Polish Post Abroad

== Polish Military Post ==
Refer
Central Lithuania (Polish Occupation);
Polish Army in Russia;
Polish Corps in Russia

== Polish Occupation Issues ==
Refer
Polish Post Abroad

== Polish Post Abroad ==
Main Article Needed

Includes
Central Lithuania (Polish Occupation);
Constantinople (Polish Post Office);
Danzig (Polish Post Office);
Polish Army in Russia;
Polish Corps in Russia;
Polish Government in Exile

== Polska ==
Refer
Poland

== Pondicherry ==
Refer
French Indian Settlements

== Ponta Delgada ==
Dates
1892 – 1905
Currency
1000 reis = 1 milreis

Refer
Azores Territories

== Poonch ==
Dates
1876 – 1894
Currency
12 pies = 1 anna; 16 annas = 1 rupee

Refer
Indian Native States

== Port Arthur & Dairen ==
Dates
1946 – 1950
Currency
100 cents = 1 dollar

Refer
CPR Regional Issues

== Port Gdansk ==
Refer
Danzig (Polish Post Office)

== Port Lagos (French Post Office) ==
French PO in Thrace when under Turkish rule. Issued French stamps overprinted PORT-LAGOS. The office closed in 1898. Port Lagos is a seaport in Western Thrace which now belongs to Greece.

Dates
1893 – 1898
Currency
100 centimes = 1 franc

Refer
French Post Offices in the Turkish Empire

== Port Said (French Post Office) ==
Dates
1899 – 1931
Currency
(1899) 100 centimes = 1 franc
(1921) 1000 milliemes = 1 pound

Refer
Egypt (French Post Offices)

== Portugal ==
Dates
1853 –
Capital
Lisbon
Currency
(1853) 1000 reis = 1 milreis
(1912) 100 centavos = 1 escudo
(2002) 100 cent = 1 euro

Main Article Needed

See also
Africa (Portuguese Colonies);
Angola;
Azores;
Cape Verde Islands;
Guinea–Bissau;
Macao;
Madeira;
Mozambique;
Portuguese Congo;
Portuguese Guinea;
Portuguese India;
Sao Tome e Principe;
Timor

== Portuguese Africa ==
Refer
Africa (Portuguese Colonies)

== Portuguese Congo ==
Dates
1894 – 1920
Capital
Cabinda
Currency
(1894) 1000 reis = 1 milreis
(1912) 100 centavos = 1 escudo

Main Article Needed

See also
Africa (Portuguese Colonies)

== Portuguese Guinea ==
Dates
1881 – 1974
Capital
Bissau
Currency
(1881) 1000 reis = 1 milreis
(1912) 100 centavos = 1 escudo

Main Article Needed

See also
Africa (Portuguese Colonies);
Guinea–Bissau

== Portuguese India ==
Portugal sought territory in India after Vasco da Gama's successful voyage round the Cape of Good Hope in 1497–1498. The three enclaves of Goa (1505), Damao (1531) and Diu (1534) were annexed to collectively form the colony of Portuguese India.

Goa, including the capital Pangim (now Panaji), is on the Malabar Coast of SW India, roughly midway between Bombay and Bangalore. Damao (now called Daman) is on the west coast, at the entrance to the Gulf of Cambay, about 100 miles north of Bombay. Diu, which includes the towns of Diu and Simbor, is a small island (15 sq. miles) off the south coast of Kathiawar peninsula in western India.

The first stamps were issued 1 October 1871. Stamps of British India were also valid until 1877. Standard Portuguese types such as the Ceres issue were used until 1925 when specific types began to be produced. All stamps were inscribed INDIA in some way; from 1946, the inscription was usually ESTADO DA INDIA.

In 1950, newly independent India demanded the transfer of the Portuguese territories but Portugal refused. India set up a land blockade in 1954 and then annexed the territories on 17 December 1961. Stamps of India were introduced on 29 December 1961.

Goa became a State of India in 1987 while Daman and Diu (combined) is a Union Territory.

Dates
1871 – 1961
Capital
Pangim (Goa)
Currency
(1871) 1000 reis = 1 milreis
(1882) 12 reis = 1 tanga; 16 tangas = 1 rupia
(1959) 100 centavos = 1 escudo

Main Article
Postage stamps and postal history of Portuguese India

== Portuguese Occupation of German East Africa ==
Refer
German East Africa (Portuguese Occupation)

== Portuguese Timor ==
Refer
Timor

== Preussen ==
Refer
Prussia

== Priamur & Maritime Provinces ==
Dates
1921 – 1922
Capital
Vladivostok
Currency
100 kopecks = 1 Russian ruble

Refer
Russian Civil War Issues

== Prince Edward Island ==
Dates
1861 – 1873
Capital
Charlottetown
Currency
(1861) 12 pence = 1 shilling; 20 shillings = 1 pound
(1872) 100 cents = 1 dollar

Refer
Canadian Provinces

== Protectorat Français ==
Refer
French Protectorate, Morocco

== Prussia ==
Dates
1850 – 1867
Capital
Berlin
Currency
(1850) 12 pfennige = 1 silbergroschen; 30 silbergroschen = 1 thaler
(1867) 60 kreuzer = 1 gulden

Main Article Needed

See also
Germany (Imperial);
North German Confederation

== Puerto Rico ==
Dates
1873 – 1900
Capital
San Juan
Currency
(1873) 100 centimos = 1 peseta
(1881) 1000 milesimas = 100 centavos = 1 peso
(1898) 100 cents = 1 dollar

Main Article Needed

See also
Cuba & Puerto Rico

== Pulau Pinang ==
Refer
Penang

== Puttiala ==
Refer
Patiala

== Bibliography ==
- Stanley Gibbons Ltd, Europe and Colonies 1970, Stanley Gibbons Ltd, 1969
- Stanley Gibbons Ltd, various catalogues
- Stuart Rossiter & John Flower, The Stamp Atlas, W H Smith, 1989
- XLCR Stamp Finder and Collector's Dictionary, Thomas Cliffe Ltd, c.1960
