= Compendium of postage stamp issuers (Ga–Ge) =

Each "article" in this category is a collection of entries about several stamp issuers, presented in alphabetical order. The entries are formulated on the micro model and so provide summary information about all known issuers.

See the Category:Compendium of postage stamp issuers page for details of the project.

== Gabon ==
Dates
1959 –
Capital
Libreville
Currency
100 centimes = 1 franc

Includes
Gabon (French Colony)

See also
French Equatorial Africa

== Gabon (French Colony) ==
Dates
1886 – 1937
Capital
Libreville
Currency
100 centimes = 1 franc

Refer
Gabon

== Galápagos Islands ==
Dates
1957 – 1959
Capital
San Cristóbal (Puerto Baquerizo)
Currency
100 centavos = 1 sucre

Main Article

See also
Ecuador

== Galata ==
Refer
Constantinople (Russian Post Office)

== Galicia ==
Refer
West Ukraine

== Gambia ==
Dates
1869 –
Capital
Banjul (formerly Bathurst)
Currency
(1869) 12 pence = 1 shilling; 20 shillings = 1 pound
(1971) 100 bututs = 1 dalasy

Main Article
Postage stamps and postal history of the Gambia

== Gaspé ==
Refer
New Carlisle (Gaspé)

== Gaza (Egyptian Occupation) ==
Dates
1948 – 1967
Currency
1000 milliemes = 100 piastres = 1 Egyptian pound

Refer
Egyptian Occupation Issues

== Gaza (Indian UN Force) ==
Dates
1965 only
Currency
100 paisa = 1 rupee

Refer
Indian Overseas Forces

== Gdansk ==
Refer
Danzig (Polish Post Office)

== GEA ==
Refer
German East Africa

== General Gouvernement ==
Refer
Poland (German Occupation World War II)

== General Postal Union ==
Refer
Universal Postal Union (UPU)

== Geneva ==
Dates
1843 – 1850
Currency
100 centimes = 1 franc

Refer
Swiss Cantonal Issues

See also
League of Nations (Geneva);
United Nations (UN)

== Georgia ==
Dates
1993 –
Capital
Tbilisi
Currency
(1993) 100 kopecks = 1 Russian ruble
(1993) 100 tetri = 1 lari

Main Article
Postage stamps and postal history of Georgia

Includes
Georgia (pre – Soviet)

See also
Transcaucasian Federation;
Union of Soviet Socialist Republics (USSR)

== Georgia (pre-Soviet) ==
Dates
1919 – 1923
Capital
Tbilisi
Currency
100 kopecks = 1 Georgian rouble

Refer
Georgia

See also
Transcaucasian Federation;
Union of Soviet Socialist Republics (USSR)

== German Cameroun ==
Refer
Kamerun

== German Colonies ==
Main Article
Postage stamps and postal history of the German colonies

Includes
Caroline Islands;
German East Africa;
German New Guinea;
German Samoa;
German South West Africa;
German Togo;
Kamerun;
Kiautschou;
Mariana Islands (Marianen);
Marshall Islands (German Colony)

== German Commands ==
Refer
Eastern Command Area;
Western Command Area

== German East Africa ==
Dates
1893 – 1916
Capital
Dar-es-Salaam
Currency
(1893) 64 pesa = 100 heller = 1 rupee
(1905) 100 heller = 1 rupee

Refer
German Colonies

See also
German East Africa (Belgian Occupation);
German East Africa (British Occupation);
Tanganyika

== German East Africa (Belgian Occupation) ==
Dates
1916 – 1918
Currency
100 centimes = 1 franc

Refer
Belgian Occupation Issues

== German East Africa (British Occupation) ==
Dates
1917 only
Currency
100 cents = 1 rupee

Refer
British Occupation Issues

== German East Africa (Portuguese Occupation) ==
Refer
Kionga

== German Levant ==
Refer
German Post Offices in the Turkish Empire

== German New Guinea ==
Dates
1898 – 1914
Capital
Rabaul
Currency
100 pfennige = 1 mark

Refer
German Colonies

See also
Papua New Guinea

== German Ninth Army Post ==
Dates
1918 only
Currency
100 bani = 1 leu

Refer
German Occupation Issues (World War I)

See also
Rumania (German Occupation)

== German Occupation Issues (World War I) ==
Dates
1914 – 1918

Main Article

Includes
Belgium (German Occupation);
Dorpat (German Occupation);
Eastern Command Area;
German Ninth Army Post;
Poland (German Occupation World War I);
Rumania (German Occupation);
Western Command Area

== German Occupation Issues (World War II) ==
Dates
1939 – 1945

Main Article

Includes
Albania (German Occupation);
Alsace (German Occupation);
Dalmatia (German Occupation);
Estonia (German Occupation);
Laibach (German Occupation);
Latvia (German Occupation);
Lithuania (German Occupation);
Lorraine (German Occupation);
Luxembourg (German Occupation);
Macedonia (German Occupation);
Montenegro (German Occupation);
Ostland;
Poland (German Occupation World War II);
Serbia (German Occupation);
Ukraine (German Occupation);
Zante (German Occupation)

== German Post Offices Abroad ==
Main Article
German post offices abroad

Includes
China (German Post Offices);
German Post Offices in the Turkish Empire;
Morocco (German Post Offices);
Zanzibar (German Postal Agency)

== German Post Offices in the Turkish Empire ==
Dates
1884 – 1914
Currency
(1884) 40 paras = 1 piastre
(1908) 100 centimes = 1 franc

Refer
German Post Offices Abroad

== German Samoa ==
Dates
1900 – 1914
Capital
Apia
Currency
100 pfennige = 1 mark

Refer
German Colonies

== German South West Africa ==
Dates
1888 – 1915
Capital
Windhoek
Currency
100 pfennige = 1 mark

Refer
German Colonies

See also
Namibia;
South West Africa

== German States ==
Main Article

Includes
Bergedorf;
Bremen;
Brunswick;
Hamburg;
Hanover;
Holstein;
Lübeck;
Mecklenburg-Schwerin;
Mecklenburg-Strelitz;
Oldenburg;
Saxony;
Schleswig;
Schleswig-Holstein;
Thurn & Taxis

See also
Baden;
Bavaria;
Germany (Imperial);
North German Confederation;
Prussia;
Württemberg

== German Togo ==
Dates
1897 – 1914
Capital
Lomé
Currency
100 pfennige = 1 mark

Refer
German Colonies

== Germany ==
Dates
1991 –
Capital
Berlin
Currency
(1991) 100 pfennige = 1 mark (DM)
(2002) 100 cent = 1 euro

Main Article
Postage stamps and postal history of Germany

See also
Germany (Allied Occupation);
Germany (Imperial);
Germany (Third Reich);
Germany (Weimar Republic);
East Germany;
West Berlin;
West Germany

== Germany (Allied Occupation) ==
Dates
1945 – 1949

Main Article

Includes
American, British & Russian Zones (General Issues);
Anglo-American Zones (Civil Government);
Anglo-American Zones (Military Government);
Baden (French Zone);
Berlin – Brandenburg (Russian Zone);
French Zone (General Issues);
Mecklenburg-Vorpommern (Russian Zone);
North West Saxony (Russian Zone);
Rhineland-Palatinate (French Zone);
Russian Zone (General Issues);
Saar (French Zone);
Saxony (Russian Zone);
South East Saxony (Russian Zone);
Thuringia (Russian Zone);
Württemberg (French Zone)

See also
East Germany;
Germany;
West Berlin;
West Germany

== Germany (Belgian Occupation) ==
Dates
1919 – 1920
Currency
100 centimes = 1 franc

Refer
Belgian Occupation Issues

See also
Eupen & Malmedy (Belgian Occupation)

== Germany (Imperial) ==
Dates
1872 – 1919
Capital
Berlin
Currency
100 pfennige = 1 Reichsmark

Main Article

See also
Germany;
Germany (Allied Occupation);
Germany (Third Reich);
Germany (Weimar Republic);
East Germany;
West Berlin;
West Germany

== Germany (Third Reich) ==
Dates
1933 – 1945
Capital
Berlin
Currency
100 pfennige = 1 Reichsmark

Main Article

See also
Germany;
Germany (Allied Occupation);
Germany (Imperial);
Germany (Weimar Republic);
East Germany;
West Berlin;
West Germany

== Germany (Weimar Republic) ==
Dates
1919 – 1932
Capital
Berlin
Currency
100 pfennige = 1 Reichsmark

Main Article

See also
Germany;
Germany (Allied Occupation);
Germany (Imperial);
Germany (Third Reich);
East Germany;
West Berlin;
West Germany

== Bibliography ==
- Stanley Gibbons Ltd, Europe and Colonies 1970, Stanley Gibbons Ltd, 1969
- Stanley Gibbons Ltd, various catalogues
- Stuart Rossiter & John Flower, The Stamp Atlas, W H Smith, 1989
- XLCR Stamp Finder and Collector's Dictionary, Thomas Cliffe Ltd, c.1960
