= Compendium of postage stamp issuers (Sc–Sl) =

Each "article" in this category is a collection of entries about several stamp issuers, presented in alphabetical order. The entries are formulated on the micro model and so provide summary information about all known issuers.

See the Category:Compendium of postage stamp issuers page for details of the project.

== Scarpanto ==
Refer
Karpathos

== Schleswig ==
Dates
1864 – 1868
Capital
Schleswig
Currency
16 schilling = 1 mark

Refer
German States

== Schleswig-Holstein ==
Dates
1850 – 1868
Capital
Kiel
Currency
16 schilling = 1 mark

Refer
German States

== Schweizer-Renecke ==
Dates
1900 only
Capital
Schweizer-Renecke
Currency
12 pence = 1 shilling; 20 shillings = 1 pound

Refer
Transvaal

== Scinde ==
Dates
1852 – 1854
Currency
12 pies = 1 anna; 16 annas = 1 rupee

Refer
Indian Native States

== Scotland ==
Dates
1958 –
Capital
Edinburgh
Currency
(1958) 12 pence = 1 shilling; 20 shillings = 1 pound
(1971) 100 pence = 1 pound

Refer
Great Britain (Regional Issues)

== Scott Expedition ==
Refer
Victoria Land

== Scutari (Italian Post Office) ==
Dates
1909 – 1915
Currency
40 paras = 1 piastre

Refer
Italian Post Offices in the Turkish Empire

== SDD ==
Refer
Dodecanese Islands (Greek Occupation)

== Seiyun ==
Refer
Kathiri State of Seiyun

== Selangor ==
Dates
1881 –
Capital
Kuala Lumpur
Currency
100 cents = 1 dollar

Main Article Needed

See also
Malaysia

== Semyonov Regime ==
Refer
Ataman Semyonov Regime (Transbaikal)

== Senegal ==
Dates
1960 –
Capital
Dakar
Currency
100 centimes = 1 franc

Main Article Needed

Includes
Senegal (French Colony)

See also
French West Africa;
Mali Federation

== Senegal (French Colony) ==
Dates
1887 –
Capital
Dakar
Currency
100 centimes = 1 franc

Refer
Senegal

== Senegambia & Niger ==
Dates
1903 – 1906
Capital
Dakar
Currency
100 centimes = 1 franc

Refer
French Soudan

== Serbia ==
Dates
1866 – 1920; 2006 –
Capital
Belgrade
Currency
100 paras = 1 dinar

Main Article Postage stamps and postal history of Serbia

Includes
Serbia (Yugoslav Regional Issues)

See also
Yugoslavia

== Serbia (Austrian Occupation) ==
Dates
1916 only
Currency
100 heller = 1 krone

Refer
Austro–Hungarian Military Post

== Serbia (German Occupation) ==
Dates
1941 – 1944
Currency
100 paras = 1 dinar

Refer
German Occupation Issues (WW2)

== Serbia (Yugoslav Regional Issues) ==
Dates
1944 – 1946
Capital
Belgrade
Currency
100 filler = 1 pengo

Refer
Serbia

== Serbian Occupation Issues ==
Main Article Needed

Includes
Baranya (Serbian Occupation);
Hungary (Serbian Occupation);
Temesvar (Serbian Occupation)

== Serbia & Montenegro ==
Dates
2003 – 2006
Capital
Belgrade
Currency
100 paras = 1 dinar

Main Article Needed

See also
Montenegro
Serbia;
Yugoslavia;

== Seychelles ==
Dates
1890 –
Capital
Victoria
Currency
100 cents = 1 rupee

Main Article Postage stamps and postal history of Seychelles

See also
British Indian Ocean Territory;
Zil Elwannyen Sesel

== Seychelles Outer Islands ==
Refer
Zil Elwannyen Sesel

== Shackleton Expedition ==
Refer
King Edward VII Land

== Shahpura ==
Dates
1914 – 1920
Capital
Currency
12 pies = 1 anna; 16 annas = 1 rupee

Refer
Indian Native States

== Shanghai ==
Dates
1865 – 1898
Currency
(1865) 10 cash = 1 candareen, 100 candareens = 1 tael
(1890) 100 cents = 1 dollar

Main Article Needed

See also
Chinese Empire

== Shanghai (US Postal Agency) ==
Dates
1919 – 1922
Currency
100 cents = 1 dollar

Refer
US Post Abroad

== Sharjah ==
Issues of 1968–72 were non-postal and are unrecognised.

Dates
1963 – 1968
Currency
(1963) 100 naye paise = 1 rupee
(1966) 100 dirhams = 1 riyal.

Refer
Trucial States

== Shensi-Kansu-Ninghsia ==
Dates
1946 – 1949
Currency
100 cents = 1 dollar

Refer
CPR Regional Issues

== Sherifian Post ==
Dates
1912 – 1919
Currency
400 moussonats = 1 rial

Refer
Morocco

== Shihr & Mukalla ==
Refer
Qu'Aiti State of Shihr & Mukalla

== Shqip– ==
Prefix denoting Albania. Stamps use various suffixes.

Refer
Albania

== SHS ==
Refer
Srba Hrvata Slovena

== Siam ==
Dates
1883 – 1939
Capital
Bangkok
Currency
(1883) 32 solot = 16 atts = 8 sio = 4 sik = 2 fuang = 1 salung;
4 salungs = 1 tical
(1909) 100 satangs = 1 tical
(1912) 100 satangs = 1 baht

Refer
Thailand

== Siam (Thailand) ==
Dates
1947 – 1950
Capital
Bangkok
Currency
100 satangs = 1 baht

Refer
Thailand

== Siam (British Post Offices) ==
Refer
Bangkok (British Post Office)

== Siberia ==
Refer
Russian Civil War Issues

== Siberia (Czechoslovak Army) ==
Dates
1919 – 1920
Currency
100 kopecks = 1 Russian ruble

Refer
Russian Civil War Issues

== Sicily ==
Dates
1859 – 1860
Capital
Palermo
Currency
100 grana = 1 ducato

Refer
Italian States

== Sierra Leone ==
Dates
1859 –
Capital
Freetown
Currency
(1859) 12 pence = 1 shilling; 20 shillings = 1 pound
(1964) 100 cents = 1 rupee

Main Article Postage stamps and postal history of Sierra Leone

== Sikkim ==
Unofficial issues only.

Refer
India

== Silesia ==
Refer
East Silesia;
Upper Silesia

== Simi ==
Refer
Syme

== Sind ==
Refer
Scinde

== Singapore ==
Dates
1948 –
Capital
Singapore
Currency
100 cents = 1 dollar

Main Article Postage stamps and postal history of Singapore

== Sinkiang ==
Within Sinkiang province was the short-lived Ili Republic, which issued some unofficial stamps 1945–49.

Dates
1915 – 1949
Currency
100 cents = 1 dollar

Refer
Chinese Provinces

== Sirmoor ==
Dates
1879 – 1902
Currency
12 pice = 1 anna; 16 annas = 1 rupee

Refer
Indian Native States

== Sint Maarten ==
Dates
2010 -
Capital
Philipsburg
Currency
100 cents = 1 gulden (florin)

See also
Curaçao (Curaçao and Dependencies);
Netherlands Antilles;

== Slesvig ==
Dates
1920 only
Capital
Schleswig
Currency
Danish and German used concurrently

Refer
Plebiscite Issues

== Slovakia ==
In 1993, the federation of Czechoslovakia was dissolved and Slovakia became an independent republic with Michal Kovác as its first president.

Dates
1993 –
Capital
Bratislava
Currency
100 haleru = 1 koruna

Main Article Postage stamps and postal history of Slovakia

Includes
Slovakia (Autonomous State)

See also
Czechoslovakia;
Czech Republic

== Slovakia (Autonomous State) ==
Dates
1939 – 1945
Capital
Bratislava
Currency
100 haleru = 1 koruna

Refer
Slovakia

== Slovenia ==
Formerly part of the Austro-Hungarian Empire, Slovenia was combined with other areas in 1918 to form Yugoslavia. After occupation by Italy and Germany in WW2, it was returned to Yugoslavia in 1945. In 1991, Slovenia seceded from the Yugoslav federation and became an independent republic.

Dates
1991 –
Capital
Ljubljana
Currency
euro

Main Article Postage stamps and postal history of Slovenia

Includes
Slovenia (Provincial Issues);
Slovenia (Yugoslav Regional Issues)

See also
Yugoslavia

== Slovenia (Provincial Issues) ==
Dates
1919 – 1921
Capital
Ljubljana
Currency
100 vinar = 1 krona

Refer
Slovenia

== Slovenia (Yugoslav Regional Issues) ==
Dates
1945 – 1946
Capital
Ljubljana
Currency
German, Italian and Hungarian used concurrently

Refer
Slovenia

== Slovenia (German Occupation) ==
Refer
Laibach (German Occupation)

== Slovenia (Italian Occupation) ==
Refer
Lubiana (Italian Occupation)

== Bibliography ==
- Stanley Gibbons Ltd, Europe and Colonies 1970, Stanley Gibbons Ltd, 1969
- Stanley Gibbons Ltd, various catalogues
- Stuart Rossiter & John Flower, The Stamp Atlas, W H Smith, 1989
- XLCR Stamp Finder and Collector's Dictionary, Thomas Cliffe Ltd, c.1960
