= Compendium of postage stamp issuers (W) =

Each "article" in this category is a collection of entries about several stamp issuers, presented in alphabetical order. The entries are formulated on the micro model and so provide summary information about all known issuers.

See the Category:Compendium of postage stamp issuers page for details of the project.

== Wadhwan ==
Dates
1888 – 1892
Currency
4 pice = 1 anna

Refer
Indian Native States

== Wake Island ==
Currency
100 cents = 1 dollar (US)

Refer
United States of America (USA)

== Wales ==
Dates
1958 –
Capital
Cardiff
Currency
(1958) 12 pence = 1 shilling; 20 shillings = 1 pound
(1971) 100 pence = 1 pound

Refer
Great Britain (Regional Issues)

== Wallachia ==
Refer
Moldo–Wallachia

== Wallis & Futuna Islands ==
Dates
1920 –
Capital
Matauta
Currency
100 centimes = 1 franc

Main Article Postage stamps and postal history of Wallis and Futuna

== Walvis Bay ==
Refer
South West Africa

== Wenden ==
Dates
1863 – 1901
Currency
100 kopecks = 1 Russian ruble

Main Article Needed

== West Berlin ==
Dates
1948 – 1991
Currency
100 pfennige = 1 mark

Main Article Deutsche Bundespost Berlin

== West Germany ==
Dates
1949 – 1991
Capital
Bonn
Currency
100 pfennige = 1 mark

Main Article Deutsche Bundespost

== West Irian ==
Dates
1963 – 1970
Capital
Hollandia
Currency
100 sen = 1 rupiah

Main Article Needed

Includes
Western New Guinea

See also
Indonesia;
Netherlands Indies

== Western New Guinea ==
Dates
1962 – 1963
Capital
Hollandia
Currency
100 cents = 1 gulden

Refer
West Irian

== West Ukraine ==
Dates
1918 – 1919
Capital
Lemberg (Lviv)
Currency
100 heller = 1 krone

Main Article Needed

== Western Army ==
Dates
1919 – 1920
Currency
100 kopecks = 1 Russian ruble

Refer
Russian Civil War Issues

== Western Australia ==
Dates
1854 – 1912
Capital
Perth
Currency
12 pence = 1 shilling; 20 shillings = 1 pound

Main Article Needed

See also
Australia

== Western Command Area ==
Dates
1916 – 1918
Currency
100 centimes = 1 franc

Refer
German Occupation Issues (World War I)

== Western Samoa ==
Dates
1935 – 1958
Capital
Apia
Currency
12 pence = 1 shilling; 20 shillings = 1 pound

Refer
Samoa

== Western Thrace ==
Dates
1913 only
Capital
Dedêagatz (now Alexandroupoli)
Currency
40 paras = 1 piastre

Refer
Thrace

See also
Dedêagatz (Greek Occupation);
Eastern Thrace;
Greek Occupation Issues;
Gumultsina;
Thrace (Allied Occupation);
Western Thrace (Greek Occupation)

== Western Thrace (Greek Occupation) ==
Dates
1920 only
Capital
Dedêagatz (now Alexandroupoli)
Currency
100 lepta = 1 drachma

Refer
Thrace

See also
Dedêagatz (Greek Occupation);
Greek Occupation Issues;
Gumultsina;
Thrace (Allied Occupation);
Western Thrace

== White Russia ==
Refer
Belarus

== Windward Islands ==
Capital
St George's, Grenada

Refer
Grenada;
St Lucia;
St Vincent

== Wolmaransstad ==
Dates
1900 only
Currency
12 pence = 1 shilling; 20 shillings = 1 pound

Refer
Transvaal

== World Health Organization ==
Dates
1948 – 1975
Currency
100 centimes = 1 franc

Refer
International Organisations

== World Intellectual Property Organisation ==
Dates
1982 only
Currency
100 centimes = 1 franc

Refer
International Organisations

== World Meteorological Organisation ==
Dates
1956 – 1973
Currency
100 centimes = 1 franc

Refer
International Organisations

== Wrangel Government ==
Dates
1920 – 1921
Capital
Sevastopol
Currency
100 kopecks = 1 Russian ruble

Refer
Russian Civil War Issues

== Württemberg ==
Dates
1851 – 1924
Capital
Stuttgart
Currency
(1851) 60 kreuzer = 1 gulden
(1875) 100 pfennige = 1 mark

Main Article Needed

== Württemberg (French Zone) ==
Dates
1947 – 1949
Capital
Stuttgart
Currency
100 pfennige = 1 mark

Refer
Germany (Allied Occupation)

== Bibliography ==
- Stanley Gibbons Ltd, Europe and Colonies 1970, Stanley Gibbons Ltd, 1969
- Stanley Gibbons Ltd, various catalogues
- Stuart Rossiter & John Flower, The Stamp Atlas, W H Smith, 1989
- XLCR Stamp Finder and Collector's Dictionary, Thomas Cliffe Ltd, c.1960
