= Compendium of postage stamp issuers (U) =

Each "article" in this category is a collection of entries about several stamp issuers, presented in alphabetical order. The entries are formulated on the micro model and so provide summary information about all known issuers.

See the Category:Compendium of postage stamp issuers page for details of the project.

== UAE ==
Refer
United Arab Emirates (UAE)

== UAR ==
Refer
United Arab Republic (UAR)

== Ubangi-Shari ==
Refer
Oubangui-Chari

== Ubangi-Shari-Chad ==
Refer
Oubangui-Chari-Tchad

== Uganda ==
Dates
1962 –
Capital
Kampala
Currency
100 cents = 1 shilling

Main Article Postage stamps and postal history of Uganda

See also
British East Africa;
Kenya Uganda & Tanzania (Combined Issues)

== Uganda Protectorate ==
Dates
1895 – 1902
Capital
Entebbe
Currency
(1895) 1000 cowries = 2 rupees
(1896) 16 annas = 1 rupee

Refer
British East Africa

== United Kingdom ==
Refer
United Kingdom (UK)

== Ukraine ==
Dates
1992 –
Capital
Kyiv
Currency
(1992) karbovanets (coupon currency)
(1996) 100 kopiykas = 1 hyrvnia

Main Article Postage stamps and postal history of Ukraine

Includes
Ukraine (pre–Soviet);
Ukrainian Field Post;
Donetsk People's Republic

See also
Union of Soviet Socialist Republics (USSR)

== Ukraine (pre-Soviet) ==
Dates
1918 – 1923
Capital
Kiev
Currency
200 shahiv = 100 kopecks = 1 Russian ruble

Refer
Ukraine

== Ukraine (German Occupation) ==
Dates
1941 – 1944
Currency
100 pfennige = 1 mark

Refer
German Occupation Issues (WW2)

== Ukrainian Field Post ==
Dates
1920 only
Currency
100 shahiv = 1 grivna

Refer
Ukraine

== UKTT ==
Refer
Southern Cameroons

== Ultramar ==
Refer
Cuba;
Macao;
Portuguese Guinea;
Puerto Rico;
Spanish Guinea

== Umm Al Qiwain ==
Dates
1964 – 1967
Currency
(1964) 100 naye paise = 1 rupee
(1967) 100 dirhams = 1 riyal

Refer
Trucial States

== UN ==
Refer
United Nations (UN)

== UN Administration of West New Guinea ==
Refer
West New Guinea

== UNESCO ==
Dates
1961 – 1981
Currency
100 centimes = 1 franc

Refer
International Organisations

== Union Island ==
Refer
Grenadines of St Vincent

== Union Islands ==
Refer
Tokelau

== Union of Soviet Socialist Republics (USSR) ==
Dates
1923 – 1992
Capital
Moscow
Currency
100 kopecks = 1 Soviet ruble

Main Article Needed

Includes
USSR Issues for the Far East

See also
Armenia;
Azerbaijan;
Belarus;
Estonia;
Georgia;
Kazakhstan;
Kyrgyzstan;
Latvia;
Lithuania;
Moldova;
Russia;
Tajikistan;
Transcaucasian Federation;
Turkmenistan;
Ukraine;
Uzbekistan

== United Arab Emirates (UAE) ==
Dates
1973 –
Capital
Abu Dhabi
Currency
100 fils = 1 dirham

Main Article Postage stamps and postal history of the United Arab Emirates

See also
Abu Dhabi;
Dubai;
Trucial States

== United Arab Republic (UAR) ==
Dates
1958 – 1961
Capital
Cairo
Currency
1000 milliemes = 100 piastres = 1 pound

Refer
Egypt

== United Kingdom (UK) ==
This was historically called the United Kingdom of Great Britain and Ireland (1801–1922) after which it became the United Kingdom of Great Britain and Northern Ireland or UK for short.

It has never been a philatelic term, any more than England has, because the worldwide consensus among philatelists and postal authorities has been that the issuer of British stamps is called Great Britain.

Refer
Great Britain
Great Britain (Regional issues)

== United Kingdom Trust Territory (UKTT) ==
Refer
Southern Cameroons

== United Nations (UN) ==
Dates
1951 –
Currency
American, Austrian or Swiss depending on location

Refer
International Organisations

== United States ==
Dates
1847 –
Capital
Washington, D.C.
Currency
100 cents = 1 dollar

See also
Confederate States of America

== United States of New Granada ==
Refer
New Granada

== Universal Postal Union (UPU) ==
Dates
1957 –
Currency
100 centimes = 1 franc (Swiss)

Refer
International Organisations

== Upper Senegal & Niger ==
Dates
1906 – 1921
Capital
Niamey
Currency
100 centimes = 1 franc

Refer
French Soudan

== Upper Silesia ==
Dates
1920 – 1922
Currency
100 pfennige = 1 mark

Refer
Plebiscite Issues

== Upper Volta ==
Dates
1959 – 1984
Capital
Ouagadougou
Currency
100 centimes = 1 franc

Main Article Needed

Includes
Upper Volta (French Colony)

See also
Burkina Faso;
French West Africa

== Upper Volta (French Colony) ==
Dates
1920 – 1933
Capital
Ouagadougou
Currency
100 centimes = 1 franc

Refer
Upper Volta

== Upper Yafa ==
Dates
1967 only
Currency
1000 fils = 1 dinar

Refer
Aden Protectorate States

== UPU ==
Refer
Universal Postal Union (UPU)

== Uruguay ==
Dates
1856 –
Capital
Montevideo
Currency
(1856) 120 centavos = 1 real
(1859) 1000 milesimos = 100 centesimos = 1 peso
(1975) 100 old pesos = 1 new peso

Main Article Postage stamps and postal history of Uruguay

== United States ==
Refer
United States of America (USA)

== US Post Abroad ==
Main Article Needed

Includes
Guam;
Philippines (US Administration);
Shanghai (US Postal Agency);
US Post Offices in Japan

== US Postal Agency in Shanghai ==
Refer
Shanghai (US Postal Agency)

== US Post Offices in Japan ==
Dates
1867 – 1874
Currency
100 cents = 1 dollar

Refer
US Post Abroad

== USSR ==
Refer
Union of Soviet Socialist Republics (USSR)
Main Article Stamps of the Soviet Union

== USSR Issues for the Far East ==
Dates
1923 only
Currency
100 kopecks = 1 Soviet ruble

Refer
Union of Soviet Socialist Republics (USSR)
Main Article Postage stamps and postal history of the Far Eastern Republic

== US Virgin Islands ==
Refer
Danish West Indies

== Uzbekistan ==
Dates
1992 –
Capital
Tashkent
Currency
(1992) 100 kopecks = 1 Soviet rouble
(June 1994) suom (coupon currency)
(Sept 1994) 100 tyin = 1 soum

Main Article Postage stamps and postal history of Uzbekistan

See also
Union of Soviet Socialist Republics (USSR)

== Bibliography ==
- Stanley Gibbons Ltd, Europe and Colonies 1970, Stanley Gibbons Ltd, 1969
- Stanley Gibbons Ltd, various catalogues
- Stuart Rossiter & John Flower, The Stamp Atlas, W H Smith, 1989
- XLCR Stamp Finder and Collector's Dictionary, Thomas Cliffe Ltd, c.1960
