= Compendium of postage stamp issuers (Al–Aq) =

Each "article" in this category is in fact a collection of entries about several stamp issuers, presented in alphabetical order. The entries themselves are formulated on the micro model and so provide summary information about all known issuers.

See the Category:Compendium of postage stamp issuers page for details of the project.

== Alexandropoulos ==
Now called Alexandroupoli, a city in Thrace, north-eastern Greece, formerly known as Dedêagatz aka Dédéagh. A French post office issued French stamps there from 1893 to 1913 when it was part of the Ottoman Empire. These were overprinted Dédéagh.

When Greek forces invaded Thrace in 1913 during the Second Balkan War, Bulgarian stamps in use there were overprinted with a Greek inscription and currency value.

Refer
Dedêagatz (French Post Offices);
Dedêagatz (Greek Occupation)

== Algeria ==
Former French colony which used stamps of France 1849–1924 and 1958–62.

Dates
1962 –
Capital
Algiers
Currency
100 centimes = 1 dinar
Main Article
Postage stamps and postal history of Algeria
Includes
Algeria (French Colony)

== Algeria (French Colony) ==
Used French stamps 1849–1924 and 1958–62. Independent republic with own issues from 1962.

Dates
1924 – 1958
Capital
Algiers
Currency
100 centimes = 1 franc
Refer
Algeria

== Allemagne Duitschland ==
Overprint on Belgian stamps issued by forces occupying part of western Germany in the aftermath of the First World War.

Refer
Germany (Belgian Occupation)

== Allenstein ==
A region of East Prussia (German territory) that was disputed at the end of the First World War. A plebiscite was held to decide if it should be in Germany or Poland. German stamps were issued during the period of the plebiscite with an overprint of PLEBISCITE OLSZTYN ALLENSTEIN. The vote was in favour of Germany but the region was incorporated within Poland after the Second World War and is now called Olsztyn.

Dates
1920 only
Currency
100 pfennige = 1 mark
Refer
Plebiscite Issues

== Allied Military Government for Trieste (AMG-FTT) ==
Allied Military Government issues for the Free Territory of Trieste following the Second World War.

Refer
Trieste

== Allied Military Government for Venezia Giulia (AMG-VG) ==
Allied Military Government issues for Venezia Giulia following the Second World War.

Refer
Venezia Giulia & Istria

== Allied Occupation Issues ==
Various issues by allied occupation forces.

Refer
Germany (Allied Occupation);
Thrace (Allied Occupation);
Togo (Anglo-French Occupation)

== Alsace (German Occupation) ==
During the German occupation in the Second World War, the authorities issued German stamps overprinted ELSASS.

Dates
1940 – 1941
Currency
100 pfennige = 1 mark
Refer
German Occupation Issues (WWII)

== Alsace-Lorraine ==
Area of eastern France taken over by Germany in the Franco-Prussian War. During 1870–1871, there was a single issue for the whole territory. Stamps of Germany replaced this and were used 1872–1918. The area was returned to France after World War I. French stamps have been used since 1918 except for the German occupation in World War II (1940–1944) when separate issues were made for Alsace and Lorraine.

Dates
1870 – 1871
Capital
Strasbourg
Currency
100 centimes = 1 franc
Main Article
Postage stamps and postal history of Alsace-Lorraine
See also
Alsace (German Occupation);
Lorraine (German Occupation)

== Alwar ==
Alwar was a feudatory state in Rajputana, northern India.

Dates
1877 only
Currency
12 pies = 1 anna; 16 annas = 1 rupee
Refer
Indian Native States

== AM Post ==
Overprint used by Anglo-American forces in Germany after the Second World War.

Refer
Anglo-American Zones (Military Government)

== America ==
In postal as in other terms, generally refers to the US, rather than to the continent.

Refer
United States of America (USA)

== American, British & Russian Zones (General Issues) ==
These issues were introduced in February 1946 to replace the joint British and American military issue and the various Russian provincial issues. The French Zone continued to issue separately. When currency reform took place in June 1948, the Russian Zone again began separate issues. The British and American Zones continued to use the same stamps until foundation of the German Federal Republic in September 1949.

Dates
1946 – 1948
Currency
100 pfennige = 1 Reichsmark
Refer
Germany (Allied Occupation)
See also
Anglo-American Zones (Civil Government);
Anglo-American Zones (Military Government);
Russian Zone (General Issues)

== American Samoa ==
No issues. USA stamps have been in use since the territory was taken over in 1900.

Refer
Samoa

== American Zone ==
No separate issues. From 1945–1949, always used the same stamps as the British Zone.

Refer
American, British & Russian Zones (General Issues);
Anglo-American Zones (Civil Government);
Anglo-American Zones (Military Government)

== AMG-FTT ==
Overprint used by Allied Military Government of the Free Territory of Trieste following the Second World War.

Refer
Trieste

== AMG-VG ==
Overprint used by Allied Military Government of Venezia Giulia following the Second World War.

Refer
Venezia Giulia & Istria

== Amirantes ==
A group of islands in the Indian Ocean, lying south west of the Seychelles.

Refer
British Indian Ocean Territory;
Zil Elwannyen Sesel

== Amur Province ==
Amur is an inland province of eastern Siberia, lying due north of Manchuria. In February 1920, a communist regime was set up. There was one issue of stamps with five values: 2, 3, 5, 15 and 30 rubles. The inscription (translated) reads Amur Province Postage Stamp. In April 1920, Amur was incorporated into the Far Eastern Republic.

Dates
1920 only
Capital
Blagoveshchensk
Currency
100 kopecks = 1 Russian ruble
Refer
Russian Civil War Issues
See also
Far Eastern Republic

== Andorra ==
Operates a dual postal system with both Spanish and French offices issuing their own stamps.

Capital
Andorra La Vella
Main Article
Postage stamps and postal history of Andorra
Includes
Andorra (French Post Offices);
Andorra (Spanish Post Offices)

== Andorra (French Offices) ==
Stamps issued by French post offices in Andorra.

Dates
1931 –
Currency
(1931) 100 centimes = 1 franc
(2002) 100 cent = 1 euro
Refer
Andorra

== Andorra (Spanish Offices) ==
Stamps issued by Spanish post offices in Andorra.

Dates
1928 –
Currency
(1928) 100 centimos = 1 peseta
(2002) 100 cent = 1 euro
Refer
Andorra

== Anglo-American Zones (Civil Government) ==
Various issues common to these zones from the reform of currency in June 1948 until the foundation of the Federal Republic in September 1949.

Dates
1948 – 1949
Currency
100 pfennige = 1 DM
Refer
Germany (Allied Occupation)
See also
American, British & Russian Zones (General Issues)

== Anglo-American Zones (Military Government) ==
A single issue with 35 values was used in both zones until the General Issues types (also used in the Russian Zone) appeared in February 1946. The Military Government issue was inscribed AM POST DEUTSCHLAND (AM = Allied Military).

Dates
1945 – 1946
Currency
100 pfennige = 1 RM
Refer
Germany (Allied Occupation)
See also
American, British & Russian Zones (General Issues)

== Anglo-French Occupation of Togo ==
Issues by military forces occupying Togo, then a German colony, in the First World War.

Refer
Togo (Anglo-French Occupation)

== Angola ==
Former Portuguese colony, independent since 1975.

Dates
1870 –
Capital
Luanda
Currency
(1870) 1000 réis = 1 mil réis
(1913) 100 centavos = 1 escudo
(1932) 100 centavos = 1 angolar (currency)
(1954) 100 centavos = 1 escudo
(1977) 100 lweis = 1 kwanza
Main Article
Postage stamps and postal history of Angola
See also
Africa (Portuguese Colonies)

== Angora (Ankara) ==
Sited in Anatolia, Angora (now Ankara) is the present capital city of Turkey. The European part of Turkey, including the then capital of Constantinople, was under Allied occupation 1918–1923 following the defeat of Turkey in World War I. A provisional nationalist government was established by Kemal Atatürk at Angora, which he declared to be the new capital. Having expelled the Greek invaders of Asia Minor (1921–1922) and averted a war with Britain (1923), Atatürk was able to proclaim the new republic of Turkey on 28 October 1923 with himself as president. Ankara was confirmed as the capital despite the reinstatement of Constantinople (now Istanbul) as Turkish territory. During the period of the provisional government (1920–1923), various overprints were issued at Angora. In 1922, two sets of definitives were issued (cat. nos A79-A90 and A119-A124). These were replaced by the general Turkish issue (cat. nos 974-1012) of November 1923.

Dates
1920 – 1923
Currency
40 paras = 1 piastre
Refer
Turkey

== Angra ==
Angra is one of the three administrative districts of the Azores, the others being Horta and Ponta Delgada. All are Portuguese territory. Portuguese stamps have always been used in Angra (i.e., since 1853). From 1868 to 1931, and since 1980, stamps of Azores have also been in use. The Angra stamps were two issues based on Portuguese definitives but with an inscription of ANGRA. Similar types were used in other Portuguese colonies.

Dates
1892 – 1905
Currency
1000 réis = 1 mil réis
Refer
Azores Territories

== Anguilla ==
Previously used stamps of Great Britain 1858–1960; Nevis 1861–1970; St Christopher 1870–1890; Leeward Islands 1890–1956; St Kitts-Nevis 1903–1952; and Saint Christopher-Nevis-Anguilla 1953–1969. The most northerly of the Leeward Islands, Anguilla was first colonised by English settlers in 1650. During Britain's wars with France in the 18th century, it was attacked twice by French forces (1745 and 1796) but they were repelled on both occasions. Anguilla was administered as part of the St Kitts-Nevis group but this was strongly resisted and Britain had to quell an independence movement in 1967. Anguilla finally became a separate entity on 19 December 1980, though it remains a British dependency.

Dates
1967 –
Capital
The Valley
Currency
100 cents = 1 dollar
Main Article
Postage stamps and postal history of Anguilla
See also
St Christopher Nevis & Anguilla;
Leeward Islands

== Anjouan ==
One of the larger Comoro Islands along with Grande Comore, Mayotte and Mohéli. Became a French protectorate in 1866, since when its history has been shared by the other islands in the Comoros group. Anjouan is now part of the Comoros Republic. Anjouan had three issues with 30 stamps in all. The inscription used was SULTANAT D'ANJOUAN.

All stamps were the French Colonies "Tablet" types.

Dates
1892 – 1914
Currency
100 centimes = 1 franc
Refer
Madagascar & Dependencies
See also
Comoro Islands

== Ankara ==
Anglicised name of Angora.

Refer
Angora

== Annam (Indochina) ==
Annam was the central province of Vietnam, lying between Tongking and Cochin China. One regional issue with 11 values was produced when the province was part of French Indochina. At the same time, there was a regional issue for Cambodia.

Dates
1936 only
Capital
Binh Dinh
Currency
100 cents = 1 piastre
Refer
Indochina Territories
See also
Cambodia (Indochina)

== Annam and Tongking ==
Refers to combined issues by French colonies of Annam and Tongking.

Dates
1888 – 1892
Capital
Hanoi
Currency
100 centimes = 1 franc
Main article
Postage stamps and postal history of Annam and Tongking
See also
Indochina Territories

== Antigua ==
Main island in the Antigua and Barbuda group.

Dates
1862 –
Capital
St John's
Currency
(1862) 12 pence = 1 shilling; 20 shillings = 1 pound
(1951) 100 cents = 1 dollar
Main article
Postage stamps and postal history of Antigua
Refer
Antigua & Barbuda

== Antigua and Barbuda ==
Antigua and Barbuda is the official name of an island group in the Leeward Islands which comprises Antigua, Barbuda and Redonda. It was first colonised by English settlers in 1632. During the 18th century, African slaves were imported to work on the sugar plantation and, as in other Caribbean islands, this created a predominantly black population. Slavery was ended in 1834. The country became independent of Britain on 1 November 1981.

Dates
1981 –
Capital
St John's (Antigua)
Currency
100 cents = 1 dollar
Main Article
Postage stamps and postal history of Antigua and Barbuda
Includes
Antigua;
Barbuda
See also
Leeward Islands

== Antioquia ==
Colombian territory which formerly had its own issues.

Dates
1868 – 1906
Capital
Medellín
Currency
100 centavos = 1 peso
Main Article
Postage stamps of Antioquia
Refer
Colombian Territories

== A.O. ==
Belgian Congo Red Cross issue overprint which means Afrique Orientale. Issued 15 May 1918 in Ruanda-Urundi under Belgian mandate.

== AOF ==
An acronym for Afrique Occidentale Française and used as an overprint on stamps of French West Africa.

Refer
French West Africa

== Bibliography ==
- Stanley Gibbons Ltd, various catalogues
- Stanley Gibbons Ltd, Europe and Colonies 1970, Stanley Gibbons Ltd, 1969
- Stuart Rossiter & John Flower, The Stamp Atlas, W H Smith, 1989
- XLCR Stamp Finder and Collector's Dictionary, Thomas Cliffe Ltd, c.1960
