= Compendium of postage stamp issuers (D) =

Each "article" in this category is a collection of entries about several stamp issuers, presented in alphabetical order. The entries are formulated on the micro model and so provide summary information about all known issuers.

See the Category:Compendium of postage stamp issuers page for details of the project.

== Dahomey ==
Dates
1899–1944; 1960–1975
Capital
Porto-Novo
Currency
100 centimes = 1 franc

Main Article

See also
Benin;
French West Africa

== Dai Nippon ==
Refer
Japanese Naval Control Area

== Dairen ==
Refer
Port Arthur & Dairen

== Dakar – Abidjan ==
Dates
1959 only
Currency
100 centimes = 1 franc

Refer
French West Africa

== Dalmatia (German Occupation) ==
Dates
1943 – 1945
Currency
100 centesimi = 1 lira
100 Pfennige = 1 Reichsmark

Refer
German Occupation Issues (WWII)

== Dalmatia (Italian Occupation) ==
Dates
1919 – 1923
Currency
100 centesimi = 1 corona

Refer
Italian Occupation Issues

== Damao ==
Refer
Portuguese India

== Danish West Indies ==
Dates
1855 – 1917
Capital
Charlotte Amalie (St Thomas)
Currency
(1855) 100 cents = 1 dollar = 5 Danish kroner
(1905) 100 bit = 1 franc = 1 Danish krone

Main Article
Postage stamps and postal history of the Danish West Indies

== Danubian Principalities ==
Refer
Moldo–Wallachia

== Danzig ==
Dates
1920 – 1939
Currency
(1920) 100 pfennige = 1 mark
(1923) 100 pfennige = 1 Danzig gulden

Refer
Free City of Danzig

Main Article
Postage stamps and postal history of Free City of Danzig

See also
Danzig (Polish Post Office)

== Danzig (Polish Post Office) ==
Dates
1924 – 1939
Currency
100 groszy = 1 zloty

Refer
Polish Post Abroad

== Dardanelles (Russian Post Office) ==
Dates
1909 – 1910
Currency
40 paras = 1 piastre

Refer
Russian Post Offices in the Turkish Empire

== Das Island ==
Refer
Abu Dhabi

== Datia ==
Refer
Duttia

== DDR ==
Refer
East Germany

== Debrecen (Romanian Occupation) ==
Dates
1919 – 1920
Currency
100 filler = 1 korona

Refer
Romanian Post Abroad

== Deccan ==
Refer
Hyderabad

== Dédéagh ==
Overprint used on French stamps issued by a French post office in the Thracian city of Dedêagatz (now called Alexandroupoli) when it was part of the Ottoman Empire.

Refer
Dedêagatz (French Post Offices)

== Dedêagatz (French Post Office) ==
The office issued French stamps with overprint of Dédéagh (see above) when Thrace was part of the Ottoman Empire.

Dates
1893 – 1914
Currency
French and Turkish used concurrently

Refer
French Post Offices in the Turkish Empire

== Dedêagatz (Greek Occupation) ==
When Greek forces invaded Thrace in 1913 during the Second Balkan War, Bulgarian stamps in use there were overprinted with a Greek inscription and currency value.

Dates
1913 only
Currency
100 lepta = 1 drachma

Refer
Thrace

See also
Greek Occupation Issues;
Gumultsina;
Western Thrace;
Western Thrace (Greek Occupation)

== Democratic Federation of Yugoslavia ==
Refer
Yugoslavia (Democratic Federation)

== Denikin Government ==
Dates
1919 – 1920
Currency
100 kopecks = 1 Russian ruble

Refer
Russian Civil War Issues

== Denmark ==
Dates
1851 –
Capital
Copenhagen
Currency
(1851) 96 rigsbank skilling (RBS)= 1 rigsdaler
(1875) 100 ore = 1 krone

== Deutsche Besetzung Zara ==
Refer
Dalmatia (German Occupation)

== Deutsche Demokratische Republik (DDR) ==
Refer
East Germany

== Deutsche Militarverwaltung Kotor ==
Refer
Dalmatia (German Occupation)

== Deutsche Post ==
Refer
East Germany

== Dhar ==
Dates
1897 – 1898
Currency
4 pies = 1 anna

Refer
Indian Native States

== Diego – Suarez ==
Dates
1890 – 1896
Currency
100 centimes = 1 franc

Refer
Madagascar & Dependencies

== Diu ==
Refer
Portuguese India

== Djibouti ==
Dates
1977 –
Capital
Djibouti
Currency
100 centimes = 1 franc

Main Article Postage stamps and postal history of Djibouti

Includes
Djibouti (French Colony);
Obock

See also
French Somali Coast;
French Territory of Afars & Issas

== Djibouti (French Colony) ==
Dates
1893 – 1902
Capital
Djibouti
Currency
100 centimes = 1 franc

Refer
Djibouti

== Dobruja (Bulgarian Occupation) ==
Dates
1916 only
Currency
100 stotinki (стотинки) = 1 lev (лев)

Refer
Bulgarian Territories

== Dodecanese Islands (British Occupation) ==
Refer
Middle East Forces

== Dodecanese Islands (Greek Occupation) ==
Dates
1947 only
Currency
100 lepta = 1 drachma

Refer
Greek Occupation Issues

See also
Aegean Islands (Dodecanese);
Middle East Forces

== Dominica ==
Dates
1874 –
Capital
Roseau
Currency
(1874) 12 pence = 1 shilling; 20 shillings = 1 pound
(1949) 100 cents = 1 dollar

Main Article Postage stamps and postal history of Dominica

== Dominican Republic ==
Dates
1865 –
Capital
Santo Domingo
Currency
(1865) 8 reales = 1 peso
(1880) 100 centavos = 1 peso
(1883) 100 centimos = 1 franc
(1885) 100 centavos = 1 peso

Main Article Postage stamps and postal history of the Dominican Republic

== Don Territory ==
Dates
1918 – 1920
Currency
100 kopecks = 1 Russian ruble

Refer
Russian Civil War Issues

== Donetsk People's Republic ==
Dates
May 2014 –
Currency
100 kopiykas = 1 Ukrainian hryvnia

Refer
Ukraine

== Dorpat (German Occupation) ==
Dates
1918 only
Currency
100 pfennige = 1 Reichsmark

Refer
German Occupation Issues (WWI)

== Dresden ==
Refer
South East Saxony (Russian Zone)

== Dronning Maud Land ==
Refer
Norwegian Dependency

== Dubai ==
Dates
1963 – 1972
Capital
Dubai
Currency
(1963) 100 naye paise = 1 rupee
(1966) 100 dirhams = 1 riyal

Main Article

See also
British Postal Agencies in Eastern Arabia;
Trucial States;
United Arab Emirates (UAE)

== Duitsch Oost Afrika Belgische Bezetting ==
Refer
German East Africa (Belgian Occupation)

== Dungarpur ==
Dates
1932 – 1948
Currency
12 pies = 1 anna; 16 annas = 1 rupee

Refer
Indian Native States

== Durazzo (Italian Post Office) ==
Dates
1902 – 1916
Currency
40 paras = 1 piastre

Refer
Italian Post Offices in the Turkish Empire

== Dutch East Indies ==
Dates
1864 - 1950

Main article
Postage stamps and postal history of the Dutch East Indies

== Duttia ==
Dates
1893 – 1899
Currency
12 pies = 1 anna; 16 annas = 1 rupee

Refer
Indian Native States

== Bibliography ==
- Stanley Gibbons Ltd, Europe and Colonies 1970, Stanley Gibbons Ltd, 1969
- Stanley Gibbons Ltd, various catalogues
- Stuart Rossiter & John Flower, The Stamp Atlas, W H Smith, 1989
- XLCR Stamp Finder and Collector's Dictionary, Thomas Cliffe Ltd, c.1960
