= Compendium of postage stamp issuers (Ia–In) =

Each "article" in this category is a collection of entries about several stamp issuers, presented in alphabetical order. The entries are formulated on the micro model and so provide summary information about all known issuers.

See the Category:Compendium of postage stamp issuers page for details of the project.

== Icaria ==
Refer
Ikaria

== ICC ==
Refer
Indochina (Indian Forces)

== Iceland ==
Dates
1873 –
Capital
Reykjavík
Currency
(1873) 96 skilling = 1 riksdaler
(1876) 100 aurer = 1 krona

== Idar ==
Dates
1939 – 1950
Currency
12 pies = 1 anna; 16 annas = 1 rupee

Refer
Indian Native States

== IEF ==
Refer
Indian Expeditionary Forces (IEF)

== Ifni ==
Dates
1941 – 1969
Capital
Sidi Ifni
Currency
100 centimos = 1 peseta

Refer
Spanish West Africa

== Ikaria ==
Dates
1912 – 1913
Capital
Agios Kirykos (Ayios Kirikos)
Currency
100 lepta = 1 drachma

Main Article Needed

See also
Greek Occupation Issues

== Ile Rouad ==
Dates
1916 – 1921
Capital
Currency
100 centimes = 1 piastre

Refer
Alaouites

== Ili Republic ==
Refer
Sinkiang

== Imperial Japanese Government ==
Refer
Brunei (Japanese Occupation)

== Inde ==
Refer
French Indian Settlements

== India ==
Dates
1852 –
Capital
Delhi
Currency
(1852) 12 pies = 1 anna; 16 annas = 1 rupee
(1957) 100 naye paise = 1 rupee
(1964) 100 paisa = 1 rupee

See also
East India

== Indian Convention States ==
Includes
Chamba;
Faridkot;
Gwalior;
Jind;
Nabha;
Patiala

== Indian Expeditionary Forces (IEF) ==
Dates
1914 – 1922
Currency
12 pies = 1 anna; 16 annas = 1 rupee

Refer
Indian Overseas Forces

== Indian Feudatory States ==
Refer
Indian Native States

== Indian Native States ==
Includes
Alwar;
Bamra;
Barwani;
Bhopal;
Bhor;
Bijawar;
Bundi;
Bussahir;
Charkari;
Cochin;
Dhar;
Dungarpur;
Duttia;
Hyderabad;
Idar;
Indore;
Jaipur;
Jammu & Kashmir;
Jasdan;
Jhalawar;
Kishangarh;
Las Bela;
Morvi;
Nandgaon;
Nawanager;
Orchha;
Poonch;
Rajasthan;
Rajpipla;
Scinde;
Shahpura;
Sirmoor;
Soruth (Saurashtra);
Travancore;
Travancore-Cochin;
Wadhwan

See also
Indian Convention States

== Indian Overseas Forces ==
Main Article Needed

Includes
China Expeditionary Force;
Congo (Indian UN Force);
Gaza (Indian UN Force);
Indian Expeditionary Forces (IEF);
Indochina (Indian Forces);
Korea (Indian Custodian Forces);
Mosul (Indian Forces)

== Indochina ==
Dates
1889 – 1949
Capital
Saigon
Currency
(1889) 100 centimes = 1 franc
(1918) 100 cents = 1 piastre
Main Article
Postage stamps and postal history of Indochina

== Indochina Territories ==
Main Article
Postage stamps and postal history of the Indochina Territories
Includes
Annam (Indochina);
Cambodia (Indochina)
See also
Annam & Tongking;
Cochin-China

== Indochina (Indian Forces) ==
Dates
1954 – 1968
Currency
(1954) 12 pies = 1 anna; 16 annas = 1 rupee
(1957) 100 naye paise = 1 rupee
(1964) 100 paisa = 1 rupee

Refer
Indian Overseas Forces

== Indochinese Post Offices Abroad ==
Refer
China (Indochinese Post Offices)

== Indonesia ==
Dates
1945 –
Capital
Djakarta
Currency
(1945) 100 cents = 1 gulden or 100 sen = 1 rupiah
(1950) 100 sen = 1 rupiah

Main Article
Postage stamps and postal history of Indonesia

See also
Riau-Lingga Archipelago

== Indore ==
Dates
1886 – 1950
Currency
12 pies = 1 anna; 16 annas = 1 rupee

Refer
Indian Native States

== Ingermanland ==
Refer
North Ingermanland

== Inhambane ==
Dates
1895 – 1920
Capital
Inhambane
Currency
(1895) 1000 reis = 1 milreis
(1912) 100 centavos = 1 escudo

Refer
Mozambique Territories

== Inini ==
Dates
1932 – 1946
Capital
Camopi
Currency
100 centimes = 1 franc

Refer
French Guiana

== Inner Mongolia ==
Refer
Mengkiang (Japanese Occupation)

== International Commission in Indochina (ICC) ==
Refer
Indochina (Indian Forces)

== International Court of Justice (The Hague) ==
Dates
1934 – 1958
Currency
100 cents = 1 gulden

Refer
International Organisations

== International Education Office ==
Dates
1944 – 1960
Currency
100 cents = 1 franc

Refer
International Organisations

== International Labour Office ==
Dates
1923 – 1960
Currency
100 cents = 1 franc

Refer
International Organisations

== International Organisations ==
Main Article Needed

Includes
Council of Europe (Strasbourg);
International Court of Justice (The Hague);
International Education Office;
International Labour Office;
International Refugees Organisation;
International Telecommunication Union;
League of Nations (Geneva);
UNESCO;
United Nations (UN);
Universal Postal Union (UPU);
World Health Organisation;
World Intellectual Property Organisation;
World Meteorological Organisation

== International Refugees Organisation ==
Dates
1950 only
Currency
100 cents = 1 franc

Refer
International Organisations

== International Telecommunication Union ==
Dates
1958 – 1960
Currency
100 cents = 1 franc

Refer
International Organisations

== Bibliography ==
- Stanley Gibbons Ltd, Europe and Colonies 1970, Stanley Gibbons Ltd, 1969
- Stanley Gibbons Ltd, various catalogues
- Stuart Rossiter & John Flower, The Stamp Atlas, W H Smith, 1989
- XLCR Stamp Finder and Collector's Dictionary, Thomas Cliffe Ltd, c.1960
