= Compendium of postage stamp issuers (O) =

Each "article" in this category is a collection of entries about several stamp issuers, presented in alphabetical order. The entries are formulated on the micro model and so provide summary information about all known issuers.

See the Category:Compendium of postage stamp issuers page for details of the project.

== Obock ==
Dates
1892 – 1894
Capital
Obock
Currency
100 centimes = 1 franc

Refer
Djibouti

== Occupation Francaise ==
Refer
Arad (French Occupation)

== Occupied Enemy Territories (TEO) ==
Refer
Syria (French Occupation)

== Oceanic Settlements ==
Refer
French Oceanic Settlements

== Oil Rivers Protectorate ==
Dates
1892 – 1893
Capital
Enugu
Currency
12 pence = 1 shilling; 20 shillings = 1 pound

Refer
Nigerian Territories

== Oldenburg ==
Dates
1852 – 1867
Currency
72 groat = 1 thaler

Refer
German States

== Olonetz ==
Refer
Aunus (Finnish Occupation)

== Olsztyn ==
Refer
Allenstein

== Oltre Giuba ==
Refer
Jubaland

== Oman ==
Dates
1971 –
Capital
Muscat
Currency
1000 baizas = 1 rial saidi

Main Article Needed

See also
Muscat;
Muscat & Oman

== OMF ==
Refer
Syria (French Occupation)

== ONF Castellorizo ==
Refer
Castelrosso (French Occupation)

== Orange Free State ==
Dates
1868 – 1900
Capital
Bloemfontein
Currency
12 pence = 1 shilling; 20 shillings = 1 pound

Refer
Orange River Colony

== Orange River Colony ==
Dates
1900 – 1907
Capital
Bloemfontein
Currency
12 pence = 1 shilling; 20 shillings = 1 pound

Main Article Needed

Includes
Orange Free State

== Orchha ==
Dates
1913 – 1939
Currency
12 pies = 1 anna; 16 annas = 1 rupee

Refer
Indian Native States

== Osterreich ==
Refer
Austria

== Ostland ==
Dates
1941 – 1945
Currency
100 pfennige = 1 mark

Refer
German Occupation Issues (WW2)

== Ottoman Empire ==
Refer
Turkey

== Oubangui-Chari ==
Dates
1922 – 1937
Capital
Bangui
Currency
100 centimes = 1 franc

Main Article Postage stamps and postal history of Ubangi-Shari

Includes
Oubangui-Chari-Tchad

See also
Central African Republic;
French Equatorial Africa

== Oubangui-Chari-Tchad ==
Dates
1915 – 1922
Capital
Bangui
Currency
100 centimes = 1 franc

Refer
Oubangui-Chari

== Bibliography ==
- Stanley Gibbons Ltd, Europe and Colonies 1970, Stanley Gibbons Ltd, 1969
- Stanley Gibbons Ltd, various catalogues
- Stuart Rossiter & John Flower, The Stamp Atlas, W H Smith, 1989
- XLCR Stamp Finder and Collector's Dictionary, Thomas Cliffe Ltd, c.1960
