= Compendium of postage stamp issuers (Ta–To) =

Each "article" in this category is a collection of entries about several stamp issuers, presented in alphabetical order. The entries are formulated on the micro model and so provide summary information about all known issuers.

See the Category:Compendium of postage stamp issuers page for details of the project.

== Tadzikistan ==
Refer
Tajikistan

== Tahiti ==
Dates
1882 – 1915
Capital
Papeete
Currency
100 centimes = 1 franc

Refer
French Oceanic Settlements

== Taiwan ==
Dates
1945 – 1949; 2007 –
Capital
Taipei
Currency
100 cents = 1 dollar

See also
Chinese Nationalist Republic (Taiwan);
Japanese Taiwan (Formosa)

== Tajikistan ==
Dates
1992 –
Capital
Dushanbe
Currency
(1992) 100 kopecks = 1 Russian rouble
(1995) 100 tanga = 1 Tajikistani rouble
(2000) 100 diram = 1 Tajikistani somoni

Main Article Postage stamps and postal history of Tajikistan

See also
Union of Soviet Socialist Republics (USSR)

== Tanganyika ==
Dates
1922 – 1964
Capital
Dar-es-Salaam
Currency
100 cents = 1 shilling

See also
German East Africa;
Kenya Uganda & Tanzania (Combined Issues)

== Tangier ==
Dates
1927 – 1957
Capital
Tangier
Currency
12 pence = 1 shilling; 20 shillings = 1 pound

Main Article Postage stamps and postal history of Tangier

== Tangier (British Post Offices) ==
Refer
Tangier

== Tangier (French Post Office) ==
Dates
1918 – 1942
Currency
100 centimes = 1 franc

Refer
French Post Offices Abroad

== Tangier (Spanish Post Offices) ==
Dates
1921 – 1957
Currency
100 centimos = 1 peseta

Refer
Spanish Post Offices Abroad

== Tannu Tuva ==
Refer
Tuva

== Tanzania ==
Dates
1965 –
Capital
Dar-es-Salaam
Currency
100 cents = 1 shilling

See also
German East Africa;
Kenya Uganda & Tanzania (Combined Issues);
Tanganyika;
Zanzibar

== Tasmania ==
Dates
1853 – 1912
Capital
Hobart
Currency
12 pence = 1 shilling; 20 shillings = 1 pound

Main Article Needed

Includes
Van Diemen's Land

See also
Australia

== Tchad ==
Refer
Chad

== Tchongking (Indochinese Post Office) ==
Dates
1903 – 1922
Currency
(1903) 100 centimes = 1 franc
(1919) 100 cents = 1 piastre

Refer
China (Indochinese Post Offices)

== Telos ==
Dates
1912 – 1932
Capital
Megalo Khorio
Currency
100 centesimi = 1 lira

Refer
Aegean Islands (Dodecanese)

== Temesvar (Romanian Occupation) ==
Dates
1919 only
Currency
100 filler = 1 korona

Refer
Romanian Post Abroad

== Temesvar (Serbian Occupation) ==
Dates
1919 only
Currency
100 filler = 1 korona

Refer
Serbian Occupation Issues

== TEO ==
Refer
Syria (French Occupation)

== Terre Adelie ==
Refer
French Southern & Antarctic Territories

== Tete ==
Dates
1913 – 1920
Capital
Tete
Currency
100 centavos = 1 escudo

Refer
Mozambique Territories

== Tetuan (Spanish PO) ==
Dates
1908 – 1909
Currency
100 centimos = 1 peseta

Refer
Spanish Post Offices Abroad

== Thai Occupation of Malaya ==
Refer
Malaya (Thai Occupation)

== Thailand ==
Dates
1883 –
Capital
Bangkok
Currency
100 satangs = 1 baht

Main Article Postage stamps and postal history of Thailand

Includes
Malaya (Thai Occupation);
Siam;
Siam (Thailand)

== Thailand (British Post Office) ==
Refer
Bangkok (British Post Office)

== Thessaly (Turkish Occupation) ==
Dates
1898 only
Currency
40 paras = 1 piastre

Refer
Turkey

== Thrace ==
Main Article Needed

Includes
Adrianople;
Dedêagatz (Greek Occupation);
Eastern Thrace;
Gumultsina;
Thrace (Allied Occupation);
Western Thrace;
Western Thrace (Greek Occupation)

See also
Greek Occupation Issues

== Thrace (Allied Occupation) ==
Dates
1919 – 1920
Currency
100 stotinki = 1 lev (Bulgarian)

Refer
Thrace

== Thuringia (Russian Zone) ==
Dates
1945 – 1946
Capital
Erfurt
Currency
100 pfennige

Refer
Germany (Allied Occupation)

== Thurn & Taxis ==
Dates
1852 – 1867
Currency
30 silbergroschen = 1 thaler (north)
60 kreuzer = 1 gulden (south)

Refer
German States

== Tibet ==
Dates
1912 – 1959
Capital
Lhasa
Currency
6.67 trangka = 1 sang

Main Article Postage stamps and postal history of Tibet

== Tibet (Chinese Post Offices) ==
Dates
1911 – 1912
Currency
12 pies = 1 anna; 16 annas = 1 rupee

Refer
Chinese Empire

== Tientsin (French Post Office) ==
Dates
1903 – 1922
Currency
100 centimes = 1 franc

Refer
French Post Offices Abroad

== Tientsin (Italian Post Office) ==
Dates
1917 – 1922
Currency
100 cents = 1 dollar

Refer
Italian Post Offices Abroad

== Tierra del Fuego ==
Dates
1891 only
Currency
centigrammes of gold dust (centavos)

Refer
Argentina

Chile

== Timișoara ==
Refer
Temesvar (Romanian Occupation)

== Timor ==
Dates
1885 – 1976
Capital
Dili
Currency
(1885) 1000 reis = 1 milreis
(1894) 100 avos = 1 pataca
(1960) 100 centavos = 1 escudo

Main Article
Postage stamps and postal history of Timor-Leste

== Tobago ==
Dates
1879 – 1896
Capital
Scarborough
Currency
12 pence = 1 shilling; 20 shillings = 1 pound

Refer
Trinidad & Tobago

== Togo ==
Dates
1957 –
Capital
Lomé
Currency
100 centimes = 1 franc

Main Article Needed

Includes
Togo (French Colony)

See also
German Togo;
Togo (Anglo-French Occupation)

== Togo (Anglo-French Occupation) ==
Dates
1914 – 1919
Currency
British, French & German all used concurrently

Main Article Needed

See also
German Colonies;
Togo

== Togo (British Occupation) ==
Refer
Togo (Anglo-French Occupation)

== Togo (French Colony) ==
Dates
1921 – 1957
Currency
100 centimes = 1 franc

Refer
Togo

== Bibliography ==
- Stanley Gibbons Ltd, Europe and Colonies 1970, Stanley Gibbons Ltd, 1969
- Stanley Gibbons Ltd, various catalogues
- Stuart Rossiter & John Flower, The Stamp Atlas, W H Smith, 1989
- XLCR Stamp Finder and Collector's Dictionary, Thomas Cliffe Ltd, c.1960
