= Postage stamps and postal history of the Gambia =

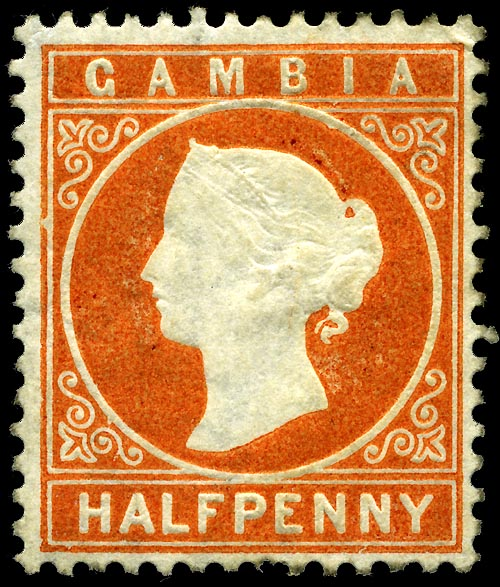
An 1880 stamp of the Gambia

This is a survey of the postage stamps and postal history of the Gambia.

The Gambia is a country in West Africa surrounded by Senegal except for a short coastline on the Atlantic Ocean in the west. The Gambia River, from which the country takes its name, flows through it. The capital city is Banjul.

== First stamps ==
The first stamps of Gambia were issued in March 1869. The early issues featured an embossed portrait of Queen Victoria.

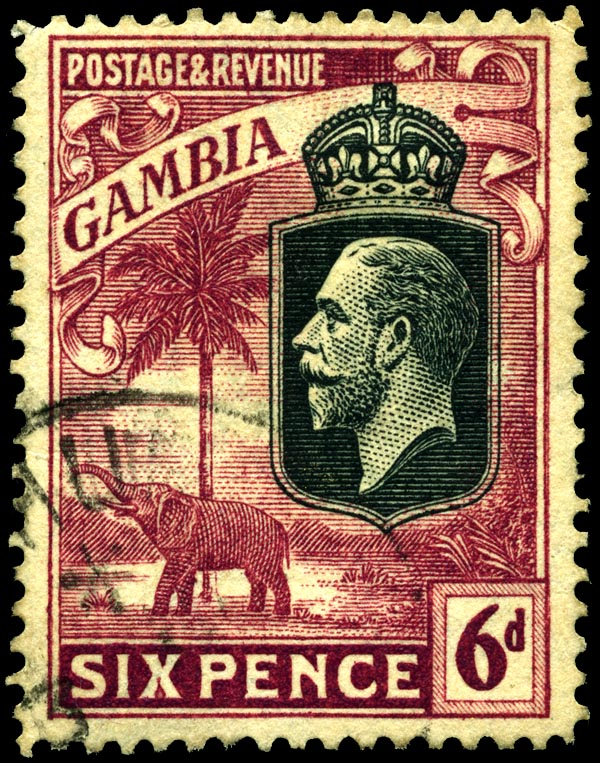
A 1922 stamp of the Gambia

== Independence ==
The Gambia achieved independence on 18 February 1965, as a constitutional monarchy within the Commonwealth. On 24 April 1970, The Gambia became a republic.

== Legendary Heroes of Africa ==
Legendary Heroes of Africa was a series of postage stamps simultaneously issued and released by the countries of Gambia, Liberia, and Sierra Leone in March 2011 to celebrate Jewish heroes of the South African Liberation struggle.

== See also ==
- West Africa Study Circle
