= Lwei =

- Location within Kenya
- Coordinates: 0.45°N 34.13°E
- Country: Kenya
- County: Busia County
- Time zone: UTC+3 (EAT)

Lwei is a small settlement in Kenya's Busia County.
