= Postage stamps and postal history of El Salvador =

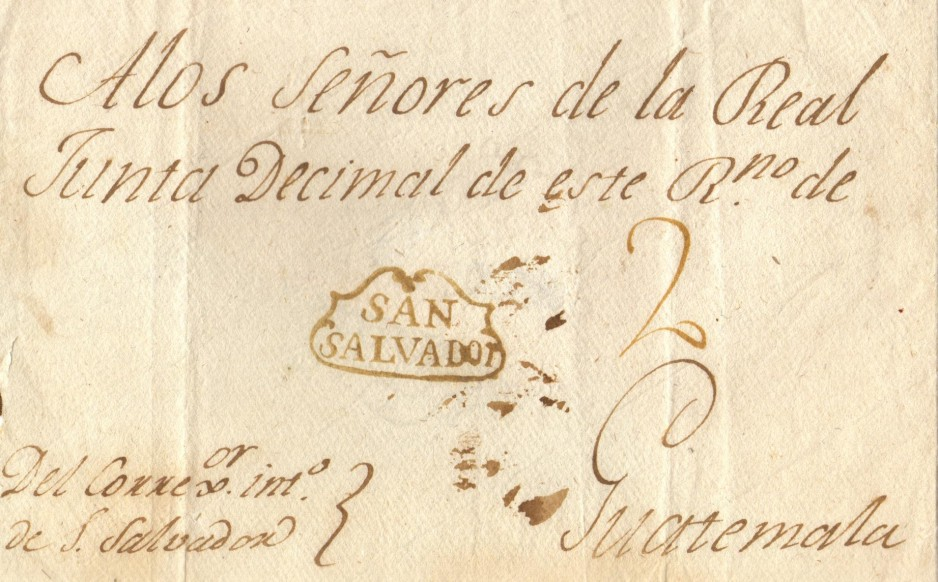
Stampless letter, black crown town cancel San Salvador addressed to Guatemala. Rated 2 reales.

El Salvador became independent from Spain in 1821. It has produced its own stamps since 1867.

The earliest known postal marking for El Salvador has been found on an entire letter from Santa Ana to Guatemala, July 30, 1780. It bears a pre-philatelic postmark from Santa Ana.

== Prestamp postal markings ==
=== Colonial period ===
Throughout the colonial era, El Salvador was part of the Captaincy General of Guatemala. Hence, its postal history during this period is directly related to that of the other provinces of the territory: Chiapas, Costa Rica, Guatemala, Honduras, and Nicaragua. After the Spanish conquest in the 1520s, the authorities started sending messengers to the ports in Mexico and Yucatán, from where all correspondence was sent to Spain. However, it was not until 1602, that the President of the Audiencia Real of Guatemala appointed Manuel de Esteves as 'Correo Mayor de Guatemala y sus Provincias' (Postmaster General of Guatemala & its Provinces).

Esteves died the following year, but it was not until 1612 that Baltasar Pinto de Amberes was appointed as the new Correo Mayor. Pedro Crespo Xuarez, who bought the title and office at a public auction, replaced him in 1620. After Crespo, only three individuals filled the office of Correo Mayor by purchasing it: Francisco de Lira y C·rcamo (1646–1682), Jose Agustin de Estrada (1682–1730), and Pedro Ortiz de Letona (1730–1767). In 1767, the Correo Mayor system was abolished and replaced by a government monopoly. On March 1, 1768, the new office of Administrador General de Correos y Maestre de Hostes, Postas, y Correosí was created, a position occupied by Captain General Pedro de Salazar Herrera Natera y Mendoza. Under the new regime, Simon de Larrazabal (1768–1797) assumed responsibility of the royal mail in Guatemala. He was succeeded by Miguel de Ateaga y Olazaga (1797–1823), who was the last Spanish postmaster of the Captaincy.

Early in the Colonial era, the route for shipment of goods and supplies, including mail, was established between Spain and Central America. The Correo Mayor set up periodic routes across the Captaincy territory, and appointed deputies in Comayagua, San Salvador, Ciudad Real, Chiapas, Honduras, Leon, Matagalpa, and Cartago. Mail from and going to Spain was initially received and sent via Veracruz, but in 1615, the route was changed. Correspondence was sent by ship to ports in Yucatán (either Río Lagartos or Sisal), going overland via Valladolid to Bacalar, a onetime Caribbean port, then by coastal vessel up the Gulf of Honduras, and finally overland to Guatemala City.

The first mail boat to Mexico and Central America departed from Spain on November 4, 1679, and arrived at Veracruz on March 28, 1680. By 1704, the route to Central America was changed again, so the mail would first arrive at Veracruz, and from there, it would be sent inland to Oaxaca, and then successively to Chiapas, Comitn, Huehuetenango, Totonicapán, and Guatemala City. From Guatemala, the route continued south to cities in El Salvador and Nacaome (Honduras), then north to Comayagua and Tegucigalpa (Honduras), and south to León (Nicaragua) and Cartago (Costa Rica).

By 1754 regularly scheduled horseback or mule couriers went from Guatemala City to León, picking up mail along the way. By 1766, the service extended as far south as El Realejo (Nicaragua) and Cartago. Likewise, from 1748, monthly courier trips to the north went as far as Oaxaca, which was the trans-shipment point for correspondence destined to or coming from Spain.

By August 1764 a monthly maritime service has been set up by Royal Decree, and ships regularly sailed between A Coruña (Spain) and Havana, Cuba. From Havana, sloops trans-shipped mail and parcels primarily to Veracruz, but also to Trujillo (Honduras); from there, mounted couriers took the mail to its final destination. Regarding mail sent through Veracruz, it was taken to Hacienda de Soto where the route to Oaxaca and Mexico City separated. There, mail for Central America was sorted out, and carried to Oaxaca. On February 22, 1768 the Spanish Crown issued a proclamation that required all mail to be stamped and initialed as evidence that the legal postage had been paid. While postal markings existed in a few places in Spanish America prior to this date, it is probable that the impetus to prepare the initial postmark devices for the entire Central American area came from this decree.

In an order of 1796 the Captain General of Guatemala outlined the existing routes and established new ones to the south from Guatemala City. Two trips went to Leon on a monthly basis, with intermediate stops in Santa Ana, San Salvador, San Vicente, and San Miguel, all in El Salvador. From Leon, there was a monthly trip further south, ending in Cartago. From San Miguel, two trips went to Trujillo (Honduras), and one trip was made to Tegucigalpa. Finally, from Santa Ana, trips were made to Ahuachapán and Sonsonate. Return trips were made on the same routes with the same frequency; and were scheduled to coincide with the deliveries of mail made from the outlying regions.

Starting in 1809 hemispheric packet boat service was organized to run from Iztapa (Guatemala) via Cartago and David, Panama, and terminating in Guayaquil (Ecuador). The first sailing on this course was said to have occurred on March 10, 1810. During 1811, a tri-monthly mail route was established between Guatemala, Mexico, the Windward Islands, and Spain.

=== Colonial postal rates ===
From 1620 to 1748 the postal rates in effect to be paid on receipt of a letter in Central America were 2 reales for a single letter, 4 reales for a double letter (i.e. a letter folded eight-ply, but not thicker than a finger), 8 reales for letters two to six fingers thick, and 2 to 3 pesos for a thicker letter. In 1749, the so-called efinger-system was abolished, and by 1763, postage was charged strictly by weight. The 1764 royal order established the following tariffs for letters from all of the Indies to Spain: 4 copper-silver reales for a single letter; 9 copper-silver reales for a double letter; 12 copper-silver reales for a threequarter Onza; and 16 copper-silver reales per Onza. In 1766, a 2 reales tariff was established for single letters sent from Guatemala to:

- Comayagua
- Tegucigalpa
- León
- Costa Rica.

On November 3, 1796, Miguel de Ateaga, then Postmaster of Guatemala, adopted a new general tariff for postal rates. The tariffs were raised in 1807 to cover the costs of establishing a second trip to Oaxaca. These raises were of ½ real for single letters, 1 real for double and triple letters, and ½ real for each additional Onza for letters destined to territories outside the Captaincy General. The next postal tariff, adopted on October 1, 1814 and promulgated in Guatemala City the following year by Postmaster Miguel de Ateaga, charged for a simple letter of less than one-half Onza, 3 reales within Central America, Yucatán, the north of Mexico, Tabasco, California, the Caribbean Islands, and New Orleans; 2 reales for various cities in the center of Mexico; and 4 reales for Peru, the remainder of South America, the Philippines, and Spain.

=== El Salvador during the colonial period ===
During the 53 years between the commencement of the Colonial government's mail service (1768) and independence from Spain (1821), a number of different Salvadorian 'estafetas' or post offices operated, from time to time. These offices included Ahuachapán, Ateos, Cojutepeque, Chalatenango, Gotera, Metapán, Mexicanos, San Salvador, San Miguel, San Vicente, Santa Ana, Sonsonate, Suchitoto, Usulután and Zacatecoluca. Additionally, postal markings are known from Olocuilta and Sensuntepeque. Most of the letters or wrappers from this era were used for government purposes, primarily concerning indigo, coffee, tobacco, or other judicial matters.

=== Central American Federation ===
During the Federal Republic of Central America with Mexico (1821–1823), no important changes were made to the postal system inherited from Spain. When the Central American Federation was proclaimed, Miguel de Ateaga, Spanish postmaster since 1796, was replaced by Antonio Batres y Naxera. The Federation issued its initial postal legislation on August 7, 1823, and the first definitive postal decree on April 24, 1824. This decree stated the following postal rates for a simple letter of less than one-half Onza: 2 (Central American Republic) reales for any destination in Central America, South America, or the Caribbean; and 4 reales for any destination in Spain, the Philippines, the United States, and any other foreign country. The legislation also granted free postal franking for all federation officials, but these wide exemptions from payment were voted out by the Federal Congress in 1826. The Federation continued the route to Oaxaca, having two trips per month from Guatemala City, and added a third trip south to Leon. According to a post office listing of the Central American Federation, El Salvador had the following 'estafetas' in 1830: Ahuachapán, Cojutepeque, Metapán, San Miguel, San Salvador, San Vicente, Santa Ana, Sonsonate, Suchitoto, and Zacatecoluca.

=== Independent El Salvador ===
Upon separating from the Federation, each state assumed the full responsibilities of handling its own mail system. However, the regulations of the Federation remained in use in each country until superseded by local legislation. For El Salvador, no information is available until 1849, when Mr. Jose Andrino was appointed as postmaster. On July 13 of that same year, El Salvador established weekly routes to Guatemala, Honduras, and Nicaragua. The first postal law was decreed on October 26, 1851, and three years later, on September 1, 1854, the first route itinerary for the interior of the country was published. By 1857, all the country was again covered by the postal service.

In 1852, a Postal Treaty was signed between Honduras, Nicaragua, and El Salvador. One practical effect of the treaty was that in the free port on Tigre Island, near Amapala (Honduras), a postal employee exchanged mail between the three countries. Guatemala and El Salvador signed a further treaty in 1865 with Bolivia, Colombia, Ecuador, Peru, and Venezuela, providing for reciprocal exchange of mail and parcels, free postage on official and diplomatic mail, and other procedural matters. It is believed that El Salvador, as the other Central American countries, retained the 2 real rate for domestic and inter-Central American postage for letters of less than one-half ounce until the issuance of its adhesive stamps. Mail to and from any Central American destination could be marked prepaid or collect, at the option of the sender.

In 1853, El Salvador signed a contract with the Central American Steam Navigation Company (CASNC) to permit mail steamers to call at Acajutla, La Libertad, and La Union. This company ran a line of steamers once a month between Iztapa (Guatemala) and Panama, touching in turn at Acajutla, La Libertad, La Union, Amapala (Honduras), El Realejo and San Juan del Sur (Nicaragua) for the conveyance of mail, passengers, and freight. Each government paid a subsidy for the carriage of the mail. Service began in 1854 and later was continued by the Panama Canal Railway Company steamers, and subsequently, by the steamers of the Pacific Mail Steamship Company. It can be assumed that because of these circumstances, post offices were opened in the three ports where the CASNC called (Acajutla, La Libertad, and La Union).

== First stamps ==
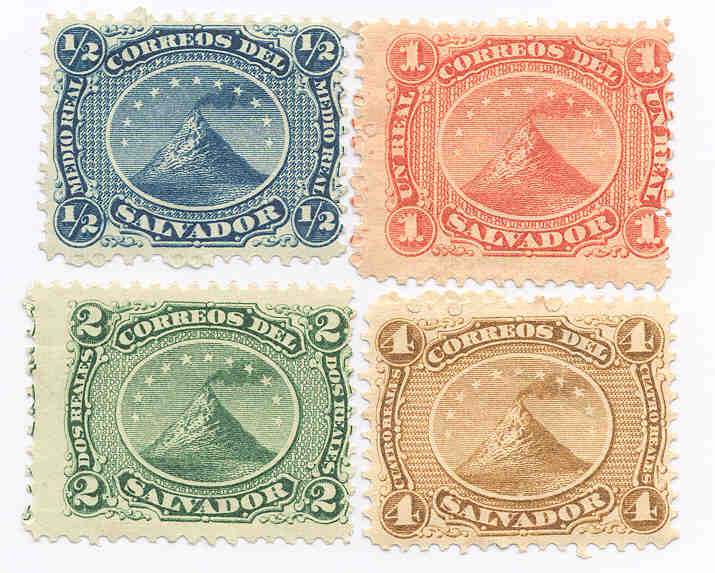
Izalco volcano: first Salvadoran postage stamps

The first stamps of El Salvador were issued in 1867, printed by the American Bank Note Company. For several decades, the designs of El Salvador stamps had a clear North American influence as the majority of issues were supplied by American Bank Note Company and the Hamilton Bank Note Company among others. From the 1950s onwards, the country started to commission stamps in Europe and also to produce them locally. In recent years, the printing has been mostly done by the Dirección General de Servicios Gráficos (the government printing house in San Salvador) and the subjects depict a combination of events of worldwide importance with local personalities or commemorations.

The first stamps of El Salvador were made by the American Bank Note Co. of New York or, as printed on the bottom of the sheets, Compañía Americana de Billetes de Banco de Nueva York. Printed in September 1866, they arrived in El Salvador on December 17. They were officially issued on January 17, 1867, but their use was not mandatory until March 1.

The set consists of four values: ½ Real (blue), 1 Real (red), 2 Reales (green) and 4 Reales (bistre), issued in sheets of 100. They feature an active volcano with 11 stars making a semi-circle above the volcano; each star represents Salvadoran provinces in those years: San Salvador, La Libertad, Sonsonate, Santa Ana, La Paz, Cuscatlán, Usulután, San Vicente, San Miguel, La Union, and Chalatenango.

There are two printings of this issue, the one in September 1866 already mentioned, and another in April 1873. The printings can be distinguished by the different color shades for each printing, and by the heavy yellow gum used on the first printing, which differs from the thin white gum used for the latter.

Traditionally, the volcano on the central oval has been considered to be the San Miguel volcano. However, since the design is an allegorical representation of the coat of arms existing at the time, the stamps really depict not the San Miguel, but the Izalco volcano (popularly known as El Faro del Pacífico - The Lighthouse of the Pacific). This argument is based on the fact that the decree signed by Francisco Dueñas, creating the coat of arms, specifically mentions the Izalco volcano as the inspiration for its design, and also on the idea that the Izalco volcano was (and still is) one of the symbols of the country. Covers genuinely used with these stamps are rare. So far, only 37 have been recorded.

=== Printing details ===
This issue was printed from plates engraved in line engraving or taille-douce in sheets of 100 each, in ten rows of ten. The imprint of the manufacturers is shown three times on each of the four margins. In the center of each margin is "American Bank Note Co., New York", while in the center of the space on each side of this is "COMPAÑIA AMERICANA DE BILLETES DE BANCO NUEVA YORK." The imprints in Spanish are all in capital letters and those in English are in ordinary type. Each imprint extends for a space equal to the width of two stamps so that only the 1st, 4th, 7th, and 10th stamps of the outside rows on each sheet have no lettering adjoining. The plates all seem to have been "laid" down in the same manner the top rows, or at any rate the top stamp of each vertical row, being applied first. In all four cases a guide dot was engraved below the design on the transfer roll. Thus as each impression was applied to the plate it marked a dot below which served as a guide for the correct placing of the stamp in the succeeding horizontal row. When the last row was applied the dots appeared on the margin and these were not removed. On the roller dies for the 1/2rl. and 1rl. this dot was placed 3.75 mm away from the center of the lower frame line of the design. Its position was such that the succeeding impressions failed to hide it and it always shows in the left side of the second O of CORREOS. In the 1/2rl. the dot is very conspicuous but in the 1rl. it is very small. In the 2rls. and 4rls. denominations the guide dot was 4.5 mm away from the lower part of the design so that it is not often visible on the stamps.

== 1874 Contrasello issue ==
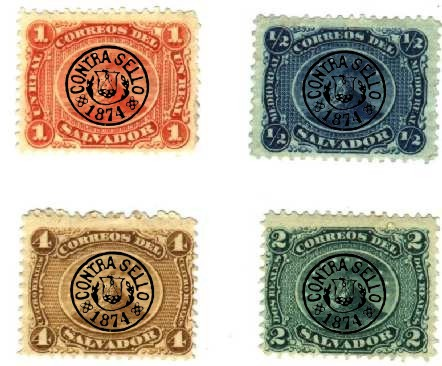
1874 Contrasello series

Seven years after the first volcano issue, the Government of El Salvador decided to discontinue its use, and handstamp its stock with a black control mark that had the national coat of arms in the center, surrounded by the legend 'Contrasello - 1874' and a circle. The reasons for the use of this handstamp remain unknown. Nevertheless, over the years two explanations have been developed:

- The issue was counterstamped because a significant quantity of stamps was stolen from the San Salvador post office. Suggested by Jean-Baptiste Moens in the October 1874 issue of 'Le Timbre-Poste', this theory was soon copied by other philatelic magazines of the period and it is the most known explanation now.
- The handstamp was a measure taken by the government to prevent the circulation of counterfeit stamps, which could have been the second counterfeit type of the 1867 issue. This hypothesis was also reported, but at the same time discredited, by Moens, having been later supported by an article written by Samuel Dawson, who was in El Salvador at the time.

The lack of official records from the time prevents us from knowing for sure which theory is correct. In any case, the reason for using this handstamp had to be significant enough to set aside most of the second printing of the 1867 issues (which must have arrived to El Salvador during the summer of 1873) and overprint it for further use.

== Avis de réception stamps ==
In 1897, El Salvador was one of the few countries to issue stamps for the Avis de réception service.

== See also ==
- El Salvador
