= Postage stamps and postal history of Georgia =

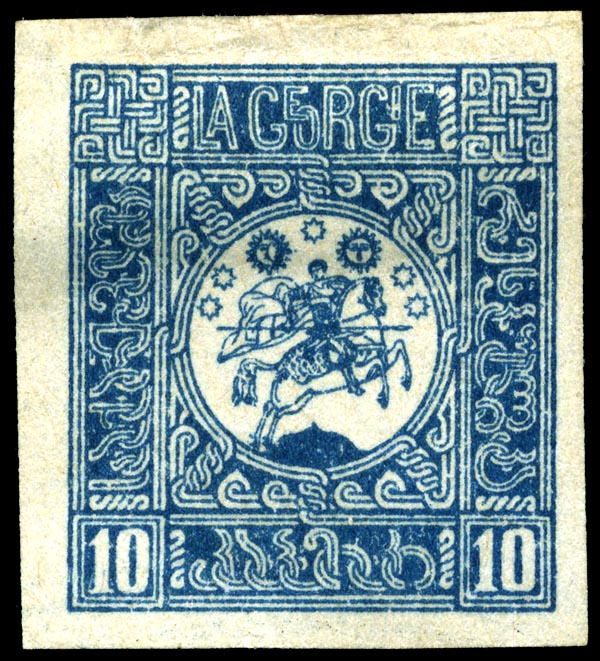
A 1919 stamp from Georgia

This is a survey of the postage stamps and postal history of Georgia.

Georgia is in the Caucasus region of Eurasia. Situated at the juncture of Eastern Europe and Western Asia, it is bounded to the west by the Black Sea, to the north by Russia, to the south by Turkey and Armenia, and to the east by Azerbaijan. Georgia covers a territory of 69,700 km^{2} (26,900 sq mi) and its population is 4.385 million.

At the beginning of the 19th century, Georgia was annexed by the Russian Empire. After a brief period of independence following the Russian Revolution of 1917, Georgia was invaded by Bolshevik armies in 1921 and incorporated into the Soviet Union in 1922. The independence of Georgia was restored in 1991.

== First stamps ==
The first stamps of Georgia as the Democratic Republic of Georgia were issued on 26 May 1919. A further series was issued in 1921.

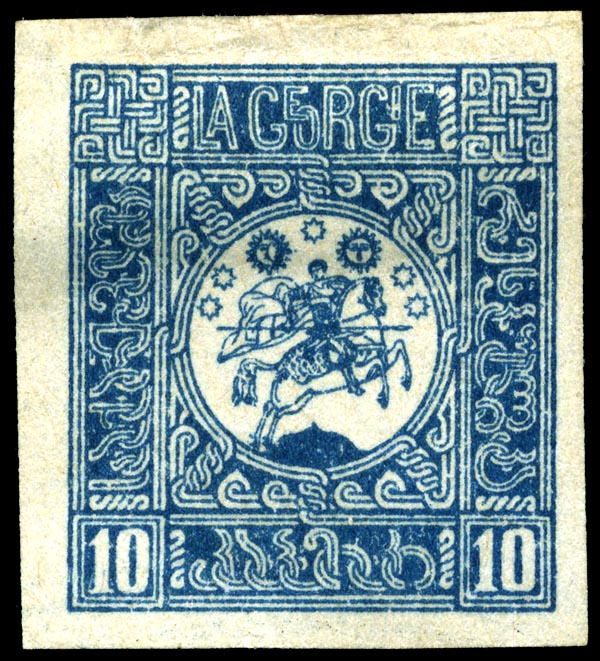
1919 St. George Series

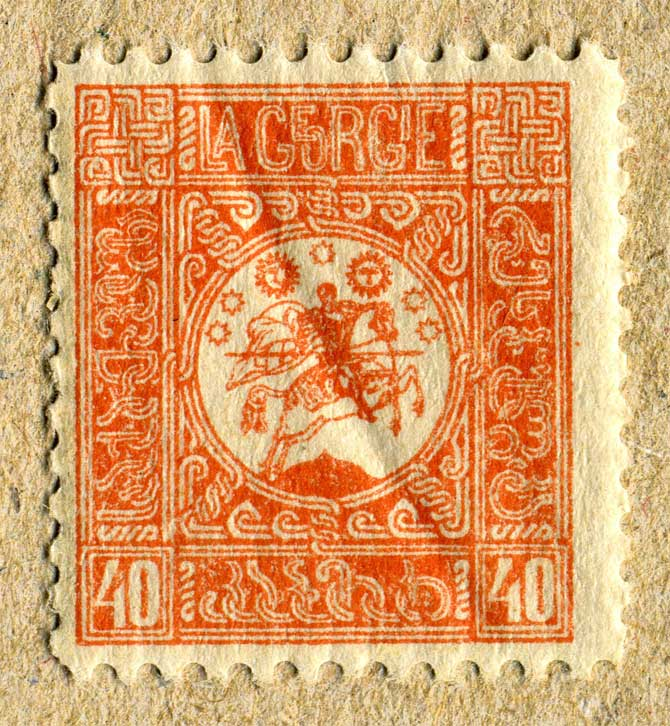
1919 St. George Series

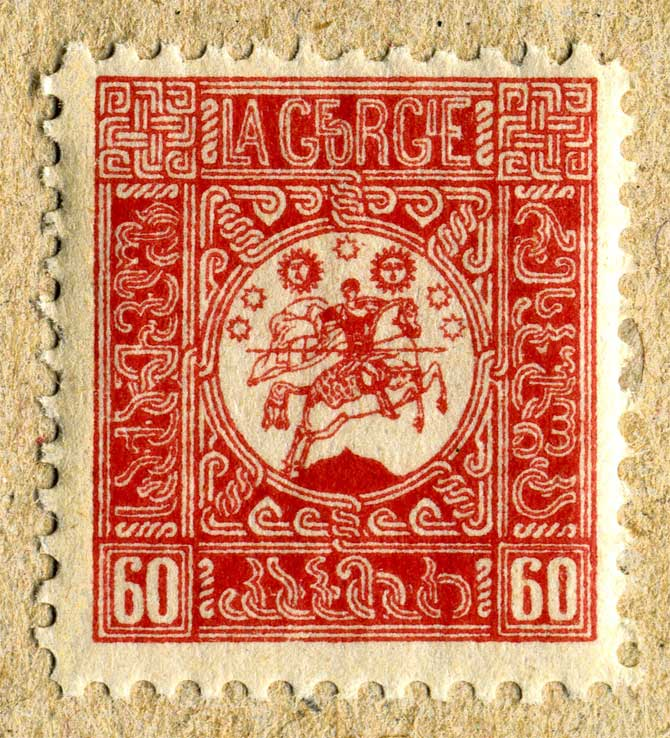
1919 St. George Series

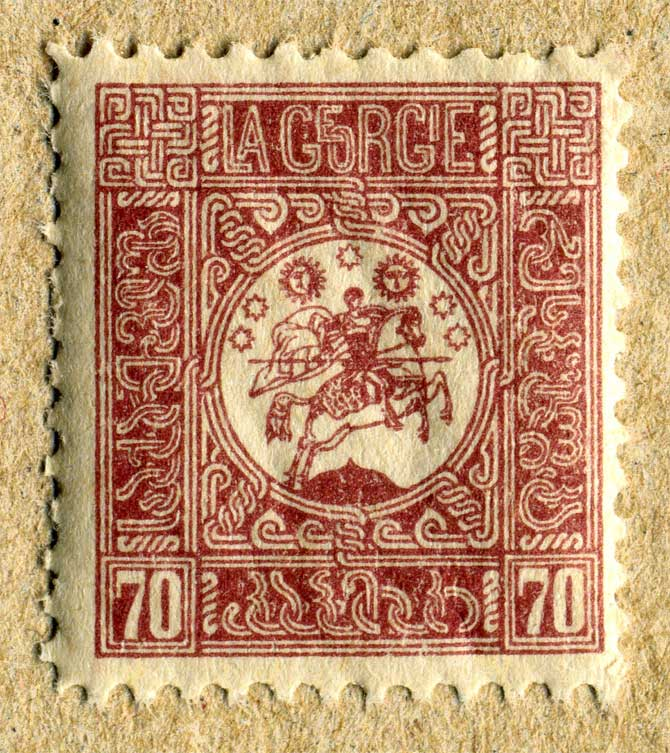
1919 St. George Series

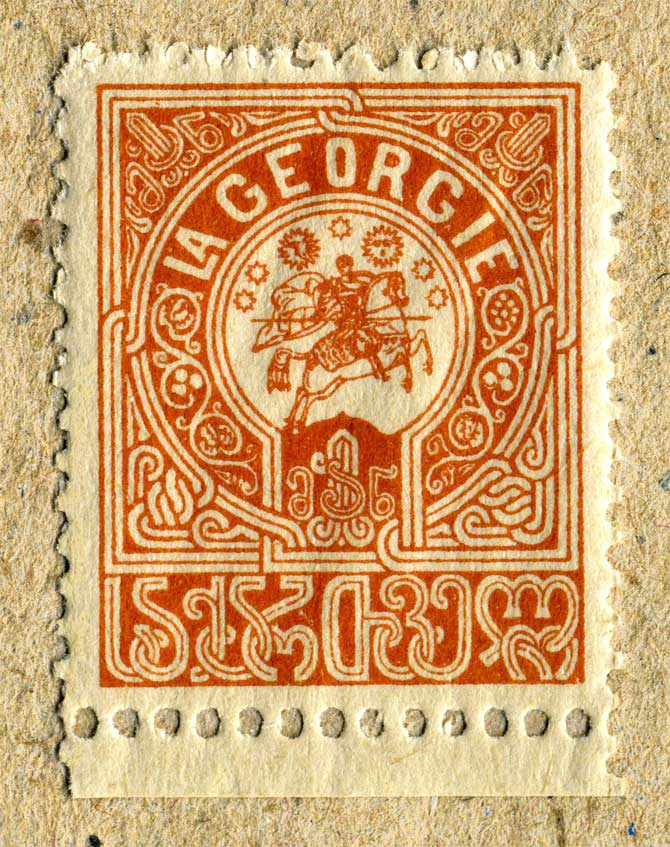
1919 St. George Series
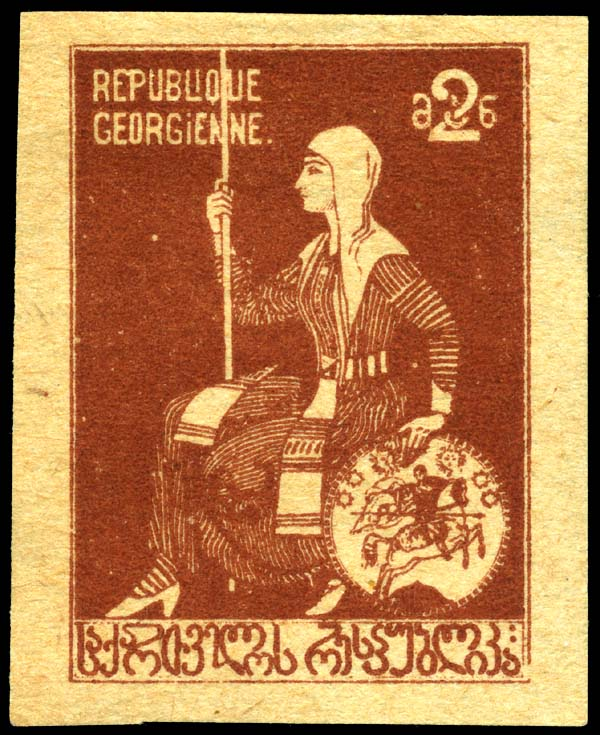
1920 Queen Thamar series

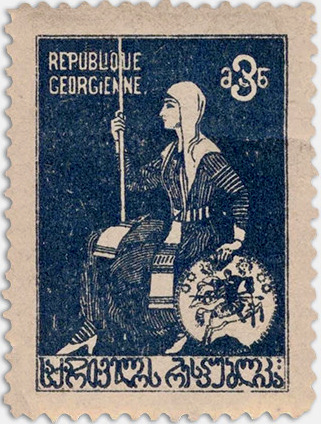
1920 Queen Thamar series

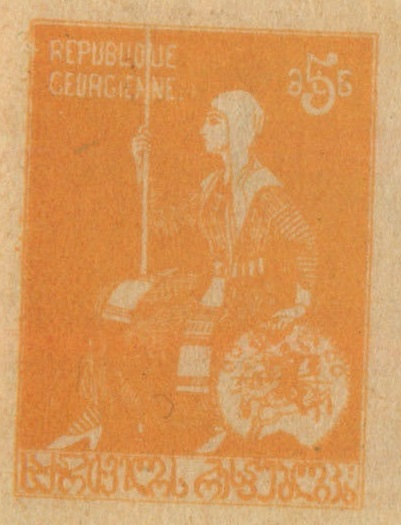
1920 Queen Thamar series

== Georgian Soviet Socialist Republic ==
In January and February 1922 a series of five stamps were issued for Georgia's membership as a Soviet Republic.

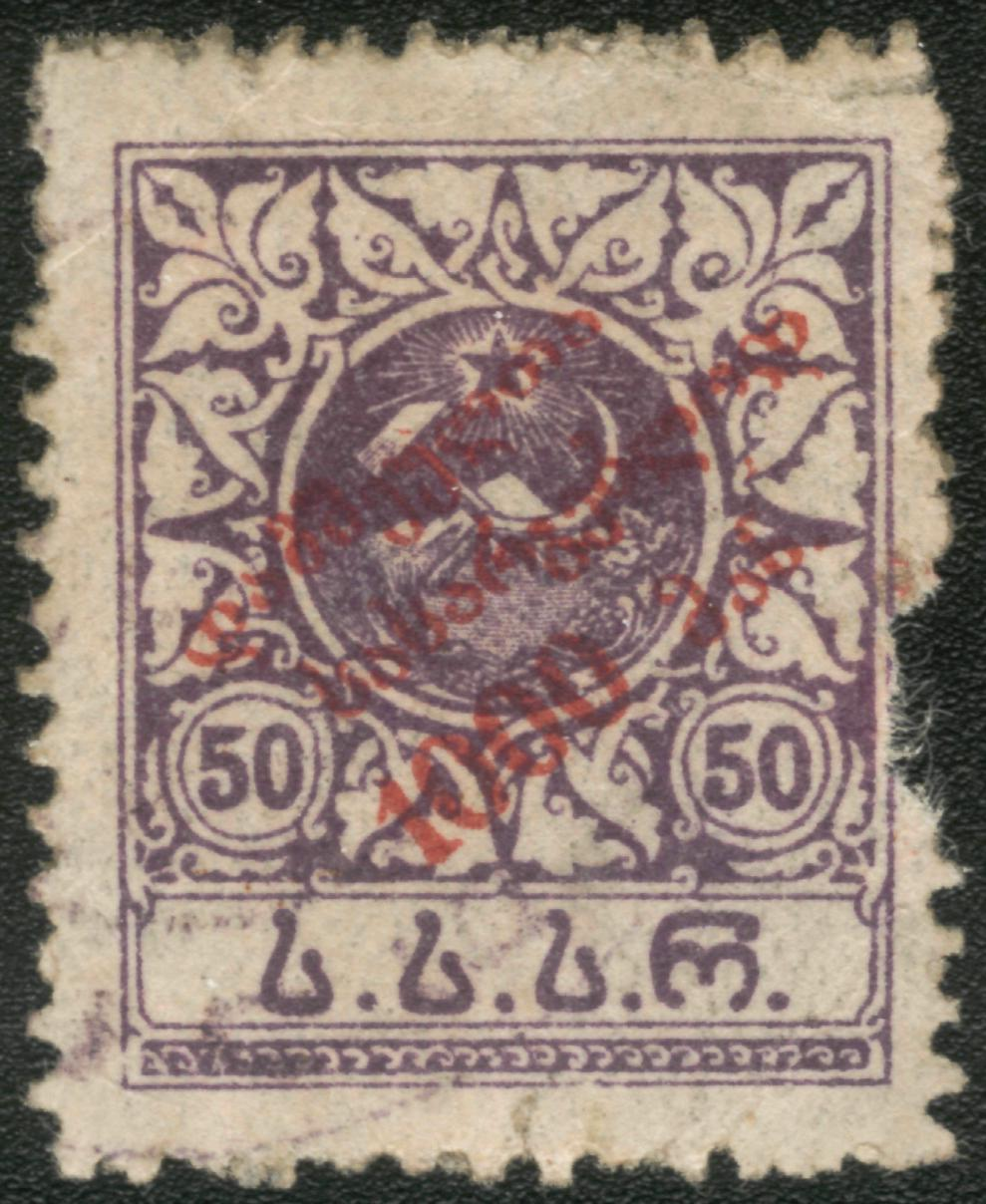
A 1922 stamp

== Transcaucasian Socialist Federative Soviet Republic ==
In March 1922 until September 1923 overprinted stamps of The Transcaucasian Socialist Federative Soviet Republic were used. From 1 October 1923 general issues of the Transcaucasian Federation were used.

== Soviet stamps ==
From 1924 until 1993 stamps of the Soviet Union were used in Georgia following the absorption of the Transcaucasian Socialist Federative Soviet Republic into the U.S.S.R.

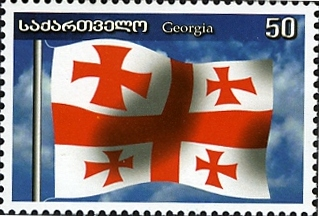
Modern stamps of Georgia from 2005

== Independence ==
Following the fall of the Soviet Union, Georgia became independent again in April 1991 and issued stamps in its own name from 31 July 1993. Unlike other ex-Soviet republics, Georgia did not overprint Soviet stamps to meet their postal needs after independence, although a number of overprints were carried out on Georgian stamps in 1994.

== Abkhazia ==
Stamps have been produced purporting to be from the Republic of Abkhazia, an area in western Georgia that is not recognised as a sovereign state by all but few countries. Most stamps of Abkhazia are believed to be bogus, produced in foreign countries solely for sale to collectors, but more recently Abkhazia has produced stamps that may have legitimate use locally within the borders of the disputed area. They are not recognised by the UPU.

== See also ==
- Postage stamps of Batum under British occupation
