= Compendium of postage stamp issuers (Ma–Md) =

Each "article" in this category is a collection of entries about several stamp issuers, presented in alphabetical order. The entries are formulated on the micro model and so provide summary information about all known issuers.

See the Category:Compendium of postage stamp issuers page for details of the project.

== Macao ==
Refer
Macau

== Macau ==
Dates
1884 –
Capital
Macau
Currency
(1884) 1000 reis = 1 milreis
(1894) 78 avos = 1 rupee
(1913) 100 avos = 1 pataca

== Macedonia ==
Dates
1991 –
Capital
Skopje
Currency
(1991) 100 paras = 1 dinar
(1992) 100 deni (de.) = 1 dinar (d.)

Main Article Needed

See also
Yugoslavia

== Macedonia (German Occupation) ==
Dates
1944 only
Currency
100 stotinki = 1 lev

Refer
German Occupation Issues (WW2)

See also
Kavalla (Greek Occupation);
Greek Occupation Issues

== Madagascar & Dependencies ==
Dates
1896 – 1958
Capital
Tananarive
Currency
100 centimes = 1 franc

Main Article Needed

Includes
Anjouan;
Diego–Suarez;
Great Comoro;
Mayotte;
Moheli;
Nossi–Be;
Ste Marie de Madagascar

See also
Malagasy Republic

== Madagascar (British posts) ==
Dates
1884 – 1895
Currency
12 pence = 1 shilling; 20 shillings = 1 pound

Refer
Postage stamps and postal history of Madagascar

== Madagascar (French Post Offices) ==
Dates
1885 – 1896
Currency
100 centimes = 1 franc

Refer
French Post Offices Abroad

See also
French Colonies;
Madagascar & Dependencies

== Madeira ==
Dates
1868 –
Capital
Funchal
Currency
(1868) 1000 reis = 1 milreis
(1929) 100 centavos = 1 escudo

Main Article Needed

See also
Africa (Portuguese Colonies);
Funchal

== Mafeking ==
Dates
1900 only
Currency
12 pence = 1 shilling; 20 shillings = 1 pound

Refer
Cape of Good Hope

== Mafia Island (British Occupation) ==
Dates
1915 – 1916
Currency
(GEA) 64 pesa = 100 heller = 1 rupee;
(BEA) 100 cents = 1 rupee
(both currencies in use simultaneously)

Refer
British Occupation Issues

== Magyarország ==
Refer
Hungary

== Mahe ==
Refer
French Indian Settlements

== Mahra Sultanate of Qishn & Socotra ==
Dates
1967 only
Capital
Qishn
Currency
1000 fils = 1 dinar

Refer
Aden Protectorate States

== Majunga (French Post Office) ==
Dates
1895 only
Currency
100 centimes = 1 franc

Refer
French Post Offices Abroad

== Malacca ==
Dates
1948 –
Capital
Melaka
Currency
100 cents = 1 dollar

Main Article Needed

See also
Malaysia

== Malagasy Republic ==
Dates
1958 –
Capital
Tananarive
Currency
(1958) 100 centimes = 1 franc
(1976) 5 francs = 1 ariary

Main Article Needed

See also
Madagascar & Dependencies

== Malawi ==
Dates
1964 –
Capital
Zomba
Currency
(1964) 12 pence = 1 shilling; 20 shillings = 1 pound
(1970) 100 tambalas = 1 kwacha

Main Article Needed

See also
British Central Africa;
Nyasaland Protectorate

== Malaya ==
Refer
Federated Malay States;
Malayan Federation;
Malayan Postal Union;
Malaysia

== Malaya (British Military Administration) ==
Dates
1945 – 1948
Currency
100 cents = 1 dollar

Refer
BA/BMA Issues

== Malaya (Japanese Occupation) ==
Dates
1942 – 1945
Currency
100 cents = 1 dollar

Refer
Japanese Occupation Issues

== Malaya (Thai Occupation) ==
Dates
1943 – 1945
Currency
100 cents = 1 dollar

Refer
Thailand

== Malayan Federation ==
Dates
1957 – 1963
Capital
Kuala Lumpur
Currency
100 cents = 1 dollar

Refer
Malaysia

== Malayan Postal Union ==
Dates
1936 – 1968
Currency
100 cents = 1 dollar

Refer
Malaysia

== Malaysia ==
Dates
1963 –
Capital
Kuala Lumpur
Currency
100 cents = 1 dollar

Includes
Malayan Federation;
Malayan Postal Union

See also
Federated Malay States;
Johore;
Kedah;
Kelantan;
Malacca;
Negri Sembilan;
Pahang;
Penang;
Perak;
Perlis;
Sabah;
Sarawak;
Selangor;
Sungei Ujong;
Trengganu

== Maldive Islands ==
Dates
1906 –
Capital
Malé
Currency
(1906) 100 cents = 1 rupee
(1951) 100 laaris = 1 rupee

Main Article Needed

== Mali Federation ==
Dates
1959 – 1960
Capital
Bamako
Currency
100 centimes = 1 franc

Main Article Needed

See also
French West Africa;
Mali Republic;
Senegal

== Mali Republic ==
Dates
1960 –
Capital
Bamako
Currency
100 centimes = 1 franc

Main Article Needed

See also
French West Africa;
Mali Federation

== Malta ==
Dates
1860 –
Capital
Valletta
Currency
(1860) 12 pence = 1 shilling; 20 shillings = 1 pound
(1972) 10 mils = 1 cent; 100 cents = 1 pound
(2008) 100 cents = 1 euro

Main Article
Postage stamps and postal history of Malta

== Malmedy ==
Refer
Eupen & Malmedy (Belgian Occupation)

== Man ==
Refer
Isle of Man

== Manama ==
Refer
Ajman

== Manchukuo ==
Dates
1932 – 1945
Capital
Harbin
Currency
100 fen = 1 yuan

Main Article Needed

== Manchuria ==
Refer
Chinese Provinces;
CPR Regional Issues;
Manchukuo

== Mariana Islands (Marianen) ==
Dates
1899 – 1914
Capital
Saipan
Currency
100 pfennige = 1 mark

Refer
German Colonies

See also
Spanish Marianas

== Marianas Espanolas ==
Refer
Spanish Marianas

== Marianen ==
Refer
Mariana Islands

== Marienwerder ==
Dates
1920 only
Currency
100 pfennige = 1 mark

Refer
Plebiscite Issues

== Maroc ==
Refer
French Morocco

== Marruecos ==
Refer
Spanish Morocco

== Marschall–Inseln ==
Refer
Marshall Islands (German Colony)

== Marshall Inseln ==
Refer
Marshall Islands (German Colony)

== Marshall Islands ==
Dates
1984 –
Capital
Majuro
Currency
100 cents = 1 dollar

Main Article Needed

== Marshall Islands (German Colony) ==
Dates
1897 – 1916
Capital
Majuro
Currency
100 pfennige = 1 Reichsmark

Refer
German Colonies

== Martinique ==
Dates
1886 – 1947
Capital
Fort-de-France
Currency
100 centimes = 1 franc

Main Article Needed

== Mauritania ==
Dates
1960 –
Capital
Nouakchott
Currency
(1960) 100 centimes = 1 franc
(1973) 100 cents = 1 ouguiya (um)

Main Article Needed

Includes
Mauritania (French Colony)

See also
French West Africa

== Mauritania (French Colony) ==
Dates
1906 – 1944
Capital
Port Etienne
Currency
100 centimes = 1 franc

Refer
Mauritania

== Mauritius ==
Dates
1847 –
Capital
Port Louis
Currency
(1847) 12 pence = 1 shilling; 20 shillings = 1 pound
(1878) 100 cents = 1 rupee

Main Article Needed

== Mayotte ==
Dates
1892 – 1914
Capital
Dzaoudzi
Currency
100 centimes = 1 franc (French)

Refer
Madagascar & Dependencies

Main article
Postage stamps and postal history of Mayotte

== Bibliography ==
- Stanley Gibbons Ltd, Europe and Colonies 1970, Stanley Gibbons Ltd, 1969
- Stanley Gibbons Ltd, various catalogues
- Stuart Rossiter & John Flower, The Stamp Atlas, W H Smith, 1989
- XLCR Stamp Finder and Collector's Dictionary, Thomas Cliffe Ltd, c.1960
