= Compendium of postage stamp issuers (E) =

Each "article" in this category is a collection of entries about several stamp issuers, presented in alphabetical order. The entries are formulated on the micro model and so provide summary information about all known issuers.

See the Category:Compendium of postage stamp issuers page for details of the project.

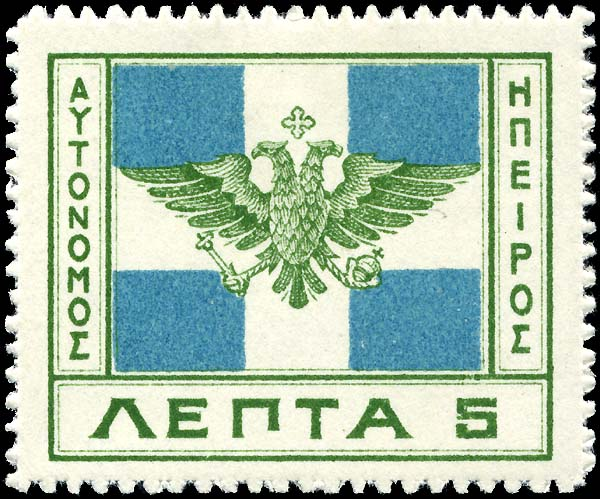
Flag stamp of Epirus, 5 lepta

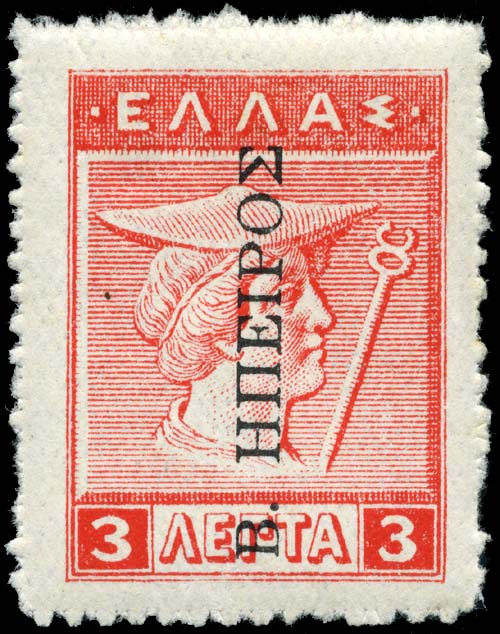
Epirus – Occupation overprint on 3-lepta stamp of Greece

== EAF ==
Refer
East Africa Forces

== East Africa ==
Refer
British East Africa

== East Africa & Uganda Protectorates ==
Dates
1903–1922
Capital
Nairobi
Currency
(1903) 12 pies = 1 anna; 16 annas = 1 rupee
(1907) 100 cents = 1 rupee

Refer
British East Africa

== East Africa Forces ==
Dates
1943–1948
Currency
12 pence = 1 shilling; 20 shillings = 1 pound

Refer
British Occupation Issues

== East China (People's Post) ==
Dates
1949–1950
Currency
100 cents = 1 dollar

Refer
CPR Regional Issues

== East Germany (DDR) ==
Dates
1949–1990
Capital
East Berlin
Currency
100 pfennige = 1 Ostmark

Main Article

See also
Germany

== East India ==
Dates
1855–1882
Currency
12 pies = 1 anna; 16 annas = 1 rupee

Main Article

See also
India

== East India Company ==
Refer
East India

== East Silesia ==
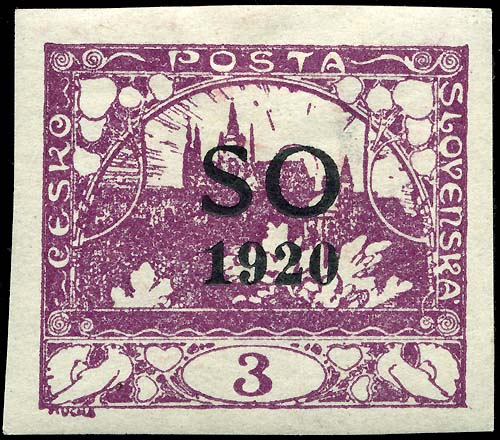
East Silesia – overprint on imperforate Hradcany 3–haleru stamp of Czechoslovakia

Dates
1920 only
Currency
Czech and Polish concurrently

Refer
Plebiscite Issues

== Eastern Arabia ==
Refer
British Postal Agencies in Eastern Arabia

== Eastern Command Area ==
Dates
1916–1918
Currency
100 pfennige = 1 Reichsmark

Refer
German Occupation Issues (WWI)

== Eastern Karelia (Finnish Occupation) ==
Dates
1941–1944
Currency
100 penni = 1 markka

Refer
Finnish Occupation Issues

== Eastern Rumelia ==
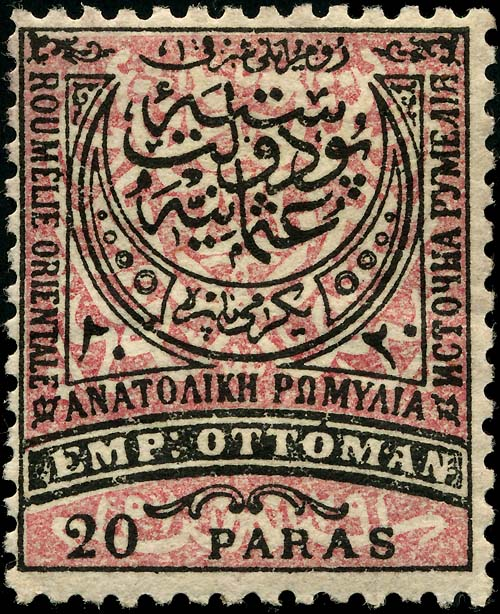
Eastern Rumelia – the stamps of the 1881 and 1884 designs list the name of the province in four languages – Turkish, French, Greek, and Bulgarian – using four alphabets – Arabic, Latin, Greek, and Cyrillic

Dates
1880–1885
Capital
Plovdiv (Philippopolis)
Currency
40 paras = 1 piastre

Refer
Bulgarian Territories

== Eastern Siberia ==
Refer
USSR Issues for the Far East

== Eastern Thrace ==
Dates
1920–1922
Currency
100 lepta = 1 drachma

Refer
Thrace

See also
Adrianople;
Greek Occupation Issues;
Western Thrace

== Ecuador ==
Dates
1865 –
Capital
Quito
Currency
(1865) 8 reales = 1 peso
(1881) 100 centavos = 1 sucre

Main Article
Postage stamps and postal history of Ecuador

See also
Galapagos Islands

== Edirne ==
Refer
Adrianople

== EEF ==
Refer
Palestine (Egyptian Occupation)

== Eesti ==
Refer
Estonia

== Egeo ==
Refer
Aegean Islands (Dodecanese)

== Egypt ==
Dates
1866 –
Capital
Cairo
Currency
(1866) 40 paras = 1 piastre
(1888) 1000 milliemes = 100 piastres = 1 pound

Main Article
Postage stamps and postal history of Egypt

Includes
Egyptian Post Offices in the Turkish Empire;
United Arab Republic (UAR)

== Egypt (British Forces) ==
Dates
1932–1943
Currency
100 piastres = 1 pound

Main Article

See also
BA/BMA Issues;
British Occupation Issues;
Middle East Forces (MEF)

== Egypt (French Post Offices) ==
Dates
1899–1931
Currency
(1899) 100 centimes = 1 franc
(1921) 1000 milliemes = 100 piastres = 1 pound
Main Article
French post offices in Egypt
Includes
Alexandria (French Post Office);
Port Said (French Post Office)

== Egyptian Occupation Issues ==
Main Article

Includes
Gaza;
Palestine

== Egyptian Post Offices in the Turkish Empire ==
Refer
Egypt

== Éire ==
Refer
Republic of Ireland

== Ellas (ELLAS) ==
Refer
Greece

== Ellice Islands ==
Refer
Gilbert & Ellice Islands;
Tuvalu

== Elobey, Annobón, and Corisco ==
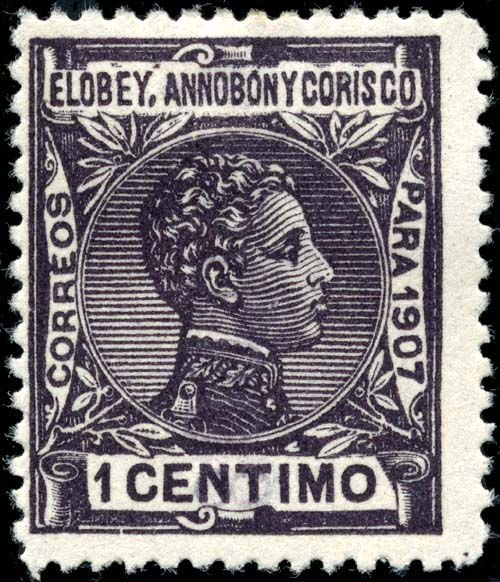
1 centimo, 1907

Dates
1903–1908
Capital
Currency
100 centimos = 1 peseta

Refer
Spanish Guinea

== El Salvador ==
Dates
1867 –
Capital
San Salvador
Currency
(1867) 8 reales = 100 centavos = 1 peso
(1912) 100 centavos = 1 colon

Main Article
Postage stamps and postal history of El Salvador

== Elsass ==
Refer
Alsace (German Occupation)

== England ==
Refer
Great Britain

== Epirus ==
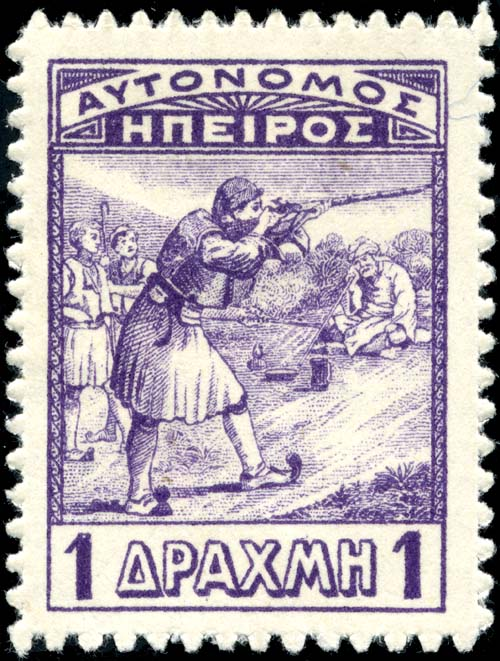
Epirus – 1-drachma value of the infantryman issue of March 1914

Dates
1914–1916
Capital
Ioannina
Currency
100 lepta = 1 drachma

Includes
Northern Epirus

See also
Greek Occupation Issues

== Equatorial Guinea ==
Dates
1968 –
Capital
Malabo (formerly Santa Isabel)
Currency
(1968) 100 centimos = 1 pesete
(1973) 100 centimos = 1 ekuele
(1981) biptwele

Main Article
Postage stamps and postal history of Equatorial Guinea

== Eritrea ==
Dates
1893–1942; 1993 –
Capital
Asmara
Currency
100 centesimi = 1 lira

Main Article
Postage stamps and postal history of Eritrea

See also
Ethiopia;
Italian East Africa

== Eritrea (British Administration) ==
Dates
1950–1952
Currency
100 cents = 1 shilling

Refer
BA/BMA Issues

== Eritrea (British Military Administration) ==
Dates
1948–1950
Currency
100 cents = 1 shilling

Refer
BA/BMA Issues

== Eritrea (British Occupation) ==
Refer
Eritrea (British Administration);
Eritrea (British Military Administration)

== Est Africain Allemand Occupation Belge ==
Refer
German East Africa (Belgian Occupation)

== Estado da India ==
Refer
Portuguese India

== Estero ==
Refer
Italian Post Offices Abroad

== Estonia ==
Dates
1918 - 1940, 1991 –
Capital
Tallinn
Currency
(1991) 100 kopecks = 1 Russian ruble
(1992) 100 senti = 1 kroon

Main Article
Postage stamps and postal history of Estonia

Includes
Estonia (pre–Soviet)

See also
Union of Soviet Socialist Republics (USSR)

== Estonia (German Occupation) ==
Dates
1941 only
Currency
100 senti = 1 kroon

Refer
German Occupation Issues (WWII)

== Estonia (pre-Soviet) ==
Dates
1918–1940
Capital
Tallinn
Currency
(1918) 100 kopecks = 1 Russian ruble
(1919) 100 penni = 1 mark
(1928) 100 senti = 1 kroon

Refer
Estonia

== Ethiopia (Abyssinia) ==
Dates
1894 –
Capital
Addis Ababa
Currency
(1894) 16 guerche = 1 thaler
(1905) 100 centimes = 1 franc
(1907) 16 guerche = 1 thaler
(1908) 16 piastres = 1 thaler
(1928) 16 mehaleks = 1 thaler
(1936) 100 centimes = 1 thaler
(1936) 100 centesimi = 1 lira
(1946) 100 cents = 1 dollar
(1976) 100 cents = 1 birr

Main Article
Postage stamps and postal history of Ethiopia

See also
Eritrea;
Ethiopia (Italian Occupation);
Italian East Africa

== Ethiopia (French Post Offices) ==
Dates
1906–1908
Currency
100 centimes = 1 franc

Refer
French Post Offices Abroad

== Ethiopia (Italian Occupation) ==
Dates
1936 only
Currency
100 centesimi = 1 lira

Refer
Italian Occupation Issues

See also
Ethiopia;
Italian East Africa

== Eupen & Malmedy (Belgian Occupation) ==
Dates
1920 only
Currency
(1920: initial issue) 100 pfennige = 1 Reichsmark
(1920: later issues) 100 centimes = 1 franc

Refer
Belgian Occupation Issues

== Bibliography ==
- Stanley Gibbons Ltd, Europe and Colonies 1970, Stanley Gibbons Ltd, 1969
- Stanley Gibbons Ltd, various catalogues
- Stuart Rossiter & John Flower, The Stamp Atlas, W H Smith, 1989
- XLCR Stamp Finder and Collector's Dictionary, Thomas Cliffe Ltd, c.1960
