= Compendium of postage stamp issuers (Me–Mz) =

Each "article" in this category is a collection of entries about several stamp issuers, presented in alphabetical order. The entries are formulated on the micro model and so provide summary information about all known issuers.

See the Category:Compendium of postage stamp issuers page for details of the project.

== Mecklenburg-Schwerin ==
Dates
1856–1868
Capital
Schwerin
Currency
48 schillings = 1 thaler

Refer
German States

== Mecklenburg-Strelitz ==
Dates
1864–1868
Capital
Strelitz
Currency
30 silbergroschen = 1 thaler

Refer
German States

== Mecklenburg-Vorpommern (Russian Zone) ==
Dates
1945–1946
Capital
Schwerin
Currency
100 pfennige = 1 mark

Refer
Germany (Allied Occupation)

== MEF ==
Refer
Middle East Forces (MEF)

== Melaka ==
Refer
Malacca

== Memel (French Administration) ==
Dates
1920–1923
Currency
100 pfennige = 1 mark

Refer
French Occupation Issues

== Memel (Lithuanian Occupation) ==
Refer
Klaipėda

== Mengkiang (Japanese Occupation) ==
Dates
1942–1945
Currency
100 cents = 1 dollar

Refer
Japanese Occupation Issues

== Mengtse ==
Refer
Mong-Tseu (Indochinese Post Offices)

== Mesopotamia ==
Refer
Mosul (Indian Forces)

== Metelin ==
Refer
Mytilene (Russian Post Office)

== Mexico ==
Dates
1856 –
Capital
Mexico City
Currency
8 reales = 100 centavos = 1 peso

== Micronesia, Federated States of ==
Dates
1984 –
Capital
Palikir

Currency
100 cents = 1 dollar

Main Article
Postage stamps and postal history of the Federated States of Micronesia

== Middle Congo ==
Dates
1907–1937
Capital
Brazzaville
Currency
100 centimes = 1 franc

Main Article Needed

See also
Congo Republic;
French Congo;
French Equatorial Africa

== Middle East Forces (MEF) ==
Dates
1942–1947
Currency
12 pence = 1 shilling; 20 shillings = 1 pound

Main Article Needed

See also
BA/BMA Issues;
British Occupation Issues;
Egypt (British Forces)

== Midway Islands ==
Refer
United States of America (USA)

== Modena ==
Dates
1852–1860
Capital
Modena
Currency
100 centesimi = 1 lira

Refer
Italian States

== Moheli ==
Dates
1906–1914
Capital
Currency
100 centimes = 1 franc

Refer
Madagascar & Dependencies

== Moldavia ==
Dates
1858–1862
Capital
Iași
Currency
40 parale = 1 piastre

Refer
Romania

== Moldo-Wallachia ==
Dates
1862–1865
Capital
Bucharest
Currency
40 parale = 1 piastre

Refer
Romania

== Moldova ==
Dates
1991 –
Capital
Kishinev
Currency
(1991) 100 kopecks = 1 Russian ruble
(1993) kupon (temporary currency)
(1993) 100 bani = 1 leu

Main Article Postage stamps and postal history of Moldova

See also
Union of Soviet Socialist Republics (USSR)

== Moluccas ==
Refer
Japanese Naval Control Area

== Monaco ==
Dates
1885 –
Capital
Monte Carlo
Currency
(1885) 100 centimes = 1 franc
(2002) 100 cent = 1 euro

Main Article Needed

== Mongolia ==
Dates
1924–
Capital
Ulaanbaatar
Currency
(1924) 100 cents = 1 Mongolian dollar
(1926) 100 möngö = 1 Mongolian tögrög

Main Article Needed

== Mong-Tseu (Indochinese Post Office) ==
Dates
1903–1922
Currency
(1903) 100 centimes = 1 franc
(1919) 100 cents = 1 piastre

Refer
China (Indochinese Post Offices)

== Mongtze ==
Refer
Mong-Tseu (Indochinese Post Offices)

== Mont-Athos ==
Refer
Mount Athos (Russian Post Office)

== Montenegro ==
Dates
1874–1918; 2006 –
Capital
Podgorica
Currency
(1874) 100 novcic = 1 florin
(1902) 100 heller = 1 krone
(1907) 100 para = 1 krone (note: in 1910 only, krone were called perper)
(2006) 100 cent = 1 euro

Main Article Needed

Includes
Montenegro (Yugoslav Regional Issues)

See also
Yugoslavia

== Montenegro (Austrian Occupation) ==
Dates
1917 only
Currency
100 heller = 1 krone

Refer
Austro–Hungarian Military Post

== Montenegro (German Occupation) ==
Dates
1943–1945
Currency
(1943) 100 centesimi = 1 lira
(1944) 100 pfennige = 1 mark

Refer
German Occupation Issues (WW2)

== Montenegro (Italian Occupation) ==
Dates
1941–1943
Currency
(1941) 100 paras = 1 dinar
(1941) 100 centesimi = 1 lira

Refer
Italian Occupation Issues

== Montenegro (Yugoslav Regional Issues) ==
Dates
1945 only
Capital
Titograd (Podgorica)
Currency
100 centesimi = 1 lira

Refer
Montenegro

== Montserrat ==
Dates
1876 –
Capital
Plymouth
Currency
(1876) 12 pence = 1 shilling; 20 shillings = 1 pound
(1951) 100 cents = 1 dollar

Main Article Needed

== Morocco ==
Dates
1956 –
Capital
Rabat
Currency
(1956) 100 centimos = 1 peseta (Northern Zone)
(1956) 100 centimes = 1 franc (Southern Zone)
(1958) 100 centimes = 1 franc (whole country)
(1962) 100 francs = 1 dirham

Includes
Northern Zone, Morocco;
Sherifian Post;
Southern Zone, Morocco

== Morocco Agencies ==
Dates
1898–1957
Currency
British, French and Spanish all used

Main Article Needed

See also
Tangier

== Morocco (British Post Offices) ==
Refer
Morocco Agencies

== Morocco (French Post Offices) ==
Dates
1862–1914
Currency
100 centimos = 1 peseta

Refer
French Post Offices Abroad

== Morocco (German Post Offices) ==
Dates
1899–1917
Currency
100 centimos = 1 peseta

Refer
German Post Offices Abroad

== Morocco (Spanish Post Offices) ==
Dates
1903–1914
Currency
100 centimos = 1 peseta

Refer
Spanish Post Offices Abroad

== Morvi ==
Dates
1931–1948
Currency
12 pies = 1 anna; 16 annas = 1 rupee

Refer
Indian Native States

== Mosul (Indian Forces) ==
Dates
1919 only
Currency
12 pies = 1 anna; 16 annas = 1 rupee

Refer
Indian Overseas Forces

== Mount Athos (Russian Post Office) ==
Dates
1909–1914
Currency
40 paras = 1 piastre

Refer
Russian Post Offices in the Turkish Empire

== Moyen Congo ==
Refer
Middle Congo

== Mozambique ==
Dates
1876 –
Capital
Maputo (formerly Lourenço Marques)
Currency
(1876) 1000 reis = 1 milreis
(1913) 100 centavos = 1 escudo
(1980) 100 centavos = 1 metical

Main Article Needed

See also
Africa (Portuguese Colonies)

== Mozambique Company ==
Dates
1892–1942
Currency
(1892) 1000 reis = 1 milreis
(1913) 100 centavos = 1 escudo

Main Article Needed

== Mozambique Territories ==
Main Article Needed

Includes
Inhambane;
Kionga;
Lourenço Marques;
Quelimane;
Tete;
Zambezia

== Muscat ==
Dates
1944–1948
Capital
Muscat
Currency
12 pies = 1 anna, 16 annas = 1 rupee

Refer
Muscat & Oman

See also
British Postal Agencies in Eastern Arabia;
Oman

== Muscat & Oman ==
Dates
1966–1970
Capital
Muscat
Currency
(1966) 64 baizas = 1 rupee;
(1970) 1000 baizas = 1 rial saidi

Main Article Needed

Includes
Muscat

See also
British Postal Agencies in Eastern Arabia;
Oman

== Mustique ==
Refer
Grenadines of St Vincent

== Mutawakelite Kingdom ==
Refer
Yemen (Mutawakelite Kingdom)

== Myanmar ==
Refer
Burma

== Mytilene (Russian Post Office) ==
Dates
1909–1914
Currency
40 paras = 1 piastre

Refer
Russian Post Offices in the Turkish Empire

== Bibliography ==
- Stanley Gibbons Ltd, Europe and Colonies 1970, Stanley Gibbons Ltd, 1969
- Stanley Gibbons Ltd, various catalogues
- Stuart Rossiter & John Flower, The Stamp Atlas, W H Smith, 1989
- XLCR Stamp Finder and Collector's Dictionary, Thomas Cliffe Ltd, c.1960
