= Silbergroschen =

The Silbergroschen was a coin used in Prussia and several other German Confederation states in northern Germany during the 19th century, worth one thirtieth of a Thaler.

The first Silbergroschen was issued by the Electorate of Saxony in 1475. This series ended in the 1550s, but the coin was reintroduced in Prussia in 1821 and was adopted by over a dozen other kingdoms, duchies and principalities as they switched to using the Prussian currency system of 12 Pfennig = 1 Silbergroschen, 30 Silbergroschen = 1 Thaler (name changed to Vereinsthaler after 1857).

Silbergroschen were replaced with 10 Pfennig pieces when the German Empire decimalized following unification in 1871.

== See also ==
- Saxon coin history
