= Compendium of postage stamp issuers (Ba–Be) =

Each "article" in this category is a collection of entries about several stamp issuers, presented in alphabetical order. The entries themselves are formulated on the micro model and so provide summary information about all known issuers.

See the Category:Compendium of postage stamp issuers page for details of the project.

== BA/BMA Issues ==
Main Article Needed

Includes
Eritrea (British Administration);
Eritrea (British Military Administration);
Malaya (British Military Administration);
North Borneo (British Military Administration);
Sarawak (British Military Administration);
Somalia (British Administration);
Somalia (British Military Administration);
Tripolitania (British Administration);
Tripolitania (British Military Administration)

See also
British Occupation Issues;
British Occupation of Italian Colonies;
East Africa Forces;
Egypt (British Forces);
Middle East Forces

== BA Eritrea ==
Refer
Eritrea (British Administration)

== BA Somalia ==
Refer
Somalia (British Administration)

== BA Tripolitania ==
Refer
Tripolitania (British Administration)

== Baden ==
Became part of Germany in 1871.

Dates
1851–1871
Capital
Karlsruhe
Currency
60 kreuzer = 1 gulden

Main Article
Postage stamps and postal history of Baden

== Baden (French Zone) ==
Dates
1947–1949
Currency
(1947) 100 pfennige = 1 Reichsmark
(1948) 100 pfennige = 1 DM

Refer
Germany (Allied Occupation)

== Baghdad (British Occupation) ==
British occupation forces issued Turkish stamps overprinted BAGHDAD IN BRITISH OCCUPATION.

Dates
1917 only
Currency
12 pies = 1 anna; 16 annas = 1 rupee

Refer
British Occupation Issues

== Bahamas ==
Self-government was introduced on January 7, 1964. The islands became an independent member of the Commonwealth of Nations on July 10, 1973.

Dates
1859 –
Capital
Nassau
Currency
(1859) 12 pence = 1 shilling; 20 shillings = 1 pound
(1966) 100 cents = 1 dollar

Main article
Postage stamps and postal history of the Bahamas

== Bahawalpur ==
Pakistan stamps in use since 1949.

Dates
1945–1949
Capital
Bahawalpur
Currency
12 pies = 1 anna; 16 annas = 1 rupee

Main Article
Postage stamps and postal history of Bahawalpur

== Bahrain ==
A group of islands 20 miles east of the Arabian peninsula and joined to Saudi Arabia by causeway. The largest is Bahrain itself. The site has been inhabited for over 5000 years. Bahrain was under British protection 1861–1971 and is now fully independent. Indian and British postal administration was used until 1 January 1966 when Bahrain opened its own service.

Bahrain used Indian stamps 1883–1933. Since then it has had its own stamps but also used general issues of British PAs in Eastern Arabia during shortages in the 1950s.

Issues during 1933–1947 were Indian stamps overprinted BAHRAIN. During 1948–59 British stamps were used, again overprinted BAHRAIN. The first stamps exclusive to Bahrain were issued on 1 July 1960.

Dates
1933 –
Capital
Manama
Currency
(1933) 12 pies = 1 anna; 16 annas = 1 rupee
(1957) 100 naye paise = 1 rupee
(1966) 100 fils = 1 dinar

Main Article
Postage stamps and postal history of Bahrain

See also
British Postal Agencies in Eastern Arabia

== Baluchistan ==
Refer
Las Bela

== Bamra ==
Dates
1888–1890
Currency
12 pies = 1 anna; 16 annas = 1 rupee

Refer
Indian Native States

== Banat Bacska (Romanian Occupation) ==
Romanian occupation of Hungary. The area was subsequently split between Romania and Yugoslavia.

Dates
1919–1920
Capital
Temesvar (Timișoara)
Currency
100 filler = 1 korona

Refer
Romanian Post Abroad

== Bangkok (British Post Office) ==
British PO issued 1867 Straits Settlements stamps with an overprint of B.

Dates
1882–1885
Currency
100 cents = 1 dollar

Refer
British Post Offices Abroad

== Bangladesh ==
Formerly East Pakistan.

Dates
1971 –
Capital
Dhaka
Currency
(1971) 100 paisa = 1 rupee
(1972) 100 paisa = 1 taka

Main Article
Postage stamps and postal history of Bangladesh

== Baranya (Serbian Occupation) ==
Serbian occupation of Hungary.

Dates
1919 only
Capital
Pécs
Currency
100 filler = 1 korona

Refer
Serbian Occupation Issues

== Barbados ==
Self-government was attained on 16 October 1961. Became an independent member of the Commonwealth of Nations on 30 November 1966.

Dates
1852 –
Capital
Bridgetown
Currency
(1852) 12 pence = 1 shilling; 20 shillings = 1 pound
(1950) 100 cents = 1 dollar

Main Article
Postage stamps and postal history of Barbados

== Barbuda ==
Barbuda is one of the islands making up the state of Antigua and Barbuda. It had a separate issue in 1922 of overprinted Leeward Islands stamps (11 values). Apart from this, it used stamps of Antigua and Leeward Islands concurrently until 1968. During 1971–1973, Antigua stamps were in sole use. Barbuda has had its own stamps on a regular basis 1968–1971 and since 1973. Barbuda stamps are valid in Antigua and vice versa.

Dates
1922 –
Capital
Codrington
Currency
(1922) 12 pence = 1 shilling; 20 shillings = 1 pound
(1968) 100 cents = 1 dollar

Refer
Antigua and Barbuda

Main article
Postage stamps and postal history of Barbuda

== Barwani ==
Dates
1921–1938
Currency
12 pies = 1 anna; 16 annas = 1 rupee

Refer
Indian Native States

== Bashahr ==
Refer
Bussahir

== Basle ==
Swiss Cantonal Administration issue on 1 July 1845 was of one stamp only. This was valued at 21/2 rappen and inscribed STADT POST BASEL.

Dates
1845 only
Currency
100 rappen = 1 franken

Refer
Swiss Cantonal Issues

== Basutoland ==
Used Cape of Good Hope stamps 1880–1933 and became Lesotho in 1966.

Dates
1933–1966
Capital
Maseru
Currency
(1933) 12 pence = 1 shilling; 20 shillings = 1 pound
(1961) 100 cents = 1 rand

Main Article Needed

See also
Lesotho

== Batum (British Occupation) ==
Batum is a Georgian Black Sea port which had been captured by Turkey in April 1918. It was occupied by British forces December 1918 to 6 July 1920 when it was included in the Republic of Georgia.

Separate stamps were issued by Batum in 1919. In addition, several issues of both these and Russian types were overprinted BRITISH OCCUPATION.

Dates
1919–1920
Currency
100 kopecks = 1 Georgian rouble

Refer
British Occupation Issues

== Bavaria ==
Stamps are inscribed BAYERN.

Dates
1849–1920
Capital
Munich
Currency
(1849) 60 kreuzer = 1 gulden
(1874) 100 pfennige = 1 mark

Main Article Needed

== Bechuanaland ==
Previously Bechuanaland Protectorate; now Botswana.

Dates
1965–1966
Capital
Mafeking
Currency
100 cents = 1 rand

Refer
Bechuanaland Protectorate

== Bechuanaland Protectorate ==
The territory north of the Molopo river which became Botswana in 1966.

The first issues 1888–1889 were overprinted Great Britain, British Bechuanaland and Cape of Good Hope types. During 1890–1897, British Bechuanaland stamps were used. From October 1897, overprinted Great Britain were used until 12 December 1932 when specific stamps for the Protectorate were first issued.

Dates
1888–1965
Capital
Mafeking
Currency
(1888) 12 pence = 1 shilling; 20 shillings = 1 pound
(1961) 100 cents = 1 rand

Includes
Bechuanaland

Main article
Postage stamps and postal history of Bechuanaland Protectorate

See also
Botswana;
British Bechuanaland;
Cape of Good Hope

== Beirut ==
Stamps were issued by British, French and Russian post offices. The British office was open 1873–1914: one issue of 1906 was particular to this office which normally issued British Levant. The French office was open 1840–1914: one issue of 1905 was particular to the office which otherwise issued French stamps (to 1885) or French Levant (1885–1914). The Russian office was open 1857–1914: particular stamps issued in 1879 and 1909–10; normally used Russia or Russian Levant.

Other offices were opened by Austria, Egypt, Germany and Italy. The German office was open 1900–14 and used German Levant. The Italian office was open 1873–83 and used the ESTERO overprints. The Austrian office used Austrian Levant and the Egyptian office used Egypt.

Refer
Beirut (British Post Office);
Beirut (French Post Office);
Beirut (Russian Post Office)

See also
Austro–Hungarian Post Offices in the Turkish Empire;
British Post Offices in the Turkish Empire;
Egyptian Post Offices in the Turkish Empire;
French Post Offices in the Turkish Empire;
German Post Offices in the Turkish Empire;
Italian Post Offices in the Turkish Empire;
Russian Post Offices in the Turkish Empire

== Beirut (British Post Office) ==
The office was open 1873–1914 and normally used stamps of British Levant. One issue on 2 July 1906 was particular to Beirut. This consisted of one stamp with an overprint of 1 Piastre, the stamp used being the twopence Edward VII definitive (green and carmine) that was first issued in Britain during September 1905.

Dates
1906 only
Currency
40 paras = 1 piastre

Refer
British Post Offices in the Turkish Empire

== Beirut (French Post Office) ==
The office was open 1840–1914 and normally used stamps of France (to 1885) or French Levant (1885–1914). One issue of 17 January 1905 was particular to Beirut. This consisted of a single French stamp overprinted by 1 Piastre Beyrouth.

Dates
1905 only
Currency
40 paras = 1 piastre

Refer
French Post Offices in the Turkish Empire

== Beirut (Russian Post Office) ==
The office was open 1857–1914 and normally used stamps of Russia or Russian Levant. Occasional issues in 1879 and again in 1909–10 were particular to Beirut. These were Russian Levant types overprinted by Beyrouth and a value.

Dates
1879–1910
Currency
40 paras = 1 piastre

Refer
Russian Post Offices in the Turkish Empire

== Belarus ==
Formerly part of the Russian Empire and the USSR, Belarus became independent in 1991 and began its own postal administration in 1992.

It has previously been called Byelorussia or Byelorussian Soviet Socialist Republic.

Dates
1992 –
Capital
Minsk
Currency
100 kopecks = 1 Belarusian rubel

Main Article
Postage stamps and postal history of Belarus

See also
Union of Soviet Socialist Republics (USSR)

== Bibliography ==
- Stanley Gibbons Ltd, Europe and Colonies 1970, Stanley Gibbons Ltd, 1969
- Stanley Gibbons Ltd, various catalogues
- Stuart Rossiter & John Flower, The Stamp Atlas, W H Smith, 1989
- XLCR Stamp Finder and Collector's Dictionary, Thomas Cliffe Ltd, c.1960
