= Compendium of postage stamp issuers (Sa–Sb) =

Each "article" in this category is a collection of entries about several stamp issuers, presented in alphabetical order. The entries are formulated on the micro model and so provide summary information about all known issuers.

See the Category:Compendium of postage stamp issuers page for details of the project.

== Saar ==
Dates
1947 – 1959
Capital
Saarbrücken
Currency
(1947) 100 pfennige = 1 Saar mark
(1947) 100 centimes = 1 Saar franc

Includes
Saar (French Administration)

== Saar (French Administration) ==
Dates
1920 – 1935
Capital
Saarbrücken
Currency
(1920) 100 pfennige = 1 mark
(1921) 100 centimes = 1 franc

Refer
Saar

== Saar (French Zone) ==
Stamps used were French Zone (General Issue) types which are cat. nos F1–F13 of Germany. They were replaced in 1947 by stamps specific to the Saar.

Dates
1945 – 1947
Capital
Saarbrücken
Currency
100 pfennige = 1 mark

Refer
Germany (Allied Occupation)

== Saargebiet ==
Refer
Saar

== Saarland ==
Refer
Saar

== Sabah ==
Dates
1964 –
Capital
Kota Kinabalu
Currency
100 cents = 1 dollar

Main Article Needed

See also
Malaysia;
North Borneo

== Sachsen ==
Refer
Saxony

== Sahara Espanol ==
Refer
Spanish Sahara

== St Christopher ==
Dates
1870 – 1890
Capital
Basseterre
Currency
12 pence = 1 shilling; 20 shillings = 1 pound

Refer
St Kitts

== St Christopher Nevis & Anguilla ==
Dates
1952 – 1980
Capital
Basseterre
Currency
100 cents = 1 dollar

Main Article Needed

Includes
St Kitts-Nevis;
St Kitts Nevis & Anguilla

See also
Anguilla;
Leeward Islands;
Nevis;
St Kitts

== St Helena ==
Dates
1856 –
Capital
Jamestown
Currency
(1856) 12 pence = 1 shilling; 20 shillings = 1 pound
(1971) 100 pence = 1 pound

Main Article Needed

== St Kitts ==
Dates
1980 –
Capital
Basseterre
Currency
100 cents = 1 dollar

Main Article Needed

Includes
St Christopher

See also
Leeward Islands;
St Christopher Nevis & Anguilla

== St Kitts-Nevis ==
Dates
1903 – 1980
Capital
Basseterre
Currency
(1903) 12 pence = 1 shilling; 20 shillings = 1 pound
(1951) 100 cents = 1 dollar

Refer
St Christopher Nevis & Anguilla

== St Kitts Nevis & Anguilla ==
Dates
1967 – 1971
Capital
Basseterre
Currency
100 cents = 1 dollar

Refer
St Christopher Nevis & Anguilla

== St Lucia ==
Dates
1860 –
Capital
Castries
Currency
(1860) 12 pence = 1 shilling; 20 shillings = 1 pound
(1949) 100 cents = 1 dollar

Main Article Postage stamps and postal history of St. Lucia

== St Paul ==
Refer
French Southern & Antarctic Territories

== St Pierre et Miquelon ==
Dates
1885 – 1978
Capital
Saint-Pierre
Currency
100 centimes = 1 franc

Main Article Needed

== St Thomas & Prince Islands ==
Refer
Sao Tome e Principe

== St Vincent ==
Dates
1861 –
Capital
Kingstown
Currency
(1861) 12 pence = 1 shilling; 20 shillings = 1 pound
(1949) 100 cents = 1 dollar

Main Article Postage stamps and postal history of St. Vincent and the Grenadines

== Ste Marie de Madagascar ==
Dates
1894 – 1896
Capital
Currency
100 centimes = 1 franc

Refer
Madagascar & Dependencies

== Salonicco ==
Refer
Salonika (Italian Post Office)

== Salonika (British Field Office) ==
British stamps overprinted Levant.

Dates
1916 only
Currency
12 pence = 1 shilling; 20 shillings = 1 pound

Refer
British Post Offices in the Turkish Empire

== Salonika (Italian Post Office) ==
Italian Post Office in Salonika when still under Turkish rule. Issued Italian stamps overprinted SALONICCO.

Dates
1909 – 1911
Currency
40 paras = 1 piastre

Refer
Italian Post Offices in the Turkish Empire

== Salonika (Russian Post Office) ==
Local overprint SALONIQUE. The office normally used stamps of Russia or Russian Levant.

Dates
1909 – 1914
Currency
40 paras = 1 piastre

Refer
Russian Post Offices in the Turkish Empire

== Salonique ==
Refer
Salonika (Russian Post Office)

== Samoa ==
Dates
1982 –
Capital
Apia
Currency
100 sene (cents) = 1 dollar

Main Article Postage stamps and postal history of Samoa

Includes
Samoa (Kingdom);
Samoa I Sisifo;
Samoa (New Zealand Administration);
Western Samoa

See also
German Samoa

== Samoa (Kingdom) ==
Dates
1877 – 1900
Capital
Apia
Currency
12 pence = 1 shilling; 20 shillings = 1 pound

Refer
Samoa

== Samoa I Sisifo ==
Dates
1958 – 1982
Capital
Apia
Currency
(1958) 12 pence = 1 shilling; 20 shillings = 1 pound
(1967) 100 sene (cents) = 1 dollar

Refer
Samoa

== Samoa (New Zealand Administration) ==
Dates
1914 – 1935
Capital
Apia
Currency
12 pence = 1 shilling; 20 shillings = 1 pound

Refer
Samoa

== Samos ==
Samos had been an independent principality, nominally under Turkish control, but with British, French and Russian protection. A revolt took place in September 1912 and the Turkish garrison withdrew. A provisional government was established under President Sophoulis, who sought political union with Greece. This was achieved by the Treaty of London on 30 May 1913.

Samos issued its own stamps from November 1912. There were four issues and 19 stamps in all. Greek stamps were introduced in 1914, but there were also overprints of the Samos types until 1915.

Dates
1912 – 1915
Capital
Vathy
Currency
100 lepta = 1 drachma

Main Article Needed

See also
Vathy (French Post Office)

== San Marino ==
Dates
1877 –
Capital
San Marino
Currency
(1877) 100 centesimi = 1 lira
(2002) 100 cent = 1 euro

Main Article Needed

== Sandjak d'Alexandrette ==
Refer
Hatay

== Santander ==
Dates
1884 – 1903
Currency
100 centavos = 1 peso

Refer
Colombian Territories

== Sao Tome e Principe ==
Dates
1870 –
Capital
Sao Tome
Currency
(1870) 1000 reis = 1 milreis
(1913) 100 centavos = 1 escudo
(1977) 100 cents = 1 dobra

Main Article Needed

See also
Africa (Portuguese Colonies)

== Sarajevo Government (Bosnia) ==
Refer
Bosnia & Herzegovina

== Sarawak ==
Dates
1869 –
Capital
Kuching
Currency
100 cents = 1 dollar

Main Article Needed

See also
Malaysia

== Sarawak (British Military Administration) ==
Dates
1945 only
Currency
100 cents = 1 dollar

Refer
BA/BMA Issues

== Sarawak (Japanese Occupation) ==
Dates
1942 – 1945
Currency
100 cents = 1 dollar

Refer
Japanese Occupation Issues

== Sardinia ==
Sardinia is a large island in the western Mediterranean, south of Corsica. Before the unification of Italy, the Kingdom of Sardinia was the name applied to a union of Sardinia and Piedmont, although the island was very much the junior partner. Stamps of this state were issued in Turin 1851–1862 but the country's name is not shown. Gibbons list these stamps under Sardinia, which is strictly correct, but historians generally refer to the state as Piedmont. To prevent confusion between the 19th century state and the present island province, this work has Piedmont as the specific entry and Sardinia as a minor entry.

Capital
Cagliari

Refer
Italian States;
Piedmont

== Sarkari ==
Refer
Soruth (Saurashtra)

== Sarre ==
Refer
Saar

== Saseno (Italian Occupation) ==
Dates
1923 only
Currency
100 centesimi = 1 lira

Refer
Italian Occupation Issues

== Saudi Arabia ==
Dates
1932 –
Capital
Riyadh
Currency
(1932) 110 guerche = 10 riyal = 1 gold sovereign
(1952) 440 guerche = 40 riyal = 1 gold sovereign
(1960) 100 halalas = 20 guerche = 1 riyal
(1976) 100 halalas = 1 riyal

Main Article Needed

Includes
Hejaz;
Hejaz-Nejd;
Nejd

== Saurashtra ==
Refer
Soruth (Saurashtra)

== Saxony ==
Dates
1850 – 1868
Capital
Dresden
Currency
10 pfennige = 1 neugroschen; 30 neugroschen = 1 thaler

Refer
German States

== Saxony (Russian Zone) ==
Dates
1945 – 1946
Capital
Halle
Currency
100 pfennige = 1 mark

Refer
Germany (Allied Occupation)

== Bibliography ==
- Stanley Gibbons Ltd, Europe and Colonies 1970, Stanley Gibbons Ltd, 1969
- Stanley Gibbons Ltd, various catalogues
- Stuart Rossiter & John Flower, The Stamp Atlas, W H Smith, 1989
- XLCR Stamp Finder and Collector's Dictionary, Thomas Cliffe Ltd, c.1960
