= Compendium of postage stamp issuers (R) =

Each "article" in this category is a collection of entries about several stamp issuers, presented in alphabetical order. The entries are formulated on the micro model and so provide summary information about all known issuers.

See the Category:Compendium of postage stamp issuers page for details of the project.

== Rab ==
Refer
Arbe

== Rajasthan ==
Dates
1948 – 1950
Currency
12 pies = 1 anna; 16 annas = 1 rupee

Refer
Indian Native States

== Rajnandgaon ==
Refer
Nandgaon

== Rajpipla ==
Dates
1880 – 1886
Currency
12 pies = 1 anna; 16 annas = 1 rupee

Refer
Indian Native States

== Rarotonga ==
Dates
1919 – 1932, 2011-
Currency
(1919) 12 pence = 1 shilling; 20 shillings = 1 pound
(2011) 100 cents = 1 dollar

Refer
Cook Islands

== Ras Al Khaima ==
Stamps issued 1967–72 were non-postal and are unrecognised.

Dates
1964 – 1966
Currency
(1964) 100 naye paise = 1 rupee
(1966) 100 dirhams = 1 riyal

Refer
Trucial States

== Redonda ==
Refer
Antigua

== Republic of China ==
Refer
Chinese Nationalist Republic (Taiwan);
Taiwan

== Republic of Ireland ==
Dates
1922 –
Capital
Dublin
Currency
(1922) 12 pence = 1 shilling; 20 shillings = 1 pound
(1971) 100 pence = 1 punt
(2002) 100 cent = 1 euro

Main Article Needed

== Republic of Maldives ==
Refer
Maldive Islands

== Republika Srpska ==
Refer
Bosnian Serb Republic

== Republique Libanaise ==
Refer
Lebanon

== Rethymnon (Russian Post Office) ==
Russia was one of the powers which occupied Crete in 1898. It had a post office at Rethymnon within its own sphere of administration. Four types were issued, overprinted RETHYMNO, and a total of 37 stamps.

Refer
Crete (Russian Post Offices)

== Reunion ==
Dates
1885 – 1974
Capital
Saint-Denis
Currency
100 centimes = 1 franc

Main Article Needed

== Rheinland-Pfalz ==
Refer
Rhineland-Palatinate (French Zone)

== Rhineland-Palatinate (French Zone) ==
Dates
1947 – 1949
Capital
Mainz
Currency
100 pfennige = 1 mark

Refer
Germany (Allied Occupation)

== Rhodes ==
Italian colony in the Dodecanese which used the general EGEO issues and had its own stamps inscribed RODI, the Italian name of the island.

Dates
1912 – 1935
Capital
Rodhos
Currency
100 centesimi = 1 lira

Refer
Aegean Islands (Dodecanese)

== Rhodesia ==
Dates
1965 – 1980
Capital
Salisbury
Currency
(1965) 12 pence = 1 shilling; 20 shillings = 1 pound
(1969) 100 cents = 1 dollar

Main Article Needed

Includes
Rhodesia (British Colonial Issues);
Southern Rhodesia

See also
Zimbabwe

== Rhodesia (British Colonial Issues) ==
Dates
1909 – 1924
Capital
Salisbury
Currency
12 pence = 1 shilling; 20 shillings = 1 pound

Refer
Rhodesia

== Rhodesia & Nyasaland ==
Dates
1954 – 1964
Capital
Salisbury
Currency
12 pence = 1 shilling; 20 shillings = 1 pound

Main Article Needed

== Riau-Lingga Archipelago ==
Dates
1954 – 1965
Capital
Tandjungpinang
Currency
100 sen = 1 rupiah

Main Article Needed

See also
Indonesia

== Rijeka ==
Refer
Fiume (Yugoslav Occupation)

== Rio de Oro ==
Dates
1905 – 1924
Capital
Villa Cisneros
Currency
100 centimos = 1 peseta

Refer
Spanish West Africa

== Rio Muni ==
Dates
1960 – 1968
Capital
Bata
Currency
100 centimos = 1 peseta

Refer
Spanish Guinea

== Rizeh (Russian Post Office) ==
Dates
1909 – 1910
Currency
40 paras = 1 piastre

Refer
Russian Post Offices in the Turkish Empire

== Rodi ==
Refer
Rhodes

== Romagna ==
Dates
1859 – 1860
Capital
Bologna
Currency
100 bajocchi = 1 scudo

Refer
Italian States

== Roman States ==
Refer
Papal States

== Romania ==
Dates
1865 –
Capital
Bucharest
Currency
(1865) 40 parale = 1 piastre
(1867) 100 bani = 1 leu

Includes
Moldavia;
Moldo–Wallachia

== Romania (Austrian Occupation) ==
Dates
1917 – 1918
Currency
100 bani = 1 leu

Refer
Austro–Hungarian Military Post

== Romania (Bulgarian Occupation) ==
Refer
Dobruja (Bulgarian Occupation)

== Romania (German Occupation) ==
Dates
1917 – 1918
Currency
100 bani = 1 leu

Refer
German Occupation Issues (WW1)

== Romanian Post Abroad ==
Main Article Needed

Includes
Banat Bacska (Romanian Occupation);
Constantinople (Romanian Post Office);
Debrecen (Romanian Occupation);
Hungary (Romanian Occupation);
Romanian Post Offices in the Turkish Empire;
Temesvar (Romanian Occupation);
Transylvania (Romanian Occupation)

== Romanian Post Offices in the Turkish Empire ==
Dates
1896 – 1919
Currency
(1896) 40 paras = 1 piastre
(1919) 100 bani = 1 leu

Refer
Romanian Post Abroad

== ROPiT ==
Abbreviation of Russkoe Obshchestvo Parokhudstva i Torgovl (Р.О.П.и.Т. - Русское общество пароходства и торговли), meaning Russian Steam Navigation and Trading Company. The Russian post offices in the Turkish Empire were run by R.O.P.i.T. General issues were in use throughout the period but several local overprints were introduced in 1909. This included the offices at Mytilene, Salonika and Mount Athos. Other Russian POs in Greece were at Kandia, Volos (Thessaly), Port Lagos (Thrace), Khios and Rhodes.

Refer
Russian Post Offices in the Turkish Empire

Dates
1863 – 1914
Currency
(1863) 100 kopecks = 1 Russian ruble, (1900) 40 paras = 1 piastre

== Ross Dependency ==
Dates
1957 –
Capital
Scott Base
Currency
(1957) 12 pence = 1 shilling; 20 shillings = 1 pound
(1968) 100 cents = 1 dollar

== Rouad Island ==
Refer
Ile Rouad

== Ruanda-Urundi ==
Dates
1924 – 1962
Capital
Usumbura
Currency
100 centimes = 1 franc

Main Article Needed

See also
Belgian Congo;
Burundi;
Rwanda

== Rumania ==
Refer
Romania

== Russia ==
Stamps issued are cat. nos 63–11 onwards of Russia.

Dates
1992 –
Capital
Moscow
Currency
100 kopecks = 1 Russian ruble

Main Article Needed

Includes
Russia (pre–Soviet)

See also
Union of Soviet Socialist Republics (USSR)

== Russia (pre-Soviet) ==
Stamps issued were cat. nos 1–324 of Russia.

Dates
1858 – 1923
Capital
Moscow
Currency
100 kopecks = 1 Russian ruble

Refer
Russia

== Russia (German Occupation) ==
Refer
Ostland;
Ukraine (German Occupation)

== Russian Army Issues ==
Refer
North Western Army;
Northern Army;
Western Army

== Russian Civil War Issues ==
The Russian Civil War (25 October 1917 – October 1922) was a multi-party war in the former Russian Empire fought between the Bolshevik Red Army and the White Army, the loosely allied anti-Bolshevik forces. Many foreign armies warred against the Red Army, notably the Allied Forces and the pro-German armies. The Red Army defeated the White Armed Forces of South Russia in Ukraine and the army led by Aleksandr Kolchak in Siberia in 1919. The remains of the White forces commanded by Pyotr Nikolayevich Wrangel were beaten in the Crimea and were evacuated in the autumn of 1920.

Stamps were issued by various Russian armies and other parties.

Includes
Amur Province;
Ataman Semyonov Regime (Transbaikal);
Crimea;
Denikin Government;
Don Territory;
Far Eastern Republic;
Kolchak Government (Siberia);
Kuban Territory;
North Ingermanland;
North Western Army;
Northern Army;
Priamur & Maritime Provinces;
Siberia (Czechoslovak Army);
Transbaikal Province;
Western Army;
Wrangel Government

See also
USSR Issues for the Far East

== Russian Occupation Issues ==
Main Article Needed

Includes
North Korea (Russian Occupation);
South Lithuania (Russian Occupation)

== Russian Post Offices Abroad ==
Main Article Needed

Includes
China (Russian Post Offices);
Crete (Russian Post Offices)

== Russian Post Offices in the Turkish Empire ==
Russia had many post offices in the Turkish Empire which were run by ROPiT. General issues were in use throughout the period but several local overprints were introduced in 1909. This included the offices at Mytilene, Salonika and Mount Athos. Other Russian POs in Greece were at Kandia, Volos (Thessaly), Port Lagos (Thrace), Khios and Rhodes.

Dates
1863 – 1914
Currency
(1863) 100 kopecks = 1 Russian ruble
(1900) 40 paras = 1 piastre

Main Article Needed

Includes
Beirut (Russian Post Office);
Constantinople (Russian Post Office);
Dardanelles (Russian Post Offices);
Jaffa (Russian Post Office);
Jerusalem (Russian Post Office);
Kerrasunde (Russian Post Office);
Mount Athos (Russian Post Office);
Mytilene (Russian Post Office);
Rizeh (Russian Post Office);
Salonika (Russian Post Office);
Smyrne (Russian Post Office);
Trebizonde (Russian Post Office)

== Russian Zone (General Issues) ==
Dates
1948 – 1949
Capital
East Berlin
Currency
100 pfennige = 1 mark

Refer
Germany (Allied Occupation)

== Russkoe Obshchestvo Parokhudstva i Torgovll ==
Refer
ROPiT

== Rustenburg ==
Dates
1900 – 1902
Currency
12 pence = 1 shilling; 20 shillings = 1 pound

Refer
Transvaal

== Rwanda ==
Dates
1962 –
Capital
Kigali
Currency
100 centimes = 1 franc

Main Article Needed

See also
Ruanda-Urundi

== Ryukyu Islands ==
Dates
1948 – 1972
Capital
Naha
Currency
(1948) 100 sen = 1 yen
(1958) 100 cents = 1 dollar

Main Article Needed

== Bibliography ==
- Stanley Gibbons Ltd, Europe and Colonies 1970, Stanley Gibbons Ltd, 1969
- Stanley Gibbons Ltd, various catalogues
- Stuart Rossiter & John Flower, The Stamp Atlas, W H Smith, 1989
- XLCR Stamp Finder and Collector's Dictionary, Thomas Cliffe Ltd, c.1960
