= Compendium of postage stamp issuers (Pa–Pl) =

Photographer Journalism Student Studies At GDC Anantanag Freelance Photographer

Each "article" in this category is a collection of entries about several stamp issuers, presented in alphabetical order. The entries are formulated on the micro model and so provide summary information about all known issuers.

See the Category:Compendium of postage stamp issuers page for details of the project.

== Packhoi ==
Refer
Pakhoi (Indochinese Post Office)

== Pahang ==
Dates
1889 –
Capital
Kuantan
Currency
100 cents = 1 dollar

Main Article Needed

See also
Malaysia

== Pakhoi (Indochinese Post Office) ==
Dates
1903 – 1922
Currency
100 centimes = 1 franc

Refer
China (Indochinese Post Offices)

== Pakistan ==
Dates
1947 –
Capital
Islamabad
Currency
(1947) 12 pies = 1 anna; 16 annas = 1 rupee
(1961) 100 paisa = 1 rupee

Main Article Needed

== Palau ==
Dates
1983 –
Capital
Koror
Currency
100 cents = 1 dollar

Main Article
Postage stamps and postal history of Palau

== Palestine (British Mandate) ==
Dates
1918 – 1948
Capital
Jerusalem
Currency
(1918) 1000 millièmes = 100 piastre = 1 pound
(1927) 1000 mils = 1 pound (in parity to Pound Sterling)

Main Article
Postal history of Palestine

== Palestine (Egyptian Rule) ==
Area: Gaza Strip, during 1948 briefly also Southern parts of the West Bank.

Dates
1948 – 1967
Currency
1000 milliemes = 100 piastres = 1 pound

Refer
Egyptian Occupation Issues

See also
Gaza (Egyptian Occupation)

== Palestine (Jordanian Rule) ==
Dates
1948 – 1950
Currency
1000 mils = 1 pound

Refer
Jordan

== Palestinian Authority ==
An agreement was signed in Washington on 13 September 1993 between Israel and Yasser Arafat's PLO (Palestine Liberation Organisation) which recognised the right of Palestinian self-rule in the Gaza Strip and an enclave on the West Bank around Jericho. It was confirmed by the Cairo Agreement of 4 May 1994.

The Palestinians began issuing stamps in 1994 with the inscription The Palestinian Authority.

Dates
1994 –
Capital
Jerusalem ( claimed ) / Ramallah ( de facto )
Currency
(1994) mils
(1995) 1000 fils = 1 Jordanian dinar

Main Article
Postage stamps and postal history of the Palestinian National Authority

== Panama ==
Dates
1878 –
Capital
Panama City
Currency
(1878) 100 centavos = 1 peso
(1906) 100 centesimos = 1 balboa

Main Article Needed

== Panama Canal ==
Refer
Canal Zone

== Papal States ==
Dates
1852 – 1870
Capital
Rome
Currency
(1852) 100 bajocchi = 1 scudo
(1866) 100 centesimi = 1 lira

Refer
Italian States

== Papua ==
Dates
1906 – 1942
Capital
Port Moresby
Currency
12 pence = 1 shilling; 20 shillings = 1 pound

Refer
Papua New Guinea

== Papua New Guinea ==
Dates
1952 –
Capital
Port Moresby
Currency
(1952) 12 pence = 1 shilling; 20 shillings = 1 pound
(1966) 100 cents = 1 dollar
(1975) 100 toea = 1 kina

Main Article
Postage stamps and postal history of Papua New Guinea

Includes
British New Guinea;
New Guinea (Australian Administration);
North West Pacific Islands;
Papua

See also
German New Guinea

== Paraguay ==
Dates
1870 –
Capital
Asunción
Currency
(1870) 8 reales = 1 peso
(1878) 100 centavos = 1 peso
(1944) 100 centimos = 1 guarani

Main Article Needed

== Parma ==
Dates
1852 – 1860
Currency
100 centesimi = 1 lira

Refer
Italian States

== Patiala ==
Dates
1884 – 1947
Currency
12 pies = 1 anna; 16 annas = 1 rupee

Refer
Patiala in Indian Convention states

== Patmos (Patmo) ==
Italian colony in the Dodecanese which used the general EGEO issues and had its own stamps inscribed PATMO, the Italian name of the island.

Dates
1912 – 1932
Capital
Patmos
Currency
100 centesimi = 1 lira

Refer
Aegean Islands (Dodecanese)

== Paxos ==
Refer
Corfu & Paxos (Italian Occupation)

== Pechino (Italian Post Office) ==
Dates
1917 – 1922
Currency
Chinese and Italian both used

Refer
Italian Post Offices Abroad

== Peking (Foreign Post Offices) ==
Refer
French Post Offices Abroad;
French Post Offices Abroad;
Italian Post Offices Abroad;
Russian Post Offices Abroad

== Penang ==
Dates
1948 –
Capital
George Town
Currency
100 cents = 1 dollar

Main Article Needed

See also
Malaysia

== Penrhyn Island ==
Dates
1973 –
Capital
Currency
100 cents = 1 dollar

Main Article Needed

Includes
Penrhyn Island (New Zealand Administration)

== Penrhyn Island (New Zealand Administration) ==
Stamps of Cook Islands were used 1932–73.

Dates
1902 – 1932
Capital
Currency
12 pence = 1 shilling; 20 shillings = 1 pound

Refer
Penrhyn Island

== Perak ==
Dates
1878 –
Capital
Ipoh
Currency
100 cents = 1 dollar

Main Article Needed

See also
Malaysia

== Perlis ==
Dates
1948 –
Capital
Kangar
Currency
100 cents = 1 dollar

Main Article Needed

See also
Malaysia

== Persekutuan Tanah Melayu ==
Refer
Malayan Federation

== Persia ==
Dates
1868 – 1935
Capital
Tehran
Currency
(1868) 20 shahis = 1 kran; 10 krans = 1 toman
(1881) 100 centimes = 1 franc
(1885) 20 chahis = 1 kran; 10 krans = 1 toman
(1932) 100 dinars = 1 rial; 20 rials = 1 pahlavi

Refer
Iran

== Peru ==
Dates
1858 –
Capital
Lima
Currency
(1857) 8 reales = 1 peso
(1858) 100 centavos = 10 dineros = 5 pesetas = 1 peso
(1874) 100 centavos = 1 sol

Main Article Needed

== Peter I Island ==
Refer
Norwegian Dependency

== Philippines ==
Dates
1946 –
Capital
Manila (note: Quezon City was the capital 1948–1976)
Currency
(1946) 100 centavos = 1 peso
(1962) 100 sentimos = 1 peso

Main Article Needed

See also
Philippines (US Administration);
Spanish Philippines

== Philippines (Japanese Occupation) ==
Dates
1942 – 1945
Currency
100 centavos = 1 peso

Refer
Japanese Occupation Issues

== Philippines (US Administration) ==
Dates
1899 – 1945
Capital
Manila
Currency
(1899) 100 cents = 1 dollar
(1906) 100 centavos = 1 peso

Refer
US Post Abroad

== Piedmont ==
Piedmont is a region of NW Italy, bounded by Lombardy, France and Switzerland. Formerly part of the historic Duchy of Savoy, it was annexed by the French Republic in 1792. By the Treaty of Vienna 1815, it combined with the island of Sardinia to form a state officially known as the Kingdom of Sardinia. However, Turin was the capital and Piedmont, one of the most dynamic nations of 19th century Europe, is the name generally used by historians. The island of Sardinia was very much the junior partner. Piedmont's most prominent figure was Count Camillo Cavour (1810–61), the statesman who inspired and forged the unification of Italy under Piedmont's leadership.

Stamps were issued in Turin on 1 January 1851 but do not show the country's name. The first stamps of unified Italy, issued in 1862, were also printed in Turin.

In the catalogues, Gibbons list the Piedmont/Sardinia stamps under Sardinia. This is strictly correct but, in view of the historical prominence of Piedmont, this work follows the accepted practice of most historians. The relative insignificance of the island of Sardinia is perhaps best illustrated by the fact that Cavour, although a noted traveller, never actually visited it!

Dates
1851 – 1862
Capital
Turin
Currency
100 centesimi = 1 lira

Refer
Italian States

See also
Sardinia

== Pietersburg ==
Dates
1901 only
Currency
12 pence = 1 shilling; 20 shillings = 1 pound

Refer
Transvaal

== Pirate Coast ==
Refer
Trucial States

== Piscopi ==
Refer
Telos

== Pitcairn Islands ==
Dates
1940 –
Capital
Adamstown
Currency
(1940) 12 pence = 1 shilling; 20 shillings = 1 pound
(1968) 100 cents = 1 dollar

Main Article Needed

== Plebiscite Issues ==
Main Article Needed

Includes
Allenstein;
Carinthia;
East Silesia;
Marienwerder;
Slesvig, 1920, issued by Commission Interalliée Slesvig;
Upper Silesia

== Bibliography ==
- Stanley Gibbons Ltd, Europe and Colonies 1970, Stanley Gibbons Ltd, 1969
- Stanley Gibbons Ltd, various catalogues
- Stuart Rossiter & John Flower, The Stamp Atlas, W H Smith, 1989
- XLCR Stamp Finder and Collector's Dictionary, Thomas Cliffe Ltd, c.1960
