= Compendium of postage stamp issuers (Ca–Ce) =

Each "article" in this category is a collection of entries about several stamp issuers, presented in alphabetical order. The entries are formulated on the micro model and so provide summary information about all known issuers.

See the Category:Compendium of postage stamp issuers page for details of the project.

== Cabinda ==
Formerly Portuguese Congo, this territory had protectorate status since 1883 and was separate from Portuguese West Africa. As part of various independence movements in the 1960s a group called Front for the Liberation of the Enclave of Cabinda (FLEC) established a government-in-exile in Kinshasa. FLEC made a unilateral declaration of independence on 1 August 1975 but it was not recognised by Portugal or internationally.

In November 1975, Angolan troops of the MPLA occupied Cabinda which was annexed into the newly independent Angolan state. Angola calls the territory Cabinda Province. Since then, FLEC and other factions within Cabinda have struggled for full independence and seek to form the Republic of Cabinda.

Various organizations have issued stamps for Cabinda (widely regarded as cinderellas). These include:

- The Cabinda National Philatelic Bureau, which issued a set of eleven overprints on Angolan stamps, all with a denomination of 500 Central African francs, with designs showing fauna and mushrooms on 27 October 2006. These stamps have seen some use as paquebot mail in Barbados.
- The Federation of Free States of Africa, which issued thirty one designs showing the coat of arms and flag as well as ships, fauna, planes, natives and a map of Africa from 2010 to 2012.
- Other stamps and miniature sheets for thematic collectors appeared on eBay, Delcampe and other websites from sellers in Belarus, France, Israel and the United States.

Refer
Angola;
Portuguese Congo

== Caicos Islands ==
Separate issues by the Caicos part of the Turks and Caicos Islands, which are in the Caribbean north of Hispaniola. The Caicos are not politically independent of the Turks and there remains some controversy about the validity of the stamps, although they have been accepted for postal use.

Dates
1981 – 1985
Currency
100 cents = 1 dollar

Refer
Turks and Caicos Islands

== Calchi ==
Refer
Khalki

== Calimno ==
Refer
Kalimnos

== Calino ==
Refer
Kalimnos

== Calymnos ==
Refer
Kalimnos

== Cambodge ==
Refer
Cambodia

== Cambodia ==
Dates
1951–1975; 1980 –
Capital
Phnom Penh
Currency
(1951) 100 cents = 1 piastre
(1955) 100 cents = 1 riel

Main Article
Postage stamps and postal history of Cambodia

Includes
Kampuchea;
Khmer Republic

See also
Indochina

== Cambodia (Indochina) ==
One issue in 1936 when part of French Indochina.

Dates
1936
Currency
100 cents = 1 piastre

Refer
Indochina Territories

See also
Annam (Indochina)

== Cameroons (British Occupation) ==
British and French forces occupied the country during World War I and issue German Kamerun Yacht types with overprint of CEF and British currency value. The British section became Southern Cameroons and was administered as part of Nigeria until 1960 when it rejoined Cameroun (the former French section) after a plebiscite.

Dates
1915 only
Currency
12 pence = 1 shilling; 20 shillings = 1 pound

Refer
British Occupation Issues

See also
Southern Cameroons

== Cameroun ==
The German colony of Kamerun was occupied by French and British forces during World War I. Southern Cameroons became part of Nigeria but the remainder was administered by France until 1960 as Cameroun.

During the World War I occupation period, the French issued stamps of Gabon overprinted Corps Expeditionnaire Franco–Anglais CAMEROUN; and stamps of Middle Congo overprinted CAMEROUN Occupation Française. After the war, the Middle Congo stamps were simply overprinted CAMEROUN. The first issues specifically for Cameroun were produced in 1925. Cameroun became an independent republic in 1960 and, following a plebiscite, Southern Cameroons was reunited with it.

Dates
1915 –
Capital
Yaoundé
Currency
100 centimes = 1 franc

Main Articles
Postage stamps and postal history of Cameroon
Postage stamps and postal history of British Cameroons

See also
Kamerun

== Canada ==
Dates
1851 –
Capital
Ottawa
Currency
(1851) 12 pence = 1 shilling; 20 shillings = 1 pound
(1859) 100 cents = 1 dollar

See also
Canadian Provinces

== Canadian Provinces ==
Main article

Includes
British Columbia;
British Columbia & Vancouver Island;
New Brunswick;
New Carlisle (Gaspé);
Newfoundland;
Nova Scotia;
Prince Edward Island;
Vancouver Island

See also
Canada

== Canal Zone ==
Now uses stamps of Panama.

Dates
1904–1979
Capital
Balboa
Currency
100 cents = 1 balboa

Main article
Postage stamps and postal history of the Canal Zone

== Canary Islands ==
Overprinted airmail stamps were used during the Spanish Civil War.

Dates
1936–1938
Capital
Las Palmas
Currency
100 centimos = 1 peseta

Main article

See also
Spain

== Candia ==
Refer
Kandia

== Canea ==
Refer
Khania (Italian Post Office)

== Canouan ==
Unauthorised issues only. Canouan is one of the islands of the Grenadines of St Vincent.

Refer
Grenadines of St Vincent

== Canton (Indochinese Post Office) ==
Indochinese PO in China.

Dates
1901–1922
Currency
(1901) 100 centimes = 1 franc
(1919) 100 cents = 1 piastre

Refer
China (Indochinese Post Offices)

== Cape Colony ==
Refer
Cape of Good Hope

== Cape Juby ==
Cape Juby became part of Spanish Sahara in 1950 and is now in Morocco.

Dates
1916–1950
Currency
100 centimos = 1 peseta

Refer
Spanish West Africa

== Cape of Good Hope ==
Dates
1853–1910
Capital
Cape Town
Currency
12 pence = 1 shilling; 20 shillings = 1 pound

Main article

Includes
British Bechuanaland;
Griqualand West;
Mafeking;
Stellaland Republic;
Vryburg

== Cape Province ==
Refer
Cape of Good Hope

== Cape Verde Islands ==
Dates
1877 –
Capital
Praia
Currency
100 centavos = 1 escudo

Main article needed
Postage stamps and postal history of Cape Verde

See also
Africa (Portuguese Colonies)

== Carchi ==
Refer
Khalki

== Caribbean Netherlands ==
Dates
2010-
Currency
100 cents = 1 gulden (florin) (until 1-1-2011)
100 cents = 1 dollar (from 1-1-2011)

Issuing authority is the Netherlands

See also
Curaçao (Curaçao and Dependencies);
Netherlands Antilles;
Netherlands;

== Carinthia ==
Austrian and Yugoslav overprints used during a plebiscite. Carinthia remained in Austria.

Dates
1920 only
Currency
100 heller = 1 krone (Austrian series);
100 paras = 1 dinar (Yugoslav series)

Refer
Plebiscite Issues

== Carnaro Regency ==
Refer
Arbe;
Fiume;
Veglia

== Caroline Islands (Karolinen) ==
A group of islands in the western South Pacific of which the main ones are Palau, Yap, Truk, Ponape and Kosrae. They were a Spanish colony from 1885 but there was no postal service as such until 1899 when the islands were purchased by Germany as the protectorate of Karolinen.

Karolinen was administered from Rabaul in German New Guinea. Issues of standard German Colonies types were inscribed KAROLINEN. These were in use 1899–1914. On the outbreak of World War I in 1914, the islands were seized by Japan which retained control until driven out by American forces in WW2. American occupation continued after WW2 and the islands became a UN Trust Territory under USA administration 1947–83. Palau became independent in 1981; the remainder became Federated States of Micronesia in 1983.

Used stamps of Japan 1914–46; used stamps of USA 1946–83.

Dates
1899–1914
Capital
Truk
Currency
100 pfennige = 1 mark

Refer
German Colonies

See also
Micronesia;
Palau

== Carpathos ==
Refer
Karpathos

== Caso/Casos ==
Refer
Kasos

== Castelrosso (Kastellórizo) ==
Formerly a Turkish island, Castelrosso (Kastellórizo) was occupied by France 1915–20 and then became one of Italy's Dodecanese colonies. Used own stamps and the general EGEO issues. Part of Greece since 1947 and now called Kastellórizo, which is also the name of the only village.

Dates
1920–1932
Capital
Kastellórizo
Currency
100 centesimi = 1 lira

Refer
Aegean Islands (Dodecanese)

See also
French Occupation Issues

== Castelrosso (French Occupation) ==
Former Turkish island occupied by the French navy in 1915. It was awarded to Italy as part of the Dodecanese in 1921 and, like the rest, was unified with Greece in 1947. It is now called Kastellórizo.

During the French occupation, stamps of France and French Levant were issued with overprints such as ONF CASTELLORIZO.

Dates
1920–1921
Currency
French (100 centimes = 1 franc)
used concurrently with Turkish (40 paras = 1 piastre)

Refer
French Occupation Issues

See also
Aegean Islands (Dodecanese);
Castelrosso (Kastellórizo)

== Castelrosso (Italian Occupation) ==
Refer
Castelrosso (Kastellórizo)

== Cauca ==
Dates
1886 only
Currency
100 centavos = 1 peso

Refer
Colombian Territories

== Cavalla/Cavalle ==
Refer
Kavalla (French Post Office)

== Cayes of Belize ==
Unofficial issues only.

Refer
Belize

== Cayman Islands ==
Dates
1900 –
Capital
George Town
Currency
(1900) 12 pence = 1 shilling; 20 shillings = 1 pound
(1969) 100 cents = 1 dollar

Main Article
Postage stamps and postal history of the Cayman Islands

== CEF ==
These initials have been used in two entirely separate spheres. They refer to the international China Expeditionary Force sent to China in 1900; also to the British forces which occupied German Kamerun in 1915 (i.e., Cameroons Expeditionary Force).

Refer
Cameroons (British Occupation);
China Expeditionary Force

== Bibliography ==
- Stanley Gibbons Ltd, Europe and Colonies 1970, Stanley Gibbons Ltd, 1969
- Stanley Gibbons Ltd, various catalogues
- Stuart Rossiter & John Flower, The Stamp Atlas, W H Smith, 1989
- XLCR Stamp Finder and Collector's Dictionary, Thomas Cliffe Ltd, c.1960
