= Compendium of postage stamp issuers (Io–Iz) =

Each "article" in this category is a collection of entries about several stamp issuers, presented in alphabetical order. The entries are formulated on the micro model and so provide summary information about all known issuers.

See the Category:Compendium of postage stamp issuers page for details of the project.

== Ionian Islands ==
Dates
1859 – 1864
Capital
Argostolion (Cephalonia)
Currency
12 pence = 1 shilling; 20 shillings = 1 pound

Main Article Needed

See also
Cephalonia and Ithaca (Italian Occupation);
Corfu (Italian Occupation);
Corfu & Paxos (Italian Occupation);
Ionian Islands (Italian Occupation);
Zante (German Occupation)

== Ionian Islands (German Occupation) ==
Refer
Zante (German Occupation)

== Ionian Islands (Italian Occupation) ==
Dates
1941 – 1943

Refer
Italian Occupation Issues

See also
Cephalonia and Ithaca (Italian Occupation);
Corfu (Italian Occupation);
Corfu & Paxos (Italian Occupation);
Zante (German Occupation)

== Iran ==
Dates
1935 –
Capital
Tehran
Currency
(1868) 20 shahis = 1 kran; 10 krans = 1 toman
(1881) 100 centimes = 1 franc
(1885) 20 chahis = 1 kran; 10 krans = 1 toman
(1932) 100 dinars = 1 rial; 20 rials = 1 pahlavi

Main Article
Postage stamps and postal history of Iran

Includes
Persia

== Iraq ==
Dates
1923 –
Capital
Baghdad
Currency
(1923) 16 annas = 1 rupee
(1931) 1000 fils = 1 dinar

== Iraq (British Occupation) ==
Dates
1918 – 1923
Currency
16 annas = 1 rupee

Refer
British Occupation Issues

== Ireland ==
Refer
Northern Ireland;
Republic of Ireland

== Irian Barat ==
Refer
West Irian

== Island ==
Refer
Iceland

== Isle of Man ==
Isle of Man Post

Dates
1973 –
Capital
Douglas
Currency
100 pence = 1 pound

Main Article
Postage stamps and postal history of the Isle of Man

See also
Great Britain (Regional Issues)

== Isole Italiane dell' Egeo ==
Refer
Aegean Islands (Dodecanese)

== Isole Jonie ==
Refer
Ionian Islands (Italian Occupation)

== Israel ==
Dates
1948 –
Capital
Jerusalem (claimed)
Currency
(1948) 1000 prutot (mils) = 1 Israeli pound
(1960) 100 agorot = 1 pound
(1980) 100 agorot = 1 shekel

Main Article
Postage stamps and postal history of Israel

== Istria ==
Refer
Venezia Giulia & Istria

== Istria (Yugoslav Occupation) ==
Dates
1945 only
Currency
100 centesimi = 1 lira

Refer
Venezia Giulia & Istria

== ITA-Karjala ==
Refer
Eastern Karelia (Finnish Occupation)

== Italian Austria ==
Refer
Dalmatia (Italian Occupation);
Trentino (Italian Occupation);
Venezia Giulia (Italian Occupation)

== Italian Colonies (General Issues) ==
Dates
1932 – 1934
Currency
100 centesimi = 1 lira

Main Article Needed

== Italian Colonies (British Occupation) ==
Refer
BA/BMA Issues;
Cyrenaica (British Occupation);
Dodecanese Islands (British Occupation);
East Africa Forces;
Eritrea (British Occupation);
Middle East Forces (MEF);
Somalia (British Occupation);
Tripolitania (British Occupation)

== Italian East Africa ==
Dates
1936 – 1941
Capital
Addis Ababa
Currency
100 centesimi= 1 lira

Main Article
Postage stamps and postal history of Italian East Africa

== Italian Levant ==
Refer
Italian Post Offices in the Turkish Empire

== Italian Occupation Issues ==
Main Article Needed

Includes
Albania (Italian Occupation);
Cephalonia and Ithaca (Italian Occupation);
Corfu (Italian Occupation);
Corfu & Paxos (Italian Occupation);
Dalmatia (Italian Occupation);
Ethiopia (Italian Occupation);
Fiume & Kupa Zone (Italian Occupation);
Ionian Islands (Italian Occupation);
Lubiana (Italian Occupation);
Montenegro (Italian Occupation);
Saseno (Italian Occupation);
Trentino (Italian Occupation);
Venezia Giulia (Italian Occupation)

See also
Castelrosso (Kastellorizon)

== Italian Post Offices Abroad ==
Main Article Needed

Includes
Alexandria (Italian Post Office);
Crete (Italian Post Offices);
Khania (Italian Post Office);
Pechino (Italian Post Office);
Tientsin (Italian Post Office)

See also
Italian Post Offices in the Turkish Empire

== Italian Post Offices in the Turkish Empire ==
Dates
1873 – 1923
Currency
(1873) 40 paras = 1 piastre
(1908) 100 centesimi = 1 lira

Main Article Needed

Includes
Benghazi (Italian Post Office);
Constantinople (Italian Post Office);
Durazzo (Italian Post Office);
Jannina (Italian Post Office);
Jerusalem (Italian Post Office);
Salonika (Italian Post Office);
Scutari (Italian Post Office);
Smirne (Italian Post Office);
Tripoli (Italian Post Office);
Valona (Italian Post Office)

== Italian Social Republic ==
Dates
1944 – 1945
Capital
Salò (Lake Garda)
Currency
100 centesimi = 1 lira

Refer
Italy

== Italian Somaliland ==
Dates
1905 – 1936
Capital
Mogadishu
Currency
100 centesimi = 1 lira

Main Article Needed

Includes
Benadir

See also
British Occupation Issues;
Italian East Africa;
Jubaland;
Somalia

== Italian States ==
Main Article Needed

Includes
Modena;
Naples;
Neapolitan Provinces;
Papal States;
Parma;
Piedmont;
Romagna;
Sicily;
Tuscany

See also
Sardinia

== Italy ==
Dates
1862 –
Capital
Rome
Currency
(1862) 100 centesimi = 1 lira
(2002) 100 cent = 1 euro

Includes
Italian Social Republic

== Italy (Austrian Occupation) ==
Dates
1918 only
Currency
100 centesimi = 1 lira

Refer
Austro-Hungarian Military Post

== Ithaca (Italian Occupation) ==
Refer
Cephalonia and Ithaca (Italian Occupation)

== Ivory Coast ==
Dates
1959 –
Capital
Abidjan
Currency
100 centimes = 1 franc

Main Article
Postage stamps and postal history of Ivory Coast

Includes
Ivory Coast (French Colony)

See also
French West Africa

== Ivory Coast (French Colony) ==
Dates
1892 – 1944
Capital
Abidjan
Currency
100 centimes = 1 franc

Refer
Ivory Coast

== Bibliography ==
- Stanley Gibbons Ltd, Europe and Colonies 1970, Stanley Gibbons Ltd, 1969
- Stanley Gibbons Ltd, various catalogues
- Stuart Rossiter & John Flower, The Stamp Atlas, W H Smith, 1989
- XLCR Stamp Finder and Collector's Dictionary, Thomas Cliffe Ltd, c.1960
