= Compendium of postage stamp issuers (Gh–Gz) =

Each "article" in this category is a collection of entries about many stamp issuers, presented in alphabetical order. The entries are formulated on the micro model and so provide summary information about all known issuers.

See the Category:Compendium of postage stamp issuers page for details of the project.

== Ghadames ==
Dates
1949 – 1951
Capital
Ghadames
Currency
French (100 centimes = 1 franc)

Refer
Fezzan

== Ghana ==
Dates
1957 –
Capital
Accra
Currency
(1957) 12 pence = 1 shilling; 20 shillings = 1 pound
(1965) 100 pesewas = 1 cedi

Main Article
Postage stamps and postal history of Ghana

See also
Gold Coast

== Gibraltar ==
Dates
1886 –
Capital
Gibraltar
Currency
(1886) 12 pence = 1 shilling; 20 shillings = 1 pound
(1971) 100 pence = 1 pound

Main Article
Postage stamps and postal history of Gibraltar

== Gilbert Islands ==
Dates
1976 – 1979
Capital
Tarawa
Currency
100 cents = 1 dollar

Refer
Kiribati

== Gilbert & Ellice Islands ==
Dates
1911 – 1975
Capital
Tarawa
Currency
(1911) 12 pence = 1 shilling; 20 shillings = 1 pound
(1966) 100 cents = 1 dollar

Main Article
Postage stamps and postal history of the Gilbert and Ellice Islands

See also
Kiribati;
Tuvalu

== Goa ==
Refer
Portuguese India

== Gold Coast ==
Dates
1875 – 1957
Capital
Accra
Currency
12 pence = 1 shilling; 20 shillings = 1 pound

Main Article

See also
Ghana

== Gorizia ==
Refer
Venezia Giulia & Istria

== Graham Land (Falkland Island Dependencies) ==
Dates
1944 – 1946
Currency
12 pence = 1 shilling; 20 shillings = 1 pound

Refer
Falkland Islands Dependencies

== Granadine Confederation ==
Dates
1859 – 1861
Capital
Bogotá
Currency
100 centavos = 1 peso

Refer
Colombian Territories

== Grand Liban ==
Refer
Lebanon

== Grande Comore ==
Refer
Great Comoro

== Great Britain ==
Dates
1840 –
Capital
London
Currency
(1840) 12 pence = 1 shilling; 20 shillings = 1 pound
(1971) 100 pence = 1 pound

== Great Britain (Regional Issues) ==
Dates
1958 –
Currency
(1958) 12 pence = 1 shilling; 20 shillings = 1 pound
(1971) 100 pence = 1 pound

Includes
Northern Ireland;
Scotland;
Wales

See also
Channel Islands;
Guernsey;
Isle of Man;
Jersey

== Great Comoro ==
Dates
1897 – 1914
Capital
Moroni
Currency
100 centimes = 1 franc

Refer
Madagascar & Dependencies

See also
Comoro Islands

== Greater Lebanon ==
Dates
1924 – 1926
Capital
Beirut
Currency
100 centimes = 1 piastre

Refer
Lebanon

== Greece ==
Dates
1861 –
Capital
Athens
Currency
(1861) 100 lepta = 1 drachma
(2002) 100 cent = 1 euro

Includes
Greek Post Offices in the Turkish Empire

== Greek Occupation Issues ==
Main Article

Includes
Albania (Greek Occupation);
Dodecanese Islands (Greek Occupation);
Kavalla (Greek Occupation);
Khios;
Lemnos;
Lesbos

See also
Adrianople;
Aegean Islands (Dodecanese);
Dedêagatz (Greek Occupation);
Eastern Thrace;
Epirus;
Gumultsina;
Ikaria;
Thrace;
Western Thrace;
Western Thrace (Greek Occupation)

== Greek Post Offices in the Turkish Empire ==
Dates
1861 – 1881
Currency
100 lepta = 1 drachma

Refer
Greece

== Greenland ==
Dates
1938 –
Capital
Nuuk
Currency
100 ore = 1 krone

Main Article
Postage stamps and postal history of Greenland

== Grenada ==
Dates
1861 –
Capital
St George's
Currency
(1861) 12 pence = 1 shilling; 20 shillings = 1 pound
(1949) 100 cents = 1 dollar

Main Article Postage stamps and postal history of Grenada

== Grenadines of Grenada ==
Dates
1973 –
Capital
Hillsborough
Currency
100 cents = 1 dollar

Main Article

== Grenadines of St Vincent ==
Dates
1973 –
Capital
Port Elizabeth
Currency
100 cents = 1 dollar

Main Article

== Griqualand West ==
Dates
1874 – 1880
Capital
Kimberley
Currency
12 pence = 1 shilling; 20 shillings = 1 pound

Refer
Cape of Good Hope

== Grodno ==
Refer
South Lithuania (Russian Occupation)

== Guadeloupe ==
Dates
1884 – 1947
Capital
Basse-Terre
Currency
100 centimes = 1 franc

Main Article
Postage stamps and postal history of Guadeloupe

== Guam ==
Dates
1899 – 1901
Capital
Agaña
Currency
100 cents = 1 dollar

Refer
US Post Abroad

== Guanacaste ==
Dates
1885 – 1889
Currency
100 centavos = 1 peso

Main Article

See also
Costa Rica

== Guatemala ==
Dates
1871 –
Capital
Guatemala City
Currency
(1871) 100 centavos = 8 reales = 1 peso
(1927) 100 centavos = 1 quetzal

Main Article
Postage stamps and postal history of Guatemala

== Guernsey ==
Dates
1941 –
Capital
St Peter Port
Currency
(1941) 12 pence = 1 shilling; 20 shillings = 1 pound
(1971) 100 pence = 1 pound

Main Article
Postage stamps and postal history of Guernsey

See also
Alderney;
Channel Islands;
Great Britain (Regional Issues)

== Guinea ==
Dates
1959 –
Capital
Conakry
Currency
(1959) 100 centimes = 1 franc
(1973) 100 caury = 1 syli

Main Article
Postage stamps and postal history of Guinea

See also
French Guinea;
French West Africa

== Guinea-Bissau ==
Dates
1974 –
Capital
Bissau
Currency
(1974) 100 centavos = 1 escudo
(1976) 100 cents = 1 peso

Main Article
Postage stamps and postal history of Guinea-Bissau

See also
Portuguese Guinea

== Gulf of Kotor ==
Refer
Dalmatia (German Occupation)

== Gumultsina ==
Dates
1913 only
Currency
100 lepta = 1 drachma

Refer
Thrace

See also
Dedêagatz (Greek Occupation);
Thrace (Allied Occupation);
Western Thrace

== Guyana ==
Dates
1966 –
Capital
Georgetown
Currency
100 cents = 1 dollar

Main Article
Postage stamps and postal history of Guyana

See also
British Guiana

== Gwalior ==
Dates
1885 – 1948
Capital
Gwalior
Currency
12 pies = 1 anna; 16 annas = 1 rupee

Refer
Gwalior in Indian Convention states

== Bibliography ==
- Stanley Gibbons Ltd, Europe and Colonies 1970, Stanley Gibbons Ltd, 1969
- Stanley Gibbons Ltd, various catalogues
- Stuart Rossiter & John Flower, The Stamp Atlas, W H Smith, 1989
- XLCR Stamp Finder and Collector's Dictionary, Thomas Cliffe Ltd, c.1960
