= Compendium of postage stamp issuers (Ci–Co) =

Each "article" in this category is a collection of entries about several stamp issuers, presented in alphabetical order. The entries are formulated on the micro model and so provide summary information about all known issuers.

See the Category:Compendium of postage stamp issuers page for details of the project.

== Cilicia (French Occupation) ==
French occupation issues of Turkish stamps with various overprints which all included CILICIE.

Dates
1918–1921
Capital
Adana
Currency
40 paras = 1 piastre

Refer
French Occupation Issues

== CIS ==
Refer
Union of Soviet Socialist Republics (USSR)

== Ciskei ==
One of the territories ( Bantustans ) set up by the South African government as part of its apartheid policy. Although the territory itself did not acquire international recognition, its stamps were valid for postage.

Dates
1981 – 1994
Capital
Bhisho
Currency
100 cents = 1 rand

Refer
South African Territories

== Cochin ==
Cochin was a state of South India which merged with Travancore on 1 July 1949 to form Travancore–Cochin. This in turn became the state of Kerala in 1956.

Dates
1892–1949
Capital
Ernakulam
Currency
(1892) 6 puttans = 5 annas
(1898) 12 pies = 1 anna; 16 annas = 1 rupee

Refer
Indian Native States

See also
Travancore–Cochin

== Cochin-China ==
Stamps of France were introduced in 1862 when the region became a French colony. On 17 October 1887, Cochin-China united with Cambodia, Annam and Tongking to form Indo-China. Stamps of Indo-China were introduced in January 1889. There were five Cochin-China stamps. All were surcharged French Colonies Commerce types. One (SG#3) was distinctive by an overprint of C.CH. Cochin-China is now the southern part of Vietnam.

Dates
1886–1889
Capital
Saigon
Currency
100 centimes = 1 franc
Main article
Postage stamps and postal history of Cochin-China
See also
Annam & Tongking;
Indo-China Territories

== Cocos (Keeling) Islands ==
Discovered by Captain William Keeling in 1609, the islands were uninhabited until 1826. They were annexed by Britain in 1857. Administration was mainly by Singapore until 1955 when the islands were transferred to Australia as a Dependent Territory.

Australian stamps were used 1955–1963 and again from 14 February 1966 to 8 July 1969 due to the introduction of decimal currency.

Dates
1963 –
Capital
West Island
Currency
(1963) 12 pence = 1 shilling; 20 shillings = 1 pound
(1969) 100 cents = 1 dollar

Main Article
Postage stamps and postal history of the Cocos (Keeling) Islands

== Coetivy ==
Coëtivy Island is in the Indian Ocean south of the main Seychelles group. A post office was opened there in 1963. It was administered by Britain as part of the Seychelles until 8 November 1965 when it was included in British Indian Ocean Territory. From 1976, Coetivy has been in the independent Seychelles and uses stamps of Zil Elwannyen Sesel.

Refer
Zil Elwannyen Sesel

== Colombia ==
Dates
1859 –
Capital
Bogotá
Currency
100 centavos = 1 peso

Main Article
Postage stamps and postal history of Colombia

== Colombian Territories ==
Main Article

Includes
Antioquia;
AVIANCA;
Bolívar;
Boyacá;
Cauca;
Cundinamarca;
Granadine Confederation;
LANSA;
New Granada;
Santander;
Tolima

== Commonwealth of Independent States (CIS) ==
The CIS was founded in December 1991 at a meeting in Minsk of Russia, Belarus and Ukraine. It was intended to be a commonwealth of Slav republics to ensure co-operation in defence, economics and foreign policy. It was subsequently joined by all the other former Soviet states except Georgia and the three Baltic republics.

Stamps of the USSR continued to be used in the member states until each could introduce new types. There have been no issues for the CIS as a whole.

Refer
Union of Soviet Socialist Republics (USSR)

== Comoro Islands ==
An archipelago in the Indian Ocean, north west of Madagascar. The four main islands are Anjouan, Grande Comore (Great Comoro), Mayotte and Moheli. Mayotte is politically a French overseas department, while the others constitute the Comoros Republic.

The whole group came under French protection after 1841 and were separate colonies during 1891–1914. In this period, each island issued French Colonial Tablet types inscribed with the island's name. On 23 February 1914, they were attached to Madagascar as dependencies. British forces captured the islands from Vichy control in 1942 and, on 9 May 1946, they became collectively a French overseas department called ARCHIPEL DES COMORES.

Stamps of Madagascar & Dependencies were used 1914–1950. The first Comoros issue was on 15 May 1950.

Independence was declared on 6 July 1975 as the Comoros Republic, but this move was resisted in Mayotte which continued to be part of France and now uses stamps of France. Mayotte has a predominantly Catholic population whereas the other three islands are mainly Muslim.

Dates
1950 –
Capital
Moroni (Grande Comore)
Currency
100 centimes = 1 franc

Main Article
Postage stamps and postal history of the Comoros

== Companhia do Nyassa ==
Refer
Nyassa

== Confederate States of America ==
The Confederacy was established by the southern U.S. states in February 1861 when they seceded from the Union. This precipitated the American Civil War which ended 9 April 1865 with the surrender of Robert E. Lee's army to that of Ulysses S. Grant.

The first Confederacy stamps were issued 18 October 1861. There were four issues in all with values ranging from 2 to 20 cents. All the stamps were definitive types with portraits of Jefferson Davis (Confederacy president) or of former Union presidents such as Washington, Jefferson, and Jackson.

Dates
1861 – 1865
Capital
Richmond (Virginia)
Currency
100 cents = 1 dollar

See also
United States of America (USA)

== Congo (Indian UN Force) ==
Stamps were issued to Indian military personnel with the United Nations force in the Congo. These were six values of the familiar Indian map type overprinted UN FORCE (INDIA) CONGO.

Dates
1962 only
Currency
100 naye paise = 1 rupee

Refer
Indian Overseas Forces

== Congo Free State ==
A vast country in central Africa which was not fully explored by Europeans until the 1870s. The missions, including those of Stanley and Livingstone, were partly financed by King Leopold II of Belgium who established the Congo Free State under his personal rule on 2 May 1885.

Stamps were issued from 1 January 1886 inscribed ETAT INDEPENDENT DU CONGO.

On 18 October 1908, the Congo was annexed by an Act of the Belgian parliament and renamed Belgian Congo (Congo Belge). The first stamps with this inscription were issued on 1 January 1909. In the meantime, stocks of Congo Free State stamps were overprinted CONGO BELGE.

Dates
1886–1908
Capital
Leopoldville
Currency
100 centimes = 1 franc

Main Article

See also
Belgian Congo

== Congo Republic ==
Formerly Middle Congo.

Dates
1959 –
Capital
Brazzaville
Currency
100 centimes = 1 franc

Main Article
Postage stamps and postal history of the Republic of the Congo

See also
French Congo;
French Equatorial Africa;
Middle Congo

== Congo Republic (Zaire) ==
Formerly Belgian Congo and Zaire.

Dates
1960–1971
Capital
Kinshasa
Currency
(1960) 100 centimes = 1 franc
(1967) 100 sengi = 1 kuta; 100 kuta = 1 zaire

Refer
Zaire

== Constantinople ==
A number of foreign post offices were established in Constantinople. Most issued stamps of the home country or general Levant types of that country. There were overprinted local issues by the Italian, Polish, Romanian and Russian offices.

Refer
Constantinople (Italian Post Office);
Constantinople (Polish Post Office);
Constantinople (Romanian Post Office);
Constantinople (Russian Post Office)

== Constantinople (Italian Post Office) ==
Dates
1908–1923
Currency
40 paras = 1 piastre

Refer
Italian Post Offices in the Turkish Empire

== Constantinople (Polish Post Office) ==
Dates
1919–1921
Currency
100 fenigi = 1 mark

Refer
Polish Post Abroad

== Constantinople (Romanian Post Office) ==
Dates
1896–1919
Currency
40 paras = 1 piastre

Refer
Romanian Post Abroad

== Constantinople (Russian Post Office) ==
The office was open 1863–1918 and normally used stamps of Russia or Russian Levant. There was an individual overprint for Galata PO in Constantinople in 1909–10.

Dates
1909–1910
Currency
40 paras = 1 piastre

Refer
Russian Post Offices in the Turkish Empire

== Coo ==
Refer
Kos

== Cook Islands ==
Dates
1892 –
Capital
Avarua
Currency
(1892) 12 pence = 1 shilling; 20 shillings = 1 pound
(1967) 100 cents = 1 dollar

Main Article
Postage stamps and postal history of the Cook Islands

Includes
Rarotonga

== Córdoba ==
Dates
1858 only
Currency
100 centavos = 1 peso fuerte

Refer
Argentine Territories

== Corfu (Italian Occupation) ==
Italian occupation during brief dispute with Greece. Italian stamps overprinted CORFU were prepared but only a few had been introduced when evacuation took place.

Dates
1923 only
Currency
100 centesimi = 1 lira

Refer
Italian Occupation Issues

See also
Ionian Islands (Italian Occupation)

== Corfu & Paxos (Italian Occupation) ==
Italian occupation forces issued Greek stamps overprinted CORFU. These were replaced by a general issue for the whole of the Ionian Islands.

Dates
1941 only
Currency
100 lepta = 1 drachma (Greek)

Refer
Italian Occupation Issues

See also
Ionian Islands (Italian Occupation)

== Bibliography ==
- Stanley Gibbons Ltd, Europe and Colonies 1970, Stanley Gibbons Ltd, 1969
- Stanley Gibbons Ltd, various catalogues
- Stuart Rossiter & John Flower, The Stamp Atlas, W H Smith, 1989
- XLCR Stamp Finder and Collector's Dictionary, Thomas Cliffe Ltd, c.1960
