= Compendium of postage stamp issuers (Co–Cz) =

Each "article" in this category is a collection of entries about several stamp issuers, presented in alphabetical order. The entries are formulated on the micro model and so provide summary information about all known issuers.

See the Category:Compendium of postage stamp issuers page for details of the project.

== Corrientes ==
Dates
1856 – 1878
Currency
100 centavos = 1 peso fuerte

Refer
Argentine Territories

== Corsica ==
Large island in the western Mediterranean, north of Sardinia. First civilisation was established by Ionians from Phocaea about 560 BC. Invaded by various peoples until annexed by Genoa in the 14th century. Due to constant rebellions, Genoa sold the island to France in 1768. The following year, Napoleon Bonaparte was born in Ajaccio and it was under his rule that Corsica finally accepted French nationality. Corsica is now a French département. It has used stamps of France only.

Capital
Ajaccio

Refer
France

== Cos ==
Refer
Kos

== Costa Rica ==
Dates
1863 –
Capital
San José
Currency
(1863) 8 reales = 1 peso
(1881) 100 centavos = 1 peso
(1901) 100 centavos = 1 colon

Main Article
Postage stamps and postal history of Costa Rica

See also
Guanacaste

== Council of Europe (Strasbourg) ==
Dates
1950 –
Currency
100 centimes = 1 franc

Refer
International Organisations

== CPR Regional Issues ==
Main Article

Includes
Central China (People's Post);
East China (People's Post);
North China (People's Post);
North East China (People's Post);
North West China (People's Post);
Port Arthur & Dairen;
Shensi-Kansu-Ninghsia;
South China (People's Post);
South West China (People's Post)

See also
Chinese People's Republic

== Cretan Revolutionary Assembly ==
Stamps were issued by a rebel group led by Venizelos and based at Theriso, south of Khania. The rebels demanded union with Greece. The revolt began in March and collapsed in Nov 1905.

Dates
1905 only
Capital
Theriso
Currency
100 lepta = 1 drachma (Greek)

Refer
Crete

== Crete ==
Crete was under Venetian rule to 1669 when it was conquered by the Ottoman Turks. A long civil war developed after 1840 which was only ended by a multi-power occupation (Britain, France, Italy and Russia) in 1898. The island was declared an autonomous state in 1899 and was united with Greece by the Treaty of London 1913.

Cretan stamps were overprinted HELLAS in 1908–09 during a premature attempt by the local parliament to declare union with Greece. Greek stamps were imported in 1912 and were already in common use when union was finally confirmed.

Dates
1900 – 1913
Capital
Kandia (now Herakleion)
Currency
100 lepta = 1 drachma

Main Article
Postage stamps and postal history of Crete

Includes
Cretan Revolutionary Assembly

== Crete (Austro-Hungarian Post Offices) ==
Overprinted Austrian stamps were in use at offices in Kandia, Khania and Rethymnon. These offices all closed on 15 December 1914.

Dates
1903 – 1914
Currency
100 centimes = 1 franc

Main Article

See also: Austro–Hungarian Post Offices in the Turkish Empire

== Crete (British Post Offices) ==
Stamps inscribed in Greek were used in the British sphere of administration (Kandia) during the multi-power occupation. Mail was forwarded via the Austrian office at Khania and surviving envelopes bear the stamps of both the British and Austrian agencies. It is therefore uncertain if the British stamps had international validity.

Dates
1898 – 1899
Currency
40 paras = 1 piastre (Turkish)

Refer
British Post Offices Abroad

== Crete (Foreign Post Offices) ==
Refer
Crete (Austro–Hungarian Post Offices);
Crete (British Post Offices);
Crete (French Post Offices);
Crete (Italian Post Offices);
Crete (Russian Post Offices)

== Crete (French Post Offices) ==
France was one of the multi-power occupiers which ended the Cretan civil war in 1898–99. They established postal services in offices at Kandia, Khania, Hierapetra, Rethymnon and Sitea. Standard French types were issued with an inscription of CRETE. All offices were closed in 1913.

Dates
1902 – 1913
Currency
(1902) 100 centimes = 1 franc
(1903) 40 paras = 1 piastre

Main Article

== Crete (Italian Post Offices) ==
Refer
Khania (Italian Post Office)

== Crete (Russian Post Offices) ==
Russia was one of the powers which occupied Crete in 1898. It had a post office at Rethymnon within its own sphere of administration. The service operated for a short time only: from 13 May 1899 to 29 July 1899. Four types were issued inscribed RETHYMNO with a total of 37 stamps.

Dates
1899 only
Currency
4 metallik = 1 grosion

Refer
Russian Post Offices Abroad

== Crimea ==
Regional government issues.

Dates
1918 – 1919
Capital
Simferopol
Currency
100 kopecks = 1 Russian ruble

Refer
Russian Civil War Issues

== Croatia ==
Following the collapse of communism, Croatia declared its independence from Yugoslavia on 30 May 1991. Serb inhabitants revolted with the backing of the Yugoslav army and fought a bitter aggressive war against the Croatia. In January 1992, a ceasefire became effective after the intervention of the UN and the EEC.

In 1995, the Republic of Croatia began to recover its occupied territories. The army liberated Western Slavonia in May and areas of Banovina, Kordun, Lika and Dalmatia in August. Both areas were reincorporated into the republic. Eastern Slavonia was placed under UN administration in November and called Sremsko Baranjska Oblast (Srem and Baranya Region). The administration lasted two years before Eastern Slavonia as a whole was reincorporated back into the Republic of Croatia on 15 January 1998.

The Republic of Croatia began stamp issues after independence with the inscription REPUBLIKA HRVATSKA.

Dates
1991 –
Capital
Zagreb
Currency
(1991) 100 paras = 1 dinar
(1994) 100 lipa = 1 kuna

Main Article
Postage stamps and postal history of Croatia

Includes
Croatia (Provincial Issues);
Croatia (Semi–Autonomous State);
Croatia (Yugoslav Regional Issue);
Sremsko Baranjska Oblast (Croatia);
Srpska Krajina (Croatia)

See also
Yugoslavia

== Croatia (Provincial Issues) ==
Provincial issues were in use during 1918–21 prior to Croatia joining the Kingdom of Serbs Croats & Slovenes, which became Yugoslavia in 1929.

Dates
1918 – 1921
Currency
(1918) 100 filler = 1 korona
(1919) 100 heller = 1 krona

Refer
Croatia

== Croatia (Semi–Autonomous State) ==
After the German conquest of Yugoslavia in 1941, Croatia was a semi-autonomous state with a puppet government set up by the Nazis. Croatia returned to Yugoslavia after WW2.

Dates
1941 – 1945
Capital
Zagreb
Currency
(April 1941) 100 paras = 1 dinar
(Sept 1941) 100 banicas = 1 kuna

Refer
Croatia

== Croatia (Yugoslav Regional Issue) ==
Croatia returned to Yugoslavia after WW2 but there was another regional issue in 1945 due to a shortage of Yugoslavia stamps at the time.

Dates
1945 only
Capital
Zagreb
Currency
100 banicas = 1 kuna

Refer
Croatia

== Croatian Posts (Bosnia) ==
When the Republic of Bosnia and Herzegovina was proclaimed from Sarajevo in March 1992, a civil war situation escalated with Bosnian Serbs attempting to seize control of the country.

An immediate effect of the conflict was that the country split into three entities: Republika Srpska (Bosnian Serb Republic), based at Pale, which declared allegiance to Serb-dominated Yugoslavia; the Moslem-dominated "central government" based in Sarajevo; and a Croat administration based at Mostar.

The Mostar regime issued stamps inscribed BOSNA I HERCEGOVINA for four years. Some issues referred to Croatia itself.

When the Dayton Agreement was finalised in November 1995, the Mostar regime amalgamated with the Sarajevo government to form the Federation of Bosnia and Herzegovina, while the Bosnian Serb Republic remained separate. Combined issues inscribed BOSNA I HERCEGOVINA have been issued since 1996. In 1997, the currency changed to 100 fennig = 1 mark.

Dates
1992 – 1996
Capital
Mostar
Currency
(1992) 100 paras = 1 dinar
(1994) 100 lipa = 1 kuna

Refer
Bosnia & Herzegovina

== Crozet ==
Refer
French Southern & Antarctic Territories

== Cuba ==
Cuba and Puerto Rico had joint issues 1855–72 when both were under Spanish colonial rule. Cuba, though still a colony, had its own stamps 1873–99. In 1899, colonial rule was ended and the island was under USA administration 1899–1902, but continued to issue its own stamps. Cuba became independent in 1902.

Dates
1873 –
Capital
Havana
Currency
(1873) 100 centimos = 1 peseta
(1881) 100 centavos = 1 peso
(1898) 100 cents = 1 dollar (USA)
(1899) 100 centavos = 1 peso

Main Article
Postage stamps and postal history of Cuba

See also
Cuba & Puerto Rico

== Cuba & Puerto Rico ==
Joint issues when both islands were under Spanish colonial rule.

Dates
1855 – 1872
Currency
(1855) 8.5 cuartos = 1 Spanish real
(1866) 100 centimos = 1 peseta

See also
Cuba;
Puerto Rico

== Cundinamarca ==
Dates
1870 – 1904
Currency
100 centavos = 1 peso

Refer
Colombian Territories

== Curaçao (Curaçao and Dependencies) ==
Issued for the islands Aruba, Curaçao, Sint Maarten (which are now stamp issuers themselves) as well as Bonaire, Saba and Sint Eustatius (stamp issuer is the Netherlands as "Caribbean Netherlands"). After the name change in 1948, stamps have been inscribed Netherlands Antilles.

Dates
1873 – 1948
Capital
Willemstad
Currency
100 cents = 1 gulden

Main Article

See also
Netherlands Antilles

== Curaçao (island country) ==
Since 1948, stamps have been inscribed Netherlands Antilles.

Dates
1873 – 1948
Capital
Willemstad
Currency
100 cents = 1 gulden

Main Article
Postage stamps and postal history of Curaçao

See also
Netherlands Antilles

== Cyprus ==
Dates
1880 –
Capital
Nicosia
Currency
(1880) 12 pence = 1 shilling; 20 shillings = 1 pound
(1881) 40 paras = 1 piastre
(1955) 1000 mils = 1 pound
(1983) 100 cents = 1 pound

Main Article
Postage stamps and postal history of Cyprus

See also
Turkish Cypriot Posts

== Cyrenaica ==
Became part of Libya in 1952.

Dates
1923 – 1952
Capital
Benghazi
Currency
100 centesimi = 1 lira

Main Article
Postage stamps and postal history of Cyrenaica

== Cyrenaica (British Occupation) ==
Refer
Middle East Forces (MEF)

== Cythera ==
Refer
Ionian Islands

== Czechoslovakia ==
The federation was dissolved on 31 December 1992 with the formation of two independent states: Czech Republic and Slovakia.

Dates
1918 – 1939; 1945 – 1992
Capital
Prague
Currency
100 halířů (Hellers) = 1 Czechoslovak koruna

Main Article
Postage stamps and postal history of Czechoslovakia

See also
Czech Republic;
Siberia (Czechoslovak Army);
Slovakia

== Czech Republic ==
Czechoslovakia was dissolved on 31 Dec 1992 when the Czech Republic and Slovakia became separate states. Stamps were issued soon afterwards with the inscription ČESKÁ REPUBLIKA.

Dates
1993 –
Capital
Prague
Currency
100 halířů (Hellers) = 1 Czech koruna

Main Article
Postage stamps and postal history of the Czech Republic

See also
Czechoslovakia;
Slovakia

== Bibliography ==
- Stanley Gibbons Ltd, Europe and Colonies 1970, Stanley Gibbons Ltd, 1969
- Stanley Gibbons Ltd, various catalogues
- Stuart Rossiter & John Flower, The Stamp Atlas, W H Smith, 1989
- XLCR Stamp Finder and Collector's Dictionary, Thomas Cliffe Ltd, c.1960
