= Compendium of postage stamp issuers (Ni–Nz) =

Each "Article" in this category is a collection of entries about several stamp issuers, presented in alphabetical order. The entries are formulated on the micro model and so provide summary information about all known issuers.

See the Category:Compendium of postage stamp issuers page for details of the project.

== Nisiro/Nisiros ==
Refer
Nisyros

== Nisyros ==
Dates
1912 – 1932
Capital
Mandrakhi
Currency
100 centesimi = 1 lira

Refer
Aegean Islands (Dodecanese)

== Niuafo'ou ==
Dates
1983 –
Capital
Currency
100 seniti = 1 pa'anga

Main Article Needed

== Niue ==
Dates
1902 –
Capital
Alofi
Currency
(1902) 12 pence = 1 shilling; 20 shillings = 1 pound
(1967) 100 cents = 1 dollar

Main Article Needed

== Niutao ==
Refer
Tuvalu

== Norfolk Island ==
Dates
1947 –
Capital
Kingston
Currency
(1947) 12 pence = 1 shilling; 20 shillings = 1 pound
(1966) 100 cents = 1 dollar

Main Article
Postage stamps and postal history of Norfolk Island

== Norge ==
Refer
Norway

== North Borneo ==
Dates
1883 – 1963
Capital
Jesselton (Kota Kinabalu)
Currency
100 cents = 1 Malayan dollar

Main Article Needed

See also
Sabah

== North Borneo (British Military Administration) ==
Dates
1945 only
Currency
100 cents = 1 Malayan dollar

Refer
BA/BMA Issues

== North Borneo (Japanese Occupation) ==
Dates
1942 – 1945
Currency
(1942) 100 cents = 1 dollar
(1945) 10 rin = 1 sen; 100 sen = 1 yen

Refer
Japanese Occupation Issues

== North China (Japanese Occupation) ==
Dates
1942 – 1945
Currency
100 cents = 1 dollar

Refer
Japanese Occupation Issues

== North China (People's Post) ==
Dates
1948 – 1950
Currency
100 cents = 1 dollar

Refer
CPR Regional Issues

== North East China (People's Post) ==
Dates
1946 – 1950
Currency
100 cents = 1 dollar

Refer
CPR Regional Issues

== North Eastern Provinces ==
Dates
1946 – 1948
Currency
100 cents = 1 dollar

Refer
Chinese Provinces

== North German Confederation ==
Dates
1868 – 1871
Capital
Berlin
Currency
30 groschen = 1 thaler = 60 kreuzer = 1 gulden

Main Article Needed

See also
German States;
Germany (Imperial)

== North Ingermanland ==
Dates
1920 only
Capital
Currency
100 pennia = 1 mark

Refer
Russian Civil War Issues

== North Korea ==
Dates
1948 –
Capital
Pyongyang
Currency
100 chon = 1 won

Main Article Postage stamps and postal history of North Korea

Includes
South Korea (North Korean Occupation)

== North Korea (Russian Occupation) ==
Dates
1946 – 1948
Currency
100 chon = 1 won

Refer
Russian Occupation Issues

== North Vietnam ==
Dates
1946 – 1976
Capital
Hanoi
Currency
(1946) 100 cents = 1 dong
(1959) 100 xu = 1 dong

Main Article Needed

Includes
National Front for Liberation of South Vietnam

See also
South Vietnam;
Vietnam

== North West China (People's Post) ==
Dates
1949 only
Currency
100 cents = 1 dollar

Refer
CPR Regional Issues

== North West Pacific Islands ==
Dates
1915 – 1925
Capital
Rabaul
Currency
12 pence = 1 shilling; 20 shillings = 1 pound

Refer
Papua New Guinea

== North West Russia ==
Refer
North Western Army;
Northern Army;
Western Army

== North West Saxony (Russian Zone) ==
Dates
1945 – 1946
Capital
Leipzig
Currency
100 pfennige = 1 mark

Refer
Germany (Allied Occupation)

== North Western Army ==
Dates
1919 – 1920
Currency
100 kopecks = 1 Russian ruble

Refer
Russian Civil War Issues

== Northern Army ==
Dates
1919 – 1920
Currency
100 kopecks = 1 Russian ruble

Refer
Russian Civil War Issues

== Northern Epirus ==
Refer
Epirus

== Northern Ireland ==
Dates
1958 –
Capital
Belfast
Currency
(1958) 12 pence = 1 shilling; 20 shillings = 1 pound
(1971) 100 pence = 1 pound

Refer
Great Britain (Regional Issues)

== Northern Nigeria ==
Dates
1900 – 1914
Capital
Kaduna
Currency
12 pence = 1 shilling; 20 shillings = 1 pound

Refer
Nigerian Territories

== Northern Rhodesia ==
Dates
1925 – 1964
Capital
Lusaka
Currency
12 pence = 1 shilling; 20 shillings = 1 pound

Main Article Needed

See also
Zambia

== Northern Territory ==
Refer
South Australia

== Northern Zone, Morocco ==
Dates
1956 – 1958
Capital
Tetuan
Currency
100 centimos = 1 peseta

Refer
Morocco

See also
Spanish Morocco

== Norway ==
Dates
1855 –
Capital
Oslo
Currency
(1855) 120 skilling = 1 speciedaler
(1877) 100 ore = 1 krone

Main Article Needed

== Norwegian Dependency ==
Refer
Norway

== Nossi-Be ==
Dates
1889 – 1891
Capital
Hell-Ville
Currency
100 centimes = 1 franc

Refer
Madagascar & Dependencies

== Nova Scotia ==
Dates
1853 – 1868
Capital
Halifax
Currency
(1853) 12 pence = 1 shilling; 20 shillings = 1 pound
(1860) 100 cents = 1 dollar

Refer
Canadian Provinces

== Nowanuggur ==
Refer
Nawanager

== Nui ==
Refer
Tuvalu

== Nukufetau ==
Refer
Tuvalu

== Nukulaelae ==
Refer
Tuvalu

== Nyasaland Protectorate ==
Dates
1907 – 1964
Capital
Zomba
Currency
12 pence = 1 shilling; 20 shillings = 1 pound

Main Article Needed

Includes
Nyasa-Rhodesian Force (NF)

See also
British Central Africa;
Malawi

== Nyasa-Rhodesian Force (NF) ==
Dates
1916 only
Currency
12 pence = 1 shilling; 20 shillings = 1 pound

Refer
Nyasaland Protectorate

== Nyassa / Nyassa Company ==
Dates
1897 – 1929
Capital
Pemba
Currency
(1897) 1000 reis = 1 milreis
(1913) 100 centavos = 1 escudo

Refer
Postage stamps and postal history of the Nyassa Company

See also
Nyassa Company

== Bibliography ==
- Stanley Gibbons Ltd, Europe and Colonies 1970, Stanley Gibbons Ltd, 1969
- Stanley Gibbons Ltd, various catalogues
- Stuart Rossiter & John Flower, The Stamp Atlas, W H Smith, 1989
- XLCR Stamp Finder and Collector's Dictionary, Thomas Cliffe Ltd, c.1960
