= Compendium of postage stamp issuers (Sp–Sz) =

Each "article" in this category is a collection of entries about several stamp issuers, presented in alphabetical order. The entries are formulated on the micro model and so provide summary information about all known issuers.

See the Category:Compendium of postage stamp issuers page for details of the project.

== Spain ==
Dates
1850 –
Capital
Madrid
Currency
(1850) 8 cuartos = 1 real
(1866) 80 cuartos = 100 centimos = 1 escudo
(1867) 1000 milesimas = 100 centimos = 80 cuartos = 1 escudo
(1872) 100 centimos = 1 peseta
(2002) 100 cent = 1 euro

Main Article Postage stamps and postal history of Spain

See also
Canary Islands

== Spanish Guinea ==
Dates
1902–1960
Capital
Santa Isabel
Currency
100 centimos = 1 peseta

Main Article Postage stamps and postal history of Equatorial Guinea

Includes
Elobey, Annobon & Corisco;
Fernando Poo;
Rio Muni

== Spanish Marianas ==
Dates
1898–1899
Capital
Currency
100 centimos = 1 peseta

Refer
Spanish Philippines

See also
Mariana Islands

== Spanish Morocco ==
Dates
1914–1956
Capital
Tetuan
Currency
100 centimos = 1 peseta

Main Article Needed

== Spanish Philippines ==
Dates
1854–1898
Capital
Manila
Currency
(1854) 20 cuartos = 1 real; 8 reales = 1 peso
(1864) 100 centimos = 1 peso
(1871) 100 centimos = 1 escudo
(1872) 100 centimos = 1 peseta
(1876) 1000 milesimas = 100 centavos = 1 peso

Main Article Needed

Includes
Spanish Marianas

== Spanish Post Offices Abroad ==
Main Article Needed

Includes
Morocco (Spanish Post Offices);
Tangier (Spanish Post Office);
Tetuan (Spanish Post Office)

== Spanish Sahara ==
Dates
1924–1975
Capital
El Aaiun
Currency
100 centimos = 1 peseta

Refer
Spanish West Africa

== Spanish West Africa ==
The general issue was for use in Ifni and Spanish Sahara.

Dates
1949–1951
Currency
100 centimos = 1 peseta

Main Article Needed

Includes
Cape Juby;
Ifni;
La Aguëra;
Rio de Oro;
Spanish Sahara

== Srba Hrvata Slovena ==
Refer
Yugoslavia

== Sremsko Baranjska Oblast (Croatia) ==
After Croatia recovered Krajina and Eastern Slavonia from the autonomous republic of Srpska Krajina in 1995, Eastern Slavonia was placed under UN administration and called Sremsko Baranjska Oblast (Srem and Baranya Region). Stamps were issued soon afterwards.

Postal administration was transferred back to Croatia on 19 May 1997 and separate issues ceased at that time. Eastern Slavonia as a whole was incorporated back into the Republic of Croatia on 15 January 1998.

Dates
1995–1997
Capital
Currency
100 paras = 1 dinar

Refer
Croatia

See also
Srpska Krajina (Croatia)

== Sri Lanka ==
Dates
1972 –
Capital
Colombo
Currency
100 cents = 1 rupee

Main Article Postage stamps and postal history of Sri Lanka

See also
Ceylon

== Srpska ==
Refer
Bosnian Serb Republic

== Srpska Krajina (Croatia) ==
After Croatia declared itself independent of Yugoslavia in 1991, Croatian Serbs in Krajina, Western Slavonia and Eastern Slavonia proclaimed their allegiance to Yugoslavia and formed the Republic of Srpska Krajina under UN protection. Elections for a president and parliament were held in January 1994.

In 1995, the Republic of Croatia began to recover the Serb territories. Krajina and Western Slavonia were incorporated back into Croatia that year while Eastern Slavonia was placed under UN administration and called Sremsko Baranjska Oblast (Srem and Baranya Region).

Stamps were issued soon after Srpska Krajina was proclaimed and continued until the Croatian recovery of Krajina. Later issues were made by Sremsko Baranjska Oblast (q.v.).

Dates
1993–1995
Capital
Currency
100 paras = 1 dinar

Refer
Croatia

See also
Sremsko Baranjska Oblast (Croatia)

== Stadt Post Basel ==
Refer
Basle

== Stampalia ==
Refer
Astypalaea

== Stellaland Republic ==
A temporary Boer republic was established in Stellaland, which was the area surrounding Vryburg, on 26 July 1882. In 1885 it was annexed by Britain and incorporated into British Bechuanaland.

There was one local issue of six stamps on 1 February 1884.

Dates
1884–1885
Capital
Vryburg
Currency
12 pence = 1 shilling; 20 shillings = 1 pound

Refer
Cape of Good Hope

See also
Vryburg

== Stockholm ==
Dates
1856–1862
Currency
(1855) 48 skilling = 1 riksdaler
(1858) 100 ore = 1 riksdaler

Refer
Sweden

== Straits Settlements ==
Dates
1867–1942
Capital
Singapore
Currency
100 cents = 1 dollar

Includes
Labuan

== Strasbourg ==
Refer
Council of Europe (Strasbourg)

== Sudan ==
Earliest issues were Egyptian stamps overprinted SOUDAN.

Dates
1897 –
Capital
Khartoum
Currency
1000 milliemes = 100 piastres = 1 pound

Main Article Postage stamps and postal history of Sudan

== Sudetenland ==
Refer
Asch (Sudetenland)

== Suez Canal Company ==
During the construction period 1859–69, the company ran a mail service that was taken over by the Egyptian government in 1868. Some special stamps (unofficial only) were issued in 1868.

Refer
Egypt

== Suidafrika ==
Refer
South Africa

== Sumatra (Japanese Occupation) ==
Dates
1943–1945
Currency
100 cents = 1 gulden

Refer
Japanese Occupation Issues

== Sungei Ujong ==
Dates
1878–1895
Capital
Seremban
Currency
100 cents = 1 dollar

Main Article Needed

See also
Malaysia

== Suomi ==
Refer
Finland

== Surinam/Suriname ==
Dates
1873 –
Capital
Paramaribo
Currency
100 cents = 1 gulden

Main Article Postage stamps and postal history of Suriname

== Sverige ==
Refer
Sweden

== Swaziland ==
Dates
1933 –
Capital
Mbabane
Currency
(1889) 12 pence = 1 shilling; 20 shillings = 1 pound
(1961) 100 cents = 1 rand
(1974) 100 cents = 1 lilangeni (note: plural is emalangeni)

Main Article Postage stamps and postal history of Swaziland

Includes
Swaziland (Provisional Government)

== Swaziland (Provisional Government) ==
Dates
1889–1894
Capital
Mbabane
Currency
12 pence = 1 shilling; 20 shillings = 1 pound

Refer
Swaziland

== Sweden ==
Dates
1855 –
Capital
Stockholm
Currency
(1855) 48 skilling = 1 riksdaler
(1858) 100 ore = 1 riksdaler
(1875) 100 ore = 1 krona

Includes
Stockholm

== Swiss Cantonal Administration ==
Refer
Basle;
Geneva;
Switzerland;
Zurich

== Swiss Cantonal Issues ==
Main Article Needed

Includes
Basle;
Geneva;
Zurich

== Swiss PTT ==
Refer
United Nations (UN)

== Swiss Transitional Issues ==
Refer
Geneva;
Switzerland;
Zurich

== Switzerland ==
Dates
1850 –
Capital
Bern
Currency
(1850) 100 rappen = 1 franken
(1862) 100 centimes = 1 franc

See also
Swiss Cantonal Issues

== Syme ==
Italian colony in the Dodecanese which used the general EGEO issues and had its own stamps inscribed SIMI, the Italian (and Greek) name of the island.

Dates
1912–1932
Capital
Simi
Currency
100 centesimi = 1 lira

Refer
Aegean Islands (Dodecanese)

== Syria ==
Dates
1924 –
Capital
Damascus
Currency
100 centimes = 1 piastre

Main Article Postage stamps and postal history of Syria

See also
United Arab Republic (UAR)

== Syria (French Occupation) ==
Issues in both Egyptian and Syrian currency overprinted TEO or OMF.

Dates
1919–1924
Currency
(1919) 40 paras = 10 milliemes = 1 piastre
(1920) 100 centimes = 1 piastre

Refer
French Occupation Issues

== Szechwan ==
Dates
1933 only
Currency
100 cents = 1 dollar

Refer
Chinese Provinces

== Szeged ==
Dates
1919 only
Capital
Szeged
Currency
100 filler = 1 korona

Main Article Needed

See also
Hungary

== Yugoslavia ==
Overprints on Yugoslav stamps issued in Trieste.

Refer
Trieste (Yugoslav Military Government)

== Bibliography ==
- Stanley Gibbons Ltd, Europe and Colonies 1970, Stanley Gibbons Ltd, 1969
- Stanley Gibbons Ltd, various catalogues
- Stuart Rossiter & John Flower, The Stamp Atlas, W H Smith, 1989
- XLCR Stamp Finder and Collector's Dictionary, Thomas Cliffe Ltd, c.1960
