= Compendium of postage stamp issuers (L) =

Each "article" in this category is a collection of entries about several stamp issuers, presented in alphabetical order. The entries are formulated on the micro model and so provide summary information about all known issuers.

See the Category:Compendium of postage stamp issuers page for details of the project.

== La Agüera ==
Lagouira aka La Gouera is a city on the Atlantic coast of Africa at the southern tip of Western Sahara, on the western side of the Ras Nouadhibou peninsula. It was called La Agüera when it came into existence in 1920 as a short-lived Spanish colonial possession. It was originally a Spanish air base. The stamps were other Spanish types overprinted with "La Agüera".

Dates
1920–1924
Currency
100 centimos = 1 peseta

Refer
Spanish West Africa

== Labuan ==
Dates
1879–1906
Capital
Currency
100 cents = 1 dollar

Refer
Straits Settlements

== La Canea ==
Refer
Khania (Italian Post Office)

== Lagos ==
Dates
1874–1906
Currency
12 pence = 1 shilling; 20 shillings = 1 pound

Refer
Nigerian Territories

== Laibach (German Occupation) ==
Dates
1943–1945
Capital
Ljubljana
Currency
100 centesimi = 1 lira

Refer
German Occupation Issues (World War II)

See also
Lubiana (Italian Occupation)

== LANSA ==
Dates
1950–1951
Currency
100 centavos = 1 peso

Refer
Colombian Territories

== Laos ==
Dates
1951 –
Capital
Vientiane
Currency
(1951) 100 cents = 1 piastre
(1955) 100 cents = 1 kip

Main Article Needed

== Las Bela ==
Dates
1897 only
Capital
Bela
Currency
12 pies = 1 anna; 16 annas = 1 rupee

Refer
Indian Native States

== Latakia ==
Dates
1931–1937
Capital
Latakia
Currency
100 centimes = 1 piastre

Refer
Alaouites

See also
Syria

== Lattaquie ==
Refer
Latakia

== Latvia ==
Dates
1991 –
Capital
Riga
Currency
(1991) 100 kopecks = 1 Latvian rouble
(1993) 100 santimu = 1 lats

Main Article Needed

Includes
Latvia (pre–Soviet)

See also
Union of Soviet Socialist Republics (USSR)

== Latvia (pre-Soviet) ==
Dates
1918–1940
Capital
Riga
Currency
(1918) 100 kopecks = 1 Latvian rouble
(1923) 100 santimi (centimes) = 1 lats

Refer
Latvia

== Latvia (German Occupation) ==
Dates
1941 only
Currency
100 kopecks = 1 Russian ruble

Refer
German Occupation Issues (World War II)

== Latvija ==
Refer
Latvia

== League of Nations (Geneva) ==
Dates
1922–1944
Currency
100 centimes = 1 franc

Refer
International Organisations

== Lebanon ==
Dates
1924 –
Capital
Beirut
Currency
100 centimes = 1 piastre

Main Article Needed

Includes
Greater Lebanon

== Leeward Islands ==
Dates
1890–1956
Capital
St John's (Antigua)
Currency
(1890) 12 pence = 1 shilling; 20 shillings = 1 pound
(1951) 100 cents = 1 dollar

Main Article Postage stamps and postal history of the Leeward Islands

== Leipzig ==
Refer
North West Saxony (Russian Zone)

== Lemnos ==
Dates
1912–1913
Capital
Kastron
Currency
100 lepta = 1 drachma

Refer
Greek Occupation Issues

== Lero ==
Refer
Leros

== Leros ==
Dates
1912–1932
Capital
Ayia Marina
Currency
100 centesimi = 1 lira

Refer
Aegean Islands (Dodecanese)

== Lesbos ==
Dates
1912–1913
Capital
Mytilene
Currency
Greek and Turkish both used

Refer
Greek Occupation Issues

== Lesotho ==
Dates
1966 –
Capital
Maseru
Currency
100 cents = 1 rand

Main Article
Postage stamps and postal history of Lesotho

See also
Basutoland

== Lesser Sunda Islands ==
Refer
Japanese Naval Control Area

== Levant ==
Refer
Free French Forces in the Levant

== Liban ==
Refer
Lebanon

== Liberia ==
Dates
1860 –
Capital
Monrovia
Currency
100 cents = 1 dollar

Main Article Needed

== Libia ==
Refer
Libya

== Libya ==
Dates
1912 –
Capital
Tripoli
Currency
(1912) 100 centesimi = 1 lira
(1950) 1000 milliemes = 1 Libyan pound
(1972) 1000 dirhams = 1 dinar

Main Article Needed

== Libya (Italian Post Offices) ==
Refer
Benghazi (Italian Post Office);
Tripoli (Italian Post Office)

== Liechtenstein ==
Dates
1912 –
Capital
Vaduz
Currency
(1912) 100 heller = 1 krone
(1921) 100 rappen = 1 (Swiss) franc

Main Article Needed

== Lietuva ==
Refer
Lithuania

== Limnos ==
Refer
Lemnos

== Lipsos ==
Dates
1912–1932
Capital
Currency
100 centesimi = 1 lira

Refer
Aegean Islands (Dodecanese)

== Lisso ==
Refer
Lipsos

== Lithuania ==
Dates
1990 –
Capital
Vilnius
Currency
(1990) 100 kopecks = 1 Russian ruble
(1992) talonas
(1993) 100 centu = 1 Lithuanian litas

Main Article Needed

Includes
Lithuania (pre–Soviet)

See also
Klaipėda;
Union of Soviet Socialist Republics (USSR)

== Lithuania (pre-Soviet) ==
Dates
1918–1940
Capital
Vilnius
Currency
(1918) 100 skatiku = 1 auksinas
(1922) 100 centu = 1 litas

Refer
Lithuania

== Lithuania (German Occupation) ==
Dates
1941 only
Currency
100 kopecks = 1 Russian ruble

Refer
German Occupation Issues (World War II)

See also
Ostland

== Lithuanian Occupation of Memel ==
Refer
Klaipėda

== Litwa Srodkowa ==
Refer
Central Lithuania (Polish Occupation)

== Livonia ==
Refer
Wenden

== Lombardy & Venetia ==
Dates
1850–1866
Capital
Milan (to 1859); Venice (1859–66)
Currency
(1850) 100 centesimi = 1 lira
(1858) 100 soldi = 1 florin
(1858) 100 kreutzer = 1 florin

Main Article Needed

See also
Austria

== Long Island (British Occupation) ==
Dates
1916 only
Currency
12 pence = 1 shilling; 20 shillings = 1 pound

Refer
British Occupation Issues

== Lorraine (German Occupation) ==
Dates
1940–1941
Currency
100 pfennige = 1 mark

Refer
German Occupation Issues (World War II)

== Lothringen ==
Refer
Lorraine (German Occupation)

== Lourenço Marques ==
Dates
1895–1921
Currency
(1895) 1000 reis = 1 milreis
(1912) 100 centavos = 1 escudo

Refer
Mozambique Territories

== Lübeck ==
Dates
1859–1868
Currency
16 schillinge = 1 mark

Refer
German States

== Lubiana (Italian Occupation) ==
Dates
1941 only
Currency
100 paras = 1 dinar

Refer
Italian Occupation Issues

See also
Laibach (German Occupation)

== Lucca ==
Refer
Tuscany

== Luxembourg ==
Dates
1852 –
Capital
Luxembourg
Currency
(1852) 121/2 centimes = 1 silver groschen; 100 centimes = 1 franc
(1940) 100 pfennige = 1 reichsmark
(1944) 100 centimes = 1 franc
(2002) 100 cent = 1 euro

Main Article Needed

== Luxembourg (German Occupation) ==
Dates
1940–1944
Currency
100 pfennige = 1 reichsmark

Refer
German Occupation Issues (WW2)

== Lydenburg ==
Dates
1900–1902
Currency
12 pence = 1 shilling; 20 shillings = 1 pound

Refer
Transvaal

== Bibliography ==
- Stanley Gibbons Ltd, Europe and Colonies 1970, Stanley Gibbons Ltd, 1969
- Stanley Gibbons Ltd, various catalogues
- Stuart Rossiter & John Flower, The Stamp Atlas, W H Smith, 1989
- XLCR Stamp Finder and Collector's Dictionary, Thomas Cliffe Ltd, c.1960
