= Compendium of postage stamp issuers (F) =

Each "article" in this category is a collection of entries about several stamp issuers, presented in alphabetical order. The entries are formulated on the micro model and so provide summary information about all known issuers.

See the Category:Compendium of postage stamp issuers page for details of the project.

== Falkland Islands ==
Dates
1878 –
Capital
Port Stanley
Currency
(1878) 12 pence = 1 shilling, 20 shillings = 1 pound
(1971) 100 pence = 1 pound

See also
British Antarctic Territory;
Falkland Islands Dependencies;
South Georgia & South Sandwich Islands

== Falkland Islands Dependencies ==
Dates
1946 –
Currency
(1946) 12 pence = 1 shilling, 20 shillings = 1 pound
(1971) 100 pence = 1 pound

Main Article
Postage stamps and postal history of the Falkland Islands Dependencies

Includes
Graham Land (Falkland Island Dependencies);
South Georgia (Falkland Islands Dependencies);
South Orkneys (Falkland Islands Dependencies);
South Shetlands (Falkland Islands Dependencies)

See also
British Antarctic Territory;
Falkland Islands;
South Georgia & South Sandwich Islands

== Far Eastern Republic ==
Dates
1920 – 1922
Capital
Vladivostok
Currency
100 kopecks = 1 Russian ruble

Refer
Russian Civil War Issues

== Faridkot ==
Dates
1879 – 1887
Currency
(1879) 1 folus = 1 paisa = 1/4 anna
(1886) 12 pies = 1 anna; 16 annas = 1 rupee

Refer
Faridkot in Indian Convention states

== Faroe Islands ==
Dates
1976 –
Capital
Thorshavn
Currency
100 ore = 1 krone
Main article
Postage stamps and postal history of the Faroe Islands

== Farquhar ==
Refer
Zil Elwannyen Sesel

== Federal People's Republic of Yugoslavia ==
Refer
Yugoslavia

== Federated Malay States ==
Dates
1900 – 1935
Capital
Kuala Lumpur
Currency
100 cents = 1 dollar

Main Article

See also
Malaysia

== Fernando Poo ==
Now called Bioko (also spelled Bioco), Fernando Poo is an island off the west coast of Africa in the Gulf of Guinea. Formerly part of Spanish Guinea, it is now part of Equatorial Guinea.

Dates
1868 – 1968
Capital
Santa Isabel
Currency
100 centimos = 1 peseta

Refer
Spanish Guinea

== Fezzan ==
Dates
1943 – 1951
Capital
Sabha
Currency
French (100 centimes = 1 franc)

Main Article

Includes
Ghadames

See also
Algeria;
Cyrenaica;
French Occupation Issues;
Libya;
Tripolitania

== Fezzan (French Occupation) ==
Refer
Fezzan

== Fiji ==
Dates
1870 –
Capital
Suva
Currency
(1870) 12 pence = 1 shilling, 20 shillings = 1 pound
(1969) 100 cents = 1 dollar

Main Article
Postage stamps and postal history of Fiji

== Finland ==
Dates
1856 –
Capital
Helsinki
Currency
(1856) 100 kopecks = 1 Russian ruble
(1865) 100 penni = 1 markka
(1963) 100 old marks = 1 new mark
(2002) 100 cent = 1 euro

Main Article
Postage stamps and postal history of Finland

== Finnish Occupation Issues ==
Main Article

Includes
Aunus (Finnish Occupation);
Eastern Karelia (Finnish Occupation)

== Fiume ==
Includes
Arbe;
Fiume (Free State);
Fiume (Yugoslav Occupation);
Veglia

== Fiume (Free State) ==
Dates
1918 – 1924
Capital
Fiume
Currency
(1918) 100 Fillér = 1 krone
(1919) 100 centesimi = 1 corona
(1920) 100 centesimi = 1 lira

Refer
Fiume

== Fiume (Yugoslav Occupation) ==
Dates
1945 – 1947
Currency
100 centesimi = 1 lira

Refer
Fiume

== Fiume & Kupa Zone (Italian Occupation) ==
Dates
1941 – 1942
Currency
100 paras = 1 dinar

Refer
Italian Occupation Issues

== Formosa ==
Refer
Chinese Nationalist Republic (Taiwan);
Taiwan

== France ==
Dates
1849 –
Capital
Paris
Currency
(1849) 100 centimes = 1 franc
(2002) 100 cent = 1 euro

Main Article
Postage stamps and postal history of France

== Free French Forces in the Levant ==
Dates
1942 – 1946
Currency
100 centimes = 1 franc

Refer
French Occupation Issues

== French Colonies ==
Dates
1859 – 1886
Currency
100 centimes = 1 franc

Includes
French Committee of National Liberation

== French Committee of National Liberation ==
Dates
1943 – 1945
Currency
100 centimes = 1 franc

Refer
French Colonies

== French Community ==
Refer
French Colonies

== French Congo ==
Dates
1891 – 1906
Capital
Brazzaville
Currency
100 centimes = 1 franc

Main Article

See also
Congo Republic;
French Equatorial Africa;
Middle Congo

== French Equatorial Africa (AEF) ==
Dates
1936 – 1958
Capital
Brazzaville
Currency
100 centimes = 1 franc

Main Article

See also
Central African Republic;
Chad;
Congo Republic;
French Congo;
Gabon;
Middle Congo;
Oubangui–Chari

== French Guiana ==
Dates
1886 – 1947
Capital
Cayenne
Currency
100 centimes = 1 franc

Main Article

Includes
Inini

== French Guinea ==
Dates
1892 – 1944
Capital
Conakry
Currency
100 centimes = 1 franc

Main Article

See also
French West Africa;
Guinea

== French Indian Settlements ==
Dates
1892 – 1954
Currency
(1892) 100 centimes = 1 franc
(1923) 24 caches = 1 fanon; 8 fanons = 1 rupee

Main Article

== French Levant ==
Refer
French Post Offices in the Turkish Empire

== French Morocco ==
Dates
1914 – 1956
Capital
Rabat
Currency
100 centimes = 1 franc

Includes
French Protectorate, Morocco

See also
Morocco (French Post Offices)

== French Occupation Issues ==
Main Article

Includes
Arad (French Occupation);
Castelrosso (French Occupation);
Cilicia (French Occupation);
Free French Forces in the Levant;
Korce (Koritza);
Memel (French Administration);
Syria (French Occupation)

See also
Fezzan

== French Oceanic Settlements ==
Dates
1892 – 1956
Capital
Papeete (Tahiti)
Currency
100 centimes = 1 franc

Main Article

Includes
Tahiti

See also
French Polynesia

== French Polynesia ==
Dates
1958 –
Capital
Papeete (Tahiti)
Currency
100 centimes = 1 franc

See also
French Oceanic Settlements;
Tahiti

== French Post Offices Abroad ==
Main Article

Includes
China (French Post Offices);
Ethiopia (French Post Offices);
Japan (French Post Offices);
Madagascar (French Post Offices);
Majunga (French Post Office);
Morocco (French Post Offices);
Tangier (French Post Office);
Tientsin (French Post Office);
Zanzibar (French Post Office)

See also
Crete (French Post Offices);
Egypt (French Post Offices);
French Post Offices in the Turkish Empire

== French Post Offices in the Turkish Empire ==
Dates
1885 – 1923
Currency
French and Turkish both used

Main Article

Includes
Beirut (French Post Office);
Dedêagatz (French Post Office);
Kavalla (French Post Office);
Port Lagos (French Post Office);
Vathy (French Post Office)

See also
French Post Offices Abroad;
Crete (French Post Offices);
Egypt (French Post Offices)

== French Protectorate, Morocco ==
Dates
1914 – 1915
Capital
Rabat
Currency
100 centimes = 1 franc

Refer
French Morocco

== French Somali Coast ==
Dates
1902 – 1967
Capital
Djibouti
Currency
100 centimes = 1 franc

Main Article

See also
Djibouti;
French Territory of Afars & Issas

== French Soudan ==
Dates
1894 – 1944
Capital
Bamako
Currency
100 centimes = 1 franc

Main Article

Includes
Senegambia & Niger;
Upper Senegal & Niger

See also
French West Africa;
Mali Federation;
Mali Republic

== French Southern and Antarctic Territories ==
Dates
1955 –
Capital
Port-aux-Francais
Currency
100 centimes = 1 franc
Main Article
Postage stamps and postal history of the French Southern and Antarctic Territories

== French Territory of Afars & Issas ==
Dates
1967 – 1977
Capital
Djibouti
Currency
100 centimes = 1 franc

Main Article

See also
Djibouti;
French Somali Coast

== French West Africa ==
Dates
1944 – 1959
Capital
Dakar
Currency
100 centimes = 1 franc

Main Article

Includes
Dakar–Abidjan

See also
Dahomey;
French Guinea;
French Soudan;
Ivory Coast;
Mauritania;
Niger;
Senegal;
Upper Volta

== French Zone (General Issues) ==
Dates
1945 – 1946
Currency
100 pfennige = 1 mark

Refer
Germany (Allied Occupation)

== Friendly Islands ==
Refer
Tonga

== Fujeira ==
Dates
1964 – 1972
Currency
(1964) 100 naye paise = 1 rupee
(1967) 100 dirhams = 1 riyal

Refer
Trucial States

== Funafuti ==
Refer
Tuvalu

== Funchal ==
Dates
1892 – 1905
Capital
Funchal
Currency
1000 reis = 1 milreis

Main Article

See also
Madeira

== Bibliography ==
- Stanley Gibbons Ltd, Europe and Colonies 1970, Stanley Gibbons Ltd, 1969
- Stanley Gibbons Ltd, various catalogues
- Stuart Rossiter & John Flower, The Stamp Atlas, W H Smith, 1989
- XLCR Stamp Finder and Collector's Dictionary, Thomas Cliffe Ltd, c.1960
