= Compendium of postage stamp issuers (Sm–So) =

Each "article" in this category is a collection of entries about several stamp issuers, presented in alphabetical order. The entries are formulated on the micro model and so provide summary information about all known issuers.

See the Category:Compendium of postage stamp issuers page for details of the project.

== Smirne (Italian Post Office) ==
Dates
1909–1911
Currency
40 paras = 1 piastre

Refer
Italian Post Offices in the Turkish Empire

== Smyrne (Russian Post Office) ==
Dates
1909–1910
Currency
40 paras = 1 piastre

Refer
Russian Post Offices in the Turkish Empire

== SO 1920 ==
Refer
East Silesia

== Solomon Islands ==
Dates
1975–
Capital
Honiara
Currency
100 cents = 1 dollar

Main Article Postage stamps and postal history of the Solomon Islands

Includes
British Solomon Islands

== Somalia ==
Under UN control with Italian administration 1950–60. Became an independent republic in 1960 and was enlarged by addition of Somaliland Protectorate.

Dates
1950–
Capital
Mogadishu
Currency
(1950) 100 centesimi = 1 somalo
(1961) 100 cents = 1 Somali shilling

Main Article Postage stamps and postal history of Somalia

== Somalia (British Administration) ==
Dates
1950 only
Currency
100 cents = 1 shilling

Refer
BA/BMA Issues

== Somalia (British Military Administration) ==
BMA Somalia.

Dates
1948– 1950
Currency
100 cents = 1 shilling

Refer
BA/BMA Issues

== Somalia (British Occupation) ==
Refer
East Africa Forces

See also
Somalia (British Administration);
Somalia (British Military Administration)

== Somaliland Protectorate ==
Dates
1904–1960
Capital
Hargeisa
Currency
(1904) 16 annas = 1 rupee
(1951) 100 cents = 1 shilling

Main Article Postage stamps and postal history of British Somaliland

Includes
British Somaliland

== Soruth (Saurashtra) ==
Stamps of Soruth (Saurashtra) were at first issued in Junagadh only but later were extended to include the Saurashtra Union of Jasdan, Morvi, Nawanagar, Soruth and Wadhwan. Stamps of the 1929–1949 period were overprinted SARKARI.

Dates
1864–1949
Capital
Junagadh
Currency
12 pies = 1 anna; 16 annas = 1 rupee

Refer
Indian Native States

== Soudan ==
Refer
Sudan

== South Africa ==
Dates
1910–
Capital
Pretoria
Currency
(1910) 12 pence = 1 shilling; 20 shillings = 1 pound
(1961) 100 cents = 1 rand

Main Article Postage stamps and postal history of South Africa

== South African Republic ==
Dates
1869–1902
Capital
Pretoria
Currency
12 pence = 1 shilling; 20 shillings = 1 pound

Refer
Transvaal

== South African Territories ==
Main Article Needed

Includes
Bophutatswana;
Ciskei;
Transkei;
Venda

== South Arabian Federation ==
Dates
1963–1968
Capital
Aden
Currency
(1963) 100 cents = 1 shilling
(1965) 1000 fils = 1 dinar

Refer
Aden Protectorate States

== South Australia ==
Dates
1855–1912
Capital
Adelaide
Currency
12 pence = 1 shilling; 20 shillings = 1 pound

See also
Australia

== South Bulgaria ==
Dates
1885 only
Capital
Plovdiv (Philippopolis)
Currency
40 paras = 1 piastre

Refer
Bulgarian Territories

== South China (People's Post) ==
Dates
1949 only
Currency
100 cents = 1 dollar

Refer
CPR Regional Issues

== South East Saxony (Russian Zone) ==
Dates
1945–1946
Capital
Dresden
Currency
100 pfennige = 1 mark

Refer
Germany (Allied Occupation)

== South Georgia ==
Dates
1963–1980
Capital
Grytviken
Currency
(1963) 12 pence = 1 shilling; 20 shillings = 1 pound
(1971) 100 pence = 1 pound

Refer
South Georgia & South Sandwich Islands

== South Georgia (Falkland Islands Dependencies) ==
Stamps of Falkland Islands overprinted SOUTH GEORGIA.

Dates
1944–1946
Capital
Grytviken
Currency
12 pence = 1 shilling; 20 shillings = 1 pound

Refer
Falkland Islands Dependencies

== South Georgia & South Sandwich Islands ==
A continuation of the South Georgia issues but with the inscription changed to acknowledge the South Sandwich Islands as part of the same territory. The South Sandwich Islands have never had any permanent inhabitants.

Dates
1980–
Capital
Grytviken
Currency
100 pence = 1 pound

Main Article Needed
Postage stamps and postal history of South Georgia and the South Sandwich Islands

Includes
South Georgia

== South Kasai ==
Dates
1961–1962
Capital
Lusambo
Currency
100 centimes = 1 franc

Refer
Zaire

== South Korea ==
Dates
1946–
Capital
Seoul
Currency
(1946) 100 chon = 1 won
(1953) 100 won = 1 hwan
(1962) 100 chon = 1 won

Main Article Postage stamps and postal history of South Korea

== South Korea (North Korean Occupation) ==
Dates
1950 only
Currency
100 chon = 1 won

Refer
North Korea

== South Lithuania (Russian Occupation) ==
Russian forces in Grodno issued Arms types of Russia with an overprint of LIETUVA and a surcharge in local currency.

Dates
1919 only
Currency
100 skatiku = 1 auksinas

Refer
Russian Occupation Issues

== South Orkneys (Falkland Islands Dependencies) ==
Dates
1944–1946
Currency
12 pence = 1 shilling; 20 shillings = 1 pound

Refer
Falkland Islands Dependencies

== South Russia ==
Refer
Russian Civil War Issues

== South Shetlands (Falkland Islands Dependencies) ==
Dates
1944–1946
Currency
12 pence = 1 shilling; 20 shillings = 1 pound

Refer
Falkland Islands Dependencies

== South Sudan ==
Dates
2011-
Capital
Juba
Currency
100 piaster = 1 pound

Main Article Postage stamps and postal history of South Sudan

== South Vietnam ==
Dates
1955–1976
Capital
Saigon
Currency
100 cents = 1 piastre

Main Article Needed

See also
National Front for Liberation of South Vietnam;
North Vietnam;
Vietnam

== South West Africa ==
Dates
1923–1991
Capital
Windhoek
Currency
(1923) 12 pence = 1 shilling; 20 shillings = 1 pound
(1961) 100 cents = 1 rand

Main Article Needed

See also
German South West Africa;
Namibia

== South West China (People's Post) ==
Dates
1949–1950
Currency
100 cents = 1 dollar

Refer
CPR Regional Issues

== Southern Cameroons ==
Dates
1960–1961
Capital
Mamfe
Currency
12 pence = 1 shilling; 20 shillings = 1 pound

Refer
Nigerian Territories

== Southern Nigeria ==
Dates
1901–1914
Capital
Enugu
Currency
12 pence = 1 shilling; 20 shillings = 1 pound

Refer
Nigerian Territories

== Southern Rhodesia ==
Dates
1924–1964
Capital
Salisbury
Currency
12 pence = 1 shilling; 20 shillings = 1 pound

Refer
Rhodesia

== Southern Yemen ==
Dates
1968–1971
Capital
Aden
Currency
1000 fils = 1 dinar

Refer
Yemen

== Southern Zone, Morocco ==
Dates
1956–1958
Capital
Rabat
Currency
100 centimes = 1 franc

Refer
Morocco

See also
French Morocco

== Bibliography ==
- Stanley Gibbons Ltd, Europe and Colonies 1970, Stanley Gibbons Ltd, 1969
- Stanley Gibbons Ltd, various catalogues
- Stuart Rossiter & John Flower, The Stamp Atlas, W H Smith, 1989
- XLCR Stamp Finder and Collector's Dictionary, Thomas Cliffe Ltd, c.1960
