= Compendium of postage stamp issuers (V) =

Each "article" in this category is a collection of entries about several stamp issuers, presented in alphabetical order. The entries are formulated on the micro model and so provide summary information about all known issuers.

See the Category:Compendium of postage stamp issuers page for details of the project.

== Vaitupu ==
Refer
Tuvalu

== Valona (Italian Post Office) ==
Dates
1909–1916
Currency
40 paras = 1 piastre

Refer
Italian Post Offices in the Turkish Empire

== Van Diemen's Land ==
Dates
1853–1860
Capital
Hobart
Currency
12 pence = 1 shilling; 20 shillings = 1 pound

Main Article Needed
Postage stamps and postal history of Van Diemen's Land

== Vancouver Island ==
Dates
1865 only
Capital
Victoria
Currency
100 cents = 1 dollar
Refer
British Columbia

== Vanuatu ==
Dates
1980 –
Capital
Vila
Currency
(1980) 100 centimes = 1 franc
(1981) vatus

Main Article Postage stamps and postal history of Vanuatu

See also
New Hebrides

== Vathy (French Post Offices) ==
Dates
1893–1914
Currency
French and Turkish used concurrently

Refer
French Post Offices in the Turkish Empire

== Vatican City ==
Dates
1929 –
Currency
100 centesimi = 1 lira

Main Article Postage stamps and postal history of Vatican City

== Veglia ==
Dates
1920 only
Capital
Currency
100 centesimi = 1 lira

Refer
Fiume

== Venda ==
One of the territories ( Bantustans ) set up by the South African government as part of its apartheid policy. Although the territory itself did not acquire international recognition, its stamps were valid for postage.

Dates
1979 – 1994

Capital
Thohoyandou

Currency
100 cents = 1 rand

Refer
South African Territories

== Venezia Giulia (Italian Occupation) ==
Dates
1918–1919
Currency
Austrian and Italian used concurrently

Refer
Italian Occupation Issues

== Venezia Giulia & Istria ==
Main Article Needed

Includes
Istria (Yugoslav Occupation);
Venezia Giulia & Istria (Allied Military Government);
Venezia Giulia & Istria (Yugoslav Military Government);
Venezia Giulia & Istria (Yugoslav Occupation)

See also
Trieste;
Venezia Giulia (Italian Occupation)

== Venezia Giulia & Istria (Allied Military Government) ==
Dates
1945–1947
Currency
100 centesimi = 1 lira

Refer
Venezia Giulia & Istria

See also
Trieste

== Venezia Giulia & Istria (Yugoslav Military Government) ==
Dates
1945–1947
Currency
100 centesimi = 1 lira

Refer
Venezia Giulia & Istria

== Venezia Giulia & Istria (Yugoslav Occupation) ==
Dates
1945 only
Currency
100 centesimi = 1 lira

Refer
Venezia Giulia & Istria

== Venezuela ==
Dates
1859 –
Capital
Caracas
Currency
(1859) 100 centavos = 8 reales = 1 peso
(1879) 100 centesimos = 1 venezolano
(1880) 100 centimos = 1 bolívar

Main Article Postage stamps and postal history of Venezuela

== Victoria ==
Dates
1850–1912
Capital
Melbourne
Currency
12 pence = 1 shilling; 20 shillings = 1 pound

Main Article Needed

See also
Australia

== Victoria Land ==
Dates
1911–1912
Currency
12 pence = 1 shilling; 20 shillings = 1 pound

Refer
New Zealand Territories

== Vienna ==
Refer
United Nations (UN)

== Vietcong ==
Refer
National Front for Liberation of South Vietnam

== Vietnam ==
Dates
1976 –
Capital
Hanoi
Currency
100 xu = 1 dong

Main Article Postage stamps and postal history of Vietnam

Includes
Vietnam (French Colony)

== Vietnam (French Colony) ==
Dates
1945–1954
Capital
Hanoi
Currency
(1945) 100 cents = 1 piastre
(1945) 100 xu = 10 hao = 1 dong

Refer
Vietnam

== Vilnius ==
Refer
Lithuania (German Occupation)

== Virgin Islands ==
Dates
1866–1968
Capital
Road Town
Currency
(1866) 12 pence = 1 shilling; 20 shillings = 1 pound
(1951) 100 cents = 1 dollar

Refer
British Virgin Islands

== Vladivostok ==
Refer
Priamur & Maritime Provinces

== Volksrust ==
Dates
1902 only
Currency
12 pence = 1 shilling; 20 shillings = 1 pound

Refer
Transvaal

== VR Special Post ==
Refer
Vryburg

== VRI ==
Refer
Lydenburg;
Orange Free State;
Transvaal;
Volksrust;
Wolmaransstad

== Vryburg ==
Dates
1899–1900
Currency
12 pence = 1 shilling; 20 shillings = 1 pound

Refer
Cape of Good Hope

See also
Stellaland

== VU(J)NA-STT ==
Refer
STT-VUJA/STT-VUJNA

== Bibliography ==
- Stanley Gibbons Ltd, Europe and Colonies 1970, Stanley Gibbons Ltd, 1969
- Stanley Gibbons Ltd, various catalogues
- Stuart Rossiter & John Flower, The Stamp Atlas, W H Smith, 1989
- XLCR Stamp Finder and Collector's Dictionary, Thomas Cliffe Ltd, c.1960
