= Compendium of postage stamp issuers (Be–Br) =

Each "article" in this category is a collection of entries about several stamp issuers, presented in alphabetical order. The entries are formulated on the micro model and so provide summary information about all known issuers.

See the Category:Compendium of postage stamp issuers page for details of the project.

== Belgian Congo ==
Became the Congo Republic and later Zaire.

Dates
1909–1960
Capital
Leopoldville
Currency
100 centimes = 1 franc

Main Article Needed

See also
Congo Free State

== Belgian Occupation Issues ==
Main Article Needed

Includes
Eupen & Malmedy (Belgian Occupation);
German East Africa (Belgian Occupation);
Germany (Belgian Occupation)

== Belgium ==
Dates
1849 –
Capital
Brussels
Currency
(1849) 100 centimes = 1 franc
(2002) 100 cent = 1 euro

Main Article
Postage stamps and postal history of Belgium

== Belgium (German Occupation) ==
Dates
1914–1918
Currency
100 centimes = 1 franc

Refer
German Occupation Issues (WW1)

== Belize ==
Dates
1973 –
Capital
Belmopan
Currency
100 cents = 1 dollar

Main Article
Postage stamps and postal history of Belize

See also
British Honduras

== Belorussia ==
Refer
Belarus

== Benadir ==
Dates
1903–1905
Capital
Mogadishu
Currency
100 besa = 16 annas = 1 rupia

Refer
Italian Somaliland

== Benghazi (Italian Post Office) ==
Italy annexed Libya in 1912 and the office then issued stamps of Libya.

Dates
1901–1912
Currency
40 paras = 1 piastre

Refer
Italian Post Offices in the Turkish Empire

== Benin ==
Formerly Dahomey.

Dates
1976–
Capital
Porto-Novo
Currency
100 centimes = 1 franc

Main Article
Postage stamps and postal history of Benin

Includes
Benin (French Colony)

See also
Dahomey

== Benin (French Colony) ==
The French colony of Benin issued overprinted French Colonies stamps 1892–99 and was then incorporated in Dahomey. In 1976, Dahomey was renamed Benin.

Dates
1892–1899
Capital
Porto-Novo
Currency
100 centimes = 1 franc

Refer
Benin

== Bequia ==
Unauthorised issues only. Bequia is one of the islands of the Grenadines of St Vincent.

Refer
Grenadines of St Vincent

== Bergedorf ==
Became part of Hamburg in 1867.

Dates
1861–1867
Currency
16 schillings = 1 mark

Refer
German States

== Berlin–Brandenburg (Russian Zone) ==
Superseded by 1946 general issue for the American, British & Russian Zones.

Dates
1945 only
Capital
Berlin (Russian Zone)
Currency
100 pfennige = 1 mark

Refer
Germany (Allied Occupation)

== Bermuda ==
Dates
1865 –
Capital
Hamilton
Currency
(1865) 12 pence = 1 shilling; 20 shillings = 1 pound
(1970) 100 cents = 1 dollar

Main Article
Postage stamps and postal history of Bermuda

== Bessarabia ==
Refer
Moldova

== Beyrouth ==
Refer
Beirut (French Post Office);
Beirut (Russian Post Office)

== Bhopal ==
Dates
1876–1949
Currency
12 pies = 1 anna; 16 annas = 1 rupee

Refer
Indian Native States

== Bhor ==
Dates
1879–1901
Currency
12 pies = 1 anna; 16 annas = 1 rupee

Refer
Indian Native States

== Bhutan ==
Dates
1962 –
Capital
Thimphu
Currency
100 chetrum = 1 ngultrum (rupee)

Main Article
Postage stamps and postal history of Bhutan

== Biafra ==
Nigerian civil war issues.

Dates
1968–1969
Capital
Port Harcourt
Currency
12 pence = 1 shilling; 20 shillings = 1 pound

Main article
Postage stamps and postal history of Biafra

Refer
Nigerian Territories

== Bijawar ==
Dates
1935–1937
Currency
12 pies = 1 anna; 16 annas = 1 rupee

Refer
Indian Native States

== BMA ==
Refer
Eritrea (British Military Administration);
Malaya (British Military Administration);
North Borneo (British Military Administration);
Sarawak (British Military Administration);
Somalia (British Military Administration);
Tripolitania (British Military Administration)

== Bohemia and Moravia ==
Dates
1939–1945
Capital
Prague
Currency
100 haléřs = 1 koruna

Main article needed

== Bohmen und Mahren ==
Refer
Bohemia & Moravia

== Boka Kotorska ==
Refer
Dalmatia (German Occupation)

== Bolívar ==
Dates
1863–1904
Capital
Montería
Currency
100 centavos = 1 peso

Refer
Colombian Territories

== Bolivia ==
Dates
1867–
Capital
La Paz
Currency
(1867) 100 centavos = 1 boliviano
(1963) 100 centavos = 1 peso

Main Article
Postage stamps and postal history of Bolivia

== Bophutatswana ==
One of the territories ( Bantustans ) up by the South African government as part of its apartheid policy. Although the territory itself did not acquire international recognition, its stamps were valid for postage.

Dates
1977–1994
Capital
Mmabatho (aka Sun City)
Currency
100 cents = 1 rand

Refer
South African Territories

== Borneo ==
Refer
Japanese Naval Control Area

== Bosnia & Herzegovina ==
Dates
1993 –
Capital
Sarajevo
Currency
(1993) 100 paras = 1 dinar
(1997) 100 pfennig = 1 mark

Main Article
Postage stamps and postal history of Bosnia and Herzegovina

Includes
Bosnia & Herzegovina (Austro–Hungarian Empire);
Bosnia & Herzegovina (Provincial Issues);
Bosnia & Herzegovina (Yugoslav Regional Issues);
Croatian Posts (Bosnia)

See also
Bosnian Serb Republic;
Croatia;
Yugoslavia

== Bosnia & Herzegovina (Austro-Hungarian Empire) ==
Under the terms of the Treaty of Berlin 1878, Austria-Hungary was authorised to occupy Bosnia & Herzegovina which had previously been in the Turkish (Ottoman) Empire. In 1908, outright annexation took place and the country became an integral part of the Austro-Hungarian Empire.

During 1912–1918, all stamps were inscribed K-u-K MILITARPOST.

Dates
1878–1918
Capital
Sarajevo
Currency
(1878–1899) 100 kreutzer = 1 florin
(1900–1918) 100 heller = 1 crown

Refer
Bosnia & Herzegovina

== Bosnia & Herzegovina (Provincial Issues) ==
The 1918–21 issues were for provincial use only pending settlement of the political situation after World War I.

Dates
1918–1921
Capital
Sarajevo
Currency
100 heller = 1 krone

Refer
Bosnia & Herzegovina

== Bosnia & Herzegovina (Yugoslav Regional Issues) ==
There was a regional issue in 1945 during shortages of Yugoslav stamps in the aftermath of World War II.

Dates
1945 only
Capital
Sarajevo
Currency
100 banicas = 1 kuna

Refer
Bosnia & Herzegovina

== Bosnian Serb Republic ==
Following the collapse of communism in 1989, unrest between ethnic factions in Bosnia & Herzegovina developed into open hostilities. In particular, Serbian nationalists began forming Serbian Autonomous Regions (SARs) and these were rejected by the government in Sarajevo. The situation escalated after the government declared independence from Yugoslavia in March 1992. Despite world recognition of the new state, the Bosnian Serbs and the Yugoslav army attempted to take control of the country and besieged Sarajevo. Before long, a Bosnian Serb Republic (Republika Srpska) was proclaimed at Pale. It declared allegiance to Serb-dominated Yugoslavia.

By the Dayton Agreement of November 1995, the country became one state with two autonomous entities: the Federation of Bosnia and Herzegovina; and the Bosnian Serb Republic.

Stamps inscribed REPUBLIKA SRPSKA have been issued since 1992.

Dates
1992 –
Capital
Pale
Currency
100 paras = 1 dinar

Main Article Needed

See also
Bosnia & Herzegovina;
Croatian Posts (Bosnia);
Yugoslavia

== Botswana ==
Dates
1966 –
Capital
Gaborone
Currency
(1966) 100 cents = 1 rand
(1976) 100 thebe = 1 pula

Main Article
Postage stamps and postal history of Botswana

See also
Bechuanaland

== Bouvet Island ==
Refer
Norwegian Dependency

== Boyacá ==
Dates
1899–1903
Capital
Tunja
Currency
100 centavos = 1 peso

Refer
Colombian Territories

== Brazil ==
Dates
1843 –
Capital
Brasília
Currency
(1843) 1000 = 1 milreis
(1942) 100 centavos = 1 cruzeiro
(1967) 100 old cruzeiros = 1 new cruzeiro

Main Article
Postage stamps and postal history of Brazil

== Bremen ==
Bremen joined the North German Confederation in 1867.

Dates
1855–1867
Capital
Bremen
Currency
22 grote = 10 silbergroschen; 72 grote = 1 thaler

Main Article Needed

Refer
German States

== Bibliography ==
- Stanley Gibbons Ltd, Europe and Colonies 1970, Stanley Gibbons Ltd, 1969
- Stanley Gibbons Ltd, various catalogues
- Stuart Rossiter & John Flower, The Stamp Atlas, W H Smith, 1989
- XLCR Stamp Finder and Collector's Dictionary, Thomas Cliffe Ltd, c.1960
