= Compendium of postage stamp issuers (Na–Ni) =

Each "article" in this category is a collection of entries about several stamp issuers, presented in alphabetical order. The entries are formulated on the micro model and so provide summary information about all known issuers.

See the Category:Compendium of postage stamp issuers page for details of the project.

== Nabha ==
Dates
1885–1948
Currency
12 pies = 1 anna; 16 annas = 1 rupee

Refer
Nabha in Indian Convention states

== Nagorno-Karabakh ==
Dates
1993 –
Capital
Xankändi (Khankendy/Stepanakert)
Currency
(1993) 100 kopecks = 1 Russian rouble
(1995) 100 louma = 1 dram

Main Article Needed

== Nakhichevan ==
Dates
1993 only
Capital
Nakhichevan
Currency
100 qopik = 1 manat

Refer
Azerbaijan

== Namibia ==
Dates
1990 –
Capital
Windhoek
Currency
(1990) 100 cents = 1 rand
(1993) 100 cents = 1 dollar

Main Article Postage stamps and postal history of Namibia

See also
German South West Africa;
South West Africa

== Nandgaon ==
Dates
1892–1895
Currency
12 pies = 1 anna; 16 annas = 1 rupee

Refer
Indian Native States

== Nangking & Shanghai (Japanese Occupation) ==
Dates
1941–1945
Currency
(1941) 10 rin = 1 sen, 100 sen = 1 yen
(1943) 100 cents = 1 dollar

Refer
Japanese Occupation Issues

== Nanumaga ==
Refer
Tuvalu

== Nanumea ==
Refer
Tuvalu

== Naples ==
Dates
1858–1861
Currency
100 grana = 200 tornesi = 1 ducato

Refer
Italian States

== Natal ==
Dates
1857–1909
Capital
Pietermaritzburg
Currency
12 pence = 1 shilling; 20 shillings = 1 pound

Main Article Needed

See also
Zululand

== National Front for Liberation of South Vietnam ==
Dates
1963–1976
Currency
100 xu = 1 dong

Refer
North Vietnam

== Nauru ==
Dates
1916 –
Capital
Currency
(1916) 12 pence = 1 shilling; 20 shillings = 1 pound
(1966) 100 cents = 1 dollar

Main Article Needed

== Nawanager ==
Dates
1877–1895
Currency
6 docra = 1 anna

Refer
Indian Native States

== Neapolitan Provinces ==
Dates
1861–1862
Capital
Naples
Currency
100 grana = 200 tornesi = 1 ducato

Refer
Italian States

== Negri Sembilan ==
Dates
1891 –
Capital
Seremban
Currency
100 cents = 1 dollar

Main Article Needed

See also
Malaysia

== Nejd ==
Dates
1925–1926
Capital
Riyadh
Currency
40 paras = 1 piastre

Refer
Saudi Arabia

See also
Hejaz–Nejd

== Nepal ==
Dates
1881 –
Capital
Kathmandu
Currency
(1881) 16 annas = 1 rupee
(1907) 64 pice = 1 rupee
(1954) 100 paisa = 1 rupee

Main Article Needed

== Netherlands ==
Dates
1852 –
Capital
Amsterdam
Currency
(1852) 100 cents = 1 gulden (florin)
(2002) 100 cent = 1 euro

Main Article
Postage stamps and postal history of the Netherlands

== Netherlands Antilles ==
Dates
1949–2010
Capital
Willemstad
Currency
100 cents = 1 gulden (florin)

See also
Aruba;
Caribbean Netherlands;
Curaçao (Curaçao and Dependencies);
Curaçao (island country);
Sint Maarten;

== Netherlands Indies ==
Dates
1864–1948
Capital
Batavia (Djakarta)
Currency
100 cents = 1 gulden (florin)

Main Article Needed

== Netherlands Indies (Japanese Occupation) ==
Dates
Currency
100 sen (cents) = 1 rupee (gulden)

Refer
Japanese Occupation Issues

== Netherlands New Guinea ==
Dates
1950–1962
Capital
Hollandia (Djayapura)
Currency
100 cents = 1 gulden (florin)

Main Article Needed

See also
Netherlands Indies;
West Irian;
West New Guinea

== Nevis ==
Dates
1980 –
Capital
Charlestown
Currency
100 cents = 1 dollar

Main Article Needed

Includes
Nevis (British Colonial Issues)

See also
St Christopher Nevis & Anguilla

== Nevis (British Colonial Issues) ==
Dates
1861–1890
Capital
Charlestown
Currency
12 pence = 1 shilling; 20 shillings = 1 pound

Refer
Nevis

== New Amsterdam ==
Refer
French Southern & Antarctic Territories

== New Brunswick ==
Dates
1851–1868
Capital
Fredericton
Currency
(1851) 12 pence = 1 shilling; 20 shillings = 1 pound
(1860) 100 cents = 1 dollar

Refer
Canadian Provinces

== New Caledonia ==
Dates
1860 –
Capital
Noumea
Currency
100 centimes = 1 franc

Main Article Needed

== New Carlisle (Gaspé) ==
Dates
1851 only
Currency
12 pence = 1 shilling; 20 shillings = 1 pound

Refer
Canadian Provinces

== Newfoundland ==
Dates
1857–1949
Capital
St John's
Currency
(1857) 12 pence = 1 shilling; 20 shillings = 1 pound
(1861) 100 cents = 1 dollar

Main article
Postage stamps and postal history of Newfoundland

Refer
Canadian Provinces

== New Granada ==
Dates
1861 only
Capital
Bogotá
Currency
100 centavos = 1 peso

Refer
Colombian Territories

== New Guinea (Australian Administration) ==
Dates
1925–1942
Capital
Rabaul
Currency
12 pence = 1 shilling; 20 shillings = 1 pound

Refer
Papua New Guinea

== New Hebrides ==
Dates
1908–1980
Capital
Vila
Currency
(1908) French and British used concurrently
(1938) 100 gold centimes = 1 gold franc
(1977) 100 centimes = 1 franc

See also
Vanuatu

== New Republic ==
Dates
1886–1888
Capital
Vrijheid
Currency
12 pence = 1 shilling; 20 shillings = 1 pound

Refer
Transvaal

== New South Wales ==
Dates
1850–1913
Capital
Sydney
Currency
12 pence = 1 shilling; 20 shillings = 1 pound

See also
Australia

== New York ==
Refer
United Nations (UN)

== New Zealand ==
Dates
1855 –
Capital
Wellington
Currency
(1855) 12 pence = 1 shilling; 20 shillings = 1 pound
(1967) 100 cents = 1 dollar

Main Article Needed

== New Zealand Territories ==
Main Article Needed

Includes
King Edward VII Land;
Victoria Land

== NF ==
Refer
Nyasa–Rhodesian Force (NF)

== Nicaragua ==
Dates
1862 –
Capital
Managua
Currency
(1862) 100 centavos = 1 peso
(1925) 100 centavos = 1 cordoba

Main Article Needed

== Niger ==
Dates
1959 –
Capital
Niamey
Currency
100 centimes = 1 franc

Main Article Needed

Includes
Niger (French Colony)

See also
French West Africa

== Niger (French Colony) ==
Dates
1921–1944
Capital
Niamey
Currency
100 centimes = 1 franc

Refer
Niger

== Niger Coast Protectorate ==
Dates
1892–1902
Capital
Enugu
Currency
12 pence = 1 shilling; 20 shillings = 1 pound

Refer
Nigerian Territories

== Nigeria ==
Dates
1914 –
Capital
Lagos
Currency
(1914) 12 pence = 1 shilling; 20 shillings = 1 pound
(1973) 100 kobo = 1 naira

Main Article Needed

== Nigerian Territories ==
Main Article Needed

Includes
Biafra;
Lagos;
Niger Coast Protectorate;
Northern Nigeria;
Oil Rivers Protectorate;
Southern Cameroons;
Southern Nigeria

== Bibliography ==
- Stanley Gibbons Ltd, Europe and Colonies 1970, Stanley Gibbons Ltd, 1969
- Stanley Gibbons Ltd, various catalogues
- Stuart Rossiter & John Flower, The Stamp Atlas, W H Smith, 1989
- XLCR Stamp Finder and Collector's Dictionary, Thomas Cliffe Ltd, c.1960
