= Falkland Islands pound =

Currency of the Falkland Islands

- Current coins and banknotes

ISO 4217
- Code: FKP (numeric: 238)
- Subunit: 0.01

Units of account
- Base unit: pound
- Plural: pounds
- Symbol: £
- Nickname: quid (Note: The word "quid" in this sense has no plural form.)
- Subunit
- 1/100: penny
- Plural
- penny: pence
- Symbol
- penny: p

Denominations
- Banknotes: £5, £10, £20, £50
- Coins: 1p, 2p, 5p, 10p, 20p, 50p, £1, £2

Demographics
- User(s): Falkland Islands; South Georgia and the South Sandwich Islands (British Overseas Territories; used alongside sterling)

Issuance
- Currency board: Falkland Islands Commissioners of Currency
- Website: www.falklands.gov.fk

Valuation
- Inflation: 3.6%
- Source: The World Factbook, 1998
- Pegged with: sterling at par

The Falkland Islands pound is the currency issued by the Falkland Islands, a British Overseas Territory. The symbol is the pound sign, £. The ISO 4217 currency code is FKP. It is also used in South Georgia and the South Sandwich Islands. Its base unit is the pound, which is divided into 100 pence (singular is 'penny').

The Falkland Islands pound has always been pegged to sterling (GBP) at par, meaning they exchange at an equal rate. Consequently, coins and banknotes of both currencies are used interchangeably in the territory; the Falkland Island pound is not widely accepted in the United Kingdom itself, particularly banknotes. FKP coins have the same composition, shape, and mass of sterling coins.

== History ==
The pound was introduced following the reassertion of sovereignty in the Falklands Islands by the British in 1833. Initially, sterling coins circulated, in units of a pound subdivided into 20 shillings, each of 12 pence. Specific issues of banknotes have been made for the Falkland Islands since 1899. In 1971, the pound was decimalised and subdivided into 100 (new) pence. Coins have been minted specifically for the Falklands since 1974.

== Legislative basis ==
In Falkland Islands law, the Currency Ordinance 1987 states that the Falkland Islands pound is the currency of the Falkland Islands, and that it has parity with sterling.

References to 'pounds' in the Falklands Islands (such as in contracts and debts) refer to the Falkland Islands pound.

Falkland Island pounds can be exchanged for sterling on demand, but the Currency Commissioners are entitled to charge a percentage fee for doing so.

== Coins ==
In 1974, 1/2, 1, 2, 5 and 10 pence coins were introduced. 50 pence coins were introduced in 1980, followed by 20 pence in 1982, £1 in 1987 and a circulating £2 in 2004. The halfpenny coin was last issued in 1983 and was demonetised shortly after. Smaller versions of the 5p, 10p and 50p, corresponding to the current UK issues, were issued in 1998, replacing the larger versions (which for the 5p was eight years after its introduction in the UK). The introduction of the circulation £2 coin in 2004 was six years after the same coin was issued in the UK. In 2020, the Falklands Islands issued a new 12-sided bi-metallic £1 coin, matching both the composition and size of its UK counterpart, while also announcing the withdrawal of the round £1 coin in January 2023, with the assistance of the Royal Mint. All the coins have the same composition and size as the corresponding British coins.

Depiction of Falkland coinage
£0.01	£0.02	£0.05
Gentoo penguin	Upland goose	Black-browed albatross
£0.10	£0.20	£0.50
South American sea lion	Sheep	Warrah
£1.00	£2.00	£2.00 edge
Falkland Islands coat of arms	Map of the Falkland Islands	

== Banknotes ==
Between 1899 and 1901, the government introduced notes for 5/- and 10/-, £1 and £5. 5/- notes were issued until 1916. Following decimalisation in 1971, the 10/- note of the preceding issue became the new 50-pence note, though it retained its old design. £10 notes were introduced in 1975, followed by £20 in 1984 and £50 in 1990. Banknotes in circulation are:

- £5 (red)
- £10 (green)
- £20 (brown)
- £50 (red, green and blue combination)

Falkland Islands' banknotes feature the same images, differing only in their respective denominations and corresponding colours. On the front side, all notes depict a portrait of Queen Elizabeth II, the Falklands' coat of arms, a small map of the islands, and images of two of the islands' main animals: penguins and sea lions. On the back, notes feature pictures of Christ Church Cathedral in Stanley and Government House, the official residence of the governor of the Falkland Islands.

Banknotes are printed by De la Rue plc on behalf of the Falkland Island Commissioners of Currency. In 2010 an order was placed for the printing of 200,000 £10 banknotes and for 200,000 £20 banknotes which would represent a supply of banknotes that would last for 15 to 20 years.

A shortage of £5 banknotes led to a public consultation on a new design of banknotes in 2024. New £5, £10, and £20 polymer banknotes entered into circulation on 14 August 2025, all with the same design featuring Charles III and illustrations of local wildlife (the black-browed albatross, king penguin, and pale maiden), as well as Steeple Jason Island. There are no plans for a new £50 banknote due to an adequate supply, and the older series of banknotes is expected to be withdrawn from circulation in 2026.

Current FKP exchange rates
From Google Finance:	AUD CAD CHF CNY EUR GBP HKD JPY USD ARS JPY USD
From Yahoo! Finance:	AUD CAD CHF CNY EUR GBP HKD JPY USD ARS JPY USD
From XE.com:	AUD CAD CHF CNY EUR GBP HKD JPY USD ARS JPY USD
From OANDA:	AUD CAD CHF CNY EUR GBP HKD JPY USD ARS JPY USD

== See also ==
- Economy of the Falkland Islands
