= Compendium of postage stamp issuers (To–Tz) =

Each article in this category is a collection of entries about several stamp issuers, presented in alphabetical order. The entries are formulated on the micro model and provide summary information about all known issuers.

See the Category:Compendium of postage stamp issuers page for details of the project.

== Tokelau ==
Dates
1948 –
Capital
Currency
(1948) 12 pence = 1 shilling; 20 shillings = 1 pound
(1967) 100 cents = 1 dollar
(1982) 100 sene (cents) = 1 tola (dollar)

Main Article Postage stamps and postal history of Tokelau

== Tolima ==
Dates
1870 – 1903
Currency
100 centavos = 1 peso

Refer
Colombian Territories

== Tonga ==
Dates
1886 –
Capital
Nukuʻalofa
Currency
(1886) 12 pence = 1 shilling; 20 shillings = 1 pound
(1967) 100 seniti = 1 pa'anga

Main Article Postage stamps and postal history of Tonga

== Tongking ==
Refer
Annam & Tongking

== Toypkia ==
Refer
Greek Post Offices in the Turkish Empire

== Transbaikal Province ==
Dates
1920 only
Capital
Chita
Currency
100 kopecks = 1 Russian ruble

Refer
Russian Civil War Issues

== Transcaucasian Federation ==
Dates
1923 – 1924
Capital
Tbilisi
Currency
100 kopecks = 1 Russian ruble

See also
Armenia;
Azerbaijan;
Georgia;
Union of Soviet Socialist Republics (USSR)

== Transjordan ==
Dates
1920 – 1949
Capital
Amman
Currency
1000 milliemes = 100 piastres = 1 pound

Refer
Jordan

== Transkei ==
One of the territories ( Bantustans ) set up by the South African government as part of its apartheid policy. Although the territory itself did not acquire international recognition, its stamps were valid for postage.

Dates
1977 – 1994
Capital
Mthatha
Currency
100 cents = 1 rand

Refer
South African Territories

== Transvaal ==
Dates
1869 – 1910
Capital
Pretoria
Currency
12 pence = 1 shilling; 20 shillings = 1 pound

Main Article Needed

Includes
Lydenburg;
New Republic;
Pietersburg;
Rustenburg;
Schweizer–Renecke;
South African Republic;
Volksrust;
Wolmaransstad

== Transylvania (Romanian Occupation) ==
Dates
1919 only
Currency
100 bani = 1 leu

Refer
Romanian Post Abroad

== Travancore ==
Dates
1888 – 1949
Capital
Trivandrum
Currency
16 cash = 1 chuckram; 28 chuckrams = 1 rupee

Refer
Indian Native States

See also
Travancore-Cochin

== Travancore-Cochin ==
Dates
1949 – 1951
Capital
Trivandrum
Currency
12 pies = 1 anna; 16 annas = 1 rupee

Refer
Indian Native States

See also
Cochin;
Travancore

== Trebizonde (Russian Post Office) ==
Dates
1909 – 1910
Currency
40 paras = 1 piastre

Refer
Russian Post Offices in the Turkish Empire

== Trengganu ==
Dates
1910 –
Capital
Kuala Trengganu
Currency
100 cents = 1 dollar

Main Article Needed

See also
Malaysia

== Trentino (Italian Occupation) ==
Dates
1918 – 1919
Currency
Austrian and Italian used concurrently

Refer
Italian Occupation Issues

== Trieste ==
Main Article Needed

Includes
Trieste (Allied Military Government);
Trieste (Yugoslav Military Government)

See also
Venezia Giulia & Istria

== Trieste (Allied Military Government) ==
Dates
1947 – 1954
Currency
100 centesimi = 1 lira

Refer
Trieste

== Trieste (Yugoslav Military Government) ==
Dates
1948 – 1954
Currency
(1948) 100 centesimi = 1 lira
(1949) 100 paras = 1 dinar

Refer
Trieste

== Trinidad ==
Dates
1851 – 1913
Capital
Port of Spain
Currency
12 pence = 1 shilling; 20 shillings = 1 pound

Refer
Trinidad & Tobago

== Trinidad and Tobago ==
Dates
1913 –
Capital
Port of Spain
Currency
(1913) 12 pence = 1 shilling; 20 shillings = 1 pound
(1935) 100 cents = 1 dollar

Main Article Postage stamps and postal history of Trinidad and Tobago

Includes
Tobago;
Trinidad

== Tripoli (Italian Post Office) ==
Dates
1909 – 1912
Currency
100 centesimi = 1 lira

Refer
Italian Post Offices in the Turkish Empire

== Tripolitania ==
Dates
1923 – 1943
Capital
Tripoli
Currency
100 centesimi = 1 lira

== Tripolitania (British Administration) ==
Dates
1950 – 1952
Currency
Military Administration Lire (MAL)

Refer
BA/BMA Issues

== Tripolitania (British Military Administration) ==
Dates
1948 – 1950
Currency
Military Administration Lire (MAL)

Refer
BA/BMA Issues

== Tripolitania (British Occupation) ==
Refer
Tripolitania (British Administration);
Tripolitania (British Military Administration)

== Tristan da Cunha ==
Dates
1952 –
Capital
Currency
(1952) 12 pence = 1 shilling; 20 shillings = 1 pound
(1961) 100 cents = 1 rand
(1963) 12 pence = 1 shilling; 20 shillings = 1 pound
(1971) 100 pence = 1 pound

Main Article Postage stamps and postal history of Tristan da Cunha

== Trucial States ==
Dates
1961 – 1972
Currency
100 naye paise = 1 rupee
Main Article
Postage stamps and postal history of the Trucial States
Includes
Ajman;
Fujeira;
Ras Al Khaima;
Sharjah;
Umm Al Qiwain
See also
Abu Dhabi;
British Postal Agencies in Eastern Arabia;
Dubai;
United Arab Emirates (UAE)

== Tsingtao ==
Refer
Kiautschou

== Tunisia ==
Dates
1888 –
Capital
Tunis
Currency
(1888) 100 centimes = 1 franc
(1959) 1000 milliemes = 1 dinar

Main Article Postage stamps and postal history of Tunisia

== Turkey ==
Dates
1863 –
Capital
Constantinople (to 1923);
Ankara (since 1923)
Currency
(1863) 40 paras = 1 piastre
(1926) 40 paras = 1 grush
(1929) 40 paras = 1 kurus
(1942) 100 paras = 1 kurus
(1949) 100 kurus = 1 lira

Main Article Postage stamps and postal history of Turkey

Includes
Compendium of postage stamp issuers (Al – Aq)#Angora (Ankara);
Thessaly (Turkish Occupation)

== Turkish Cypriot Posts ==
Dates
1974 –
Currency
(1974) 1000 mils = 1 pound
(1978) 100 kurus = 1 lira

Main Article Needed

== Turkish Empire (Foreign Post Offices) ==
Refer
Austro-Hungarian Post Offices in the Turkish Empire;
British Post Offices in the Turkish Empire;
Constantinople (Polish Post Office);
Egyptian Post Offices in the Turkish Empire;
French Post Offices in the Turkish Empire;
German Post Offices in the Turkish Empire;
German Post Offices in the Turkish Empire;
Italian Post Offices in the Turkish Empire;
Romanian Post Offices in the Turkish Empire;
Russian Post Offices in the Turkish Empire

== Turkmenistan ==
Dates
1992 –
Capital
Ashkabad
Currency
(1992) 100 kopecks = 1 Russian ruble
(1994) 100 tenge = 1 manat

Main Article Postage stamps and postal history of Turkmenistan

See also
Union of Soviet Socialist Republics (USSR)

== Turks Islands ==
Dates
1867 – 1900
Capital
Cockburn Town
Currency
12 pence = 1 shilling; 20 shillings = 1 pound

Refer
Turks & Caicos Islands

== Turks and Caicos Islands ==
Dates
1900 –
Capital
Cockburn Town (Grand Turk)
Currency
(1900) 12 pence = 1 shilling; 20 shillings = 1 pound (£)
(1969) 100 cents = 1 dollar

Main Article Postage stamps and postal history of the Turks and Caicos Islands

Includes
Caicos Islands;
Turks Islands

== Tuscany ==
Dates
1851 – 1860
Capital
Firenze (Florence)
Currency
(1851) 60 quattrini = 20 soldi = 12 crazie = 1 Tuscan lira
(1859) 1 Tuscan lira = 1 Italian lira

Refer
Italian States

== Tuva ==
Dates
1926 – 1944
Capital
Kyzyl
Currency
(1926) 100 kopecks = 1 Russian ruble
(1935) 100 kopecks = 1 tugrik
(1936) 100 kopecks = 1 aksha

Main Article Postage stamps and postal history of Tannu Tuva

See also
Union of Soviet Socialist Republics (USSR)

== Tuvalu ==
Dates
1976 –
Capital
Funafuti
Currency
100 cents = 1 dollar

Main Article Postage stamps and postal history of Tuvalu

See also
Gilbert & Ellice Islands

== Bibliography ==
- Stanley Gibbons Ltd, Europe and Colonies 1970, Stanley Gibbons Ltd, 1969
- Stanley Gibbons Ltd, various catalogues
- Stuart Rossiter & John Flower, The Stamp Atlas, W H Smith, 1989
- XLCR Stamp Finder and Collector's Dictionary, Thomas Cliffe Ltd, c.1960
