= Centesimo =

Centesimo (Italian: centesimo; pl.: centesimi; Spanish: centésimo; pl.: centésimos) is a currency unit equivalent to cent, derived from the Latin centesimus meaning "hundredth". In Italy it was the 1/100 division of the Italian lira.

Currencies that have centesimo as subunits include:

Circulating

- Euro cent (in Italian, see Language and the euro)
- Panamanian balboa
- Swiss franc (in Italian, see Rappen)

Obsolete

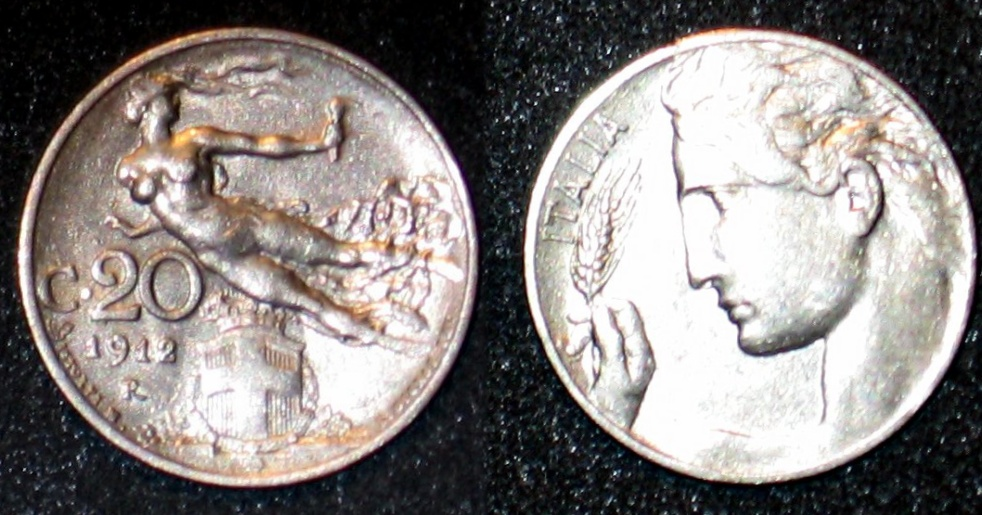
20 centesimi, 1912

- Boliviano (1864–1963)
- Chilean escudo
- Dominican franco
- Eritrean tallero
- Italian lira
- Lombardo-Venetian lira
- Neapolitan lira
- Papal lira
- Paraguayan peso
- Parman lira
- Sammarinese lira
- Sardinian lira
- Somalo
- Vatican lira
- Uruguayan peso (retired 2010)
