= Compendium of postage stamp issuers (X–Y) =

Each "article" in this category is a collection of entries about several stamp issuers, presented in alphabetical order. The entries are formulated on the micro model and so provide summary information about all known issuers.

See the Category:Compendium of postage stamp issuers page for details of the project.

== Yanoan ==
Refer
French Indian Settlements

== Yemen ==
Main Article Postage stamps and postal history of Yemen

Includes
Southern Yemen;
Yemen Arab Republic;
Yemen (Mutawakelite Kingdom);
Yemen PDR;
Yemen Republic

See also
Aden Protectorate States

== Yemen Arab Republic ==
Dates
1963–1990
Capital
Sanaa
Currency
(1963) 40 bogaches = 1 imadi
(1964) 40 bogaches = 1 rial
(1975) 100 fils = 1 riyal

Refer
Yemen

== Yemen (Mutawakelite Kingdom) ==
Dates
1926–1970
Capital
Sanaa
Currency
(1963) 40 bogaches = 1 imadi
(1964) 40 bogaches = 1 rial

Refer
Yemen

== Yemen (People's Democratic Republic) ==
Dates
1971–1990
Capital
Aden
Currency
1000 fils = 1 dinar

Refer
Yemen

== Yemen Republic ==
Dates
1990–
Capital
Sanaa
Currency
100 fils = 1 rial (north)
1000 fils = 1 dinar (south)

Refer
Yemen

== Yokohama ==
Refer
Japan (French Post Offices)

== Yugoslavia ==
Dates
1944–1992
Capital
Belgrade
Currency
100 paras = 1 dinar

Main Article
Postage stamps and postal history of Yugoslavia

Includes
Srba Hrvata Slovena;
Yugoslavia (Kingdom);
Yugoslavia (Democratic Federation);
Yugoslav Government in Exile

See also
Bosnia & Herzegovina;
Croatia;
Macedonia;
Montenegro;
Serbia;
Slovenia

== Yugoslavia (Kingdom) ==
Dates
1929–1941
Capital
Belgrade
Currency
100 paras = 1 dinar

Refer
Yugoslavia

== Yugoslavia (Democratic Federation) ==
Dates
1944–1945
Capital
Belgrade
Currency
100 paras = 1 dinar

Refer
Yugoslavia

== Yugoslav Government in Exile ==
Dates
1943–1945
Currency
100 paras = 1 dinar

Refer
Yugoslavia

== Yugoslav Military Government in Trieste ==
Refer
Trieste

== Yugoslav Military Government in Venezia Giulia ==
Refer
Venezia Giulia & Istria (Yugoslav Military Government)

== Yugoslav Occupation Issues ==
Refer
Fiume;
Trieste;
Venezia Giulia & Istria

== Yunnan ==
Dates
1926–1933
Capital
Mengtse
Currency
100 cents = 1 dollar

Refer
Chinese Provinces

== Yunnanfu (Indochinese Post Office) ==
Dates
1903–1922
Currency
100 cents = 1 dollar

Refer
China (Indochinese Post Offices)

== Yunnansen ==
Refer
Yunnanfu (Indochinese Post Office)

== Bibliography ==
- Stanley Gibbons Ltd, Europe and Colonies 1970, Stanley Gibbons Ltd, 1969
- Stanley Gibbons Ltd, various catalogues
- Stuart Rossiter & John Flower, The Stamp Atlas, W H Smith, 1989
- XLCR Stamp Finder and Collector's Dictionary, Thomas Cliffe Ltd, c.1960
