= Compendium of postage stamp issuers (J) =

Each "article" in this category is a collection of entries about several stamp issuers, presented in alphabetical order. The entries are formulated on the micro model and so provide summary information about all known issuers.

See the Category:Compendium of postage stamp issuers page for details of the project.

== Jaffa (Russian Post Office) ==
Dates
1909 – 1910
Currency
40 paras = 1 piastre

Refer
Russian Post Offices in the Turkish Empire

== Jaipur ==
Dates
1904 – 1948
Currency
12 pies = 1 anna; 16 annas = 1 rupee

Refer
Indian Native States

== Jamaica ==
Dates
1860 –
Capital
Kingston
Currency
(1860) 12 pence = 1 shilling; 20 shillings = 1 pound
(1969) 100 cents = 1 dollar

Main Article
Postage stamps and postal history of Jamaica

== Jammu & Kashmir ==
Dates
1866 – 1894
Capital
Srinagar
Currency
12 pies = 1 anna; 16 annas = 1 rupee

Refer
Indian Native States

== Janina ==
Refer
Jannina (Italian Post Office)

== Jannina (Italian Post Office) ==
Dates
1909 – 1911
Currency
40 paras = 1 piastre

Refer
Italian Post Offices in the Turkish Empire

== Japan ==
Dates
1871 –
Capital
Tokyo
Currency
(1871) 100 mon = 1 sen
(1872) 10 rin = 1 sen; 100 sen = 1 yen

Main Article
Postage stamps and postal history of Japan

== Japan (British Commonwealth Occupation) ==
Dates
1946 – 1949
Currency
12 pence = 1 shilling; 20 shillings = 1 pound

Refer
British Occupation Issues

== Japan (American Post Offices) ==
Refer
US Post Offices in Japan

== Japan (British Post Offices) ==
Dates
1859 – 1879
Currency
100 cents = 1 dollar

Refer
British Post Offices Abroad

== Japan (French Post Offices) ==
Dates
1865 – 1880
Currency
100 centimes = 1 franc

Refer
French Post Offices Abroad

== Japanese Naval Control Area ==
Dates
1942 – 1943
Currency
100 cents = 1 gulden

Refer
Japanese Occupation Issues

== Japanese Occupation Issues ==
Main Article Needed

Includes
Brunei (Japanese Occupation);
Burma (Japanese Occupation);
Hong Kong (Japanese Occupation);
Japanese Naval Control Area;
Japanese Taiwan (Formosa);
Java (Japanese Occupation);
Kelantan (Japanese Occupation);
Kwangtung (Japanese Occupation);
Malaya (Japanese Occupation);
Mengkiang (Japanese Occupation);
Nangking & Shanghai (Japanese Occupation);
Netherlands Indies (Japanese Occupation);
North Borneo (Japanese Occupation);
North China (Japanese Occupation);
Philippines (Japanese Occupation);
Sarawak (Japanese Occupation);
Sumatra (Japanese Occupation)

== Japanese Post Offices Abroad ==
Main Article Needed

Includes
China (Japanese Post Offices);
Korea (Japanese Post Offices)

== Japanese Taiwan (Formosa) ==
Dates
1945 only
Capital
Taipei
Currency
10 rin = 1 sen; 100 sen = 1 yen

Refer
Japanese Occupation Issues

== Jasdan ==
Dates
1942 only
Currency
12 pies = 1 anna; 16 annas = 1 rupee

Refer
Indian Native States

== Java (Japanese Occupation) ==
Dates
1943 – 1945
Currency
100 sen (cents) = 1 rupee (gulden)

Refer
Japanese Occupation Issues

== Jeend ==
Refer
Jind

== Jeind ==
Refer
Jind

== Jersey ==
Dates
1941 –
Capital
St Helier
Currency
(1941) 12 pence = 1 shilling; 20 shillings = 1 pound
(1970) 100 pence = 1 pound

Main Article
Postage stamps and postal history of Jersey

See also
Great Britain (Regional Issues)

== Jerusalem (Italian Post Office) ==
Dates
1909 – 1911
Currency
40 paras = 1 piastre

Refer
Italian Post Offices in the Turkish Empire

== Jerusalem (Russian Post Office) ==
Dates
1909 – 1910
Currency
40 paras = 1 piastre

Refer
Russian Post Offices in the Turkish Empire

== Jhalawar ==
Dates
1887 – 1900
Currency
4 pies = 1 anna

Refer
Indian Native States

== Jhind ==
Refer
Jind

== Jind ==
Dates
1874 – 1885
Currency
12 pies = 1 anna; 16 annas = 1 rupee

Refer
Jind in Indian Convention states

== Johor ==
Refer
Johore

== Johore ==
Dates
1876 –
Capital
Johor Bahru
Currency
100 cents = 1 dollar

Main Article Needed

See also
Malaysia

== Jordan ==
Dates
1920 –
Capital
Amman
Currency
(1920) 1000 milliemes = 100 piastres = 1 Egyptian pound
(1927) 1000 mils = 1 Palestine pound
(1950) 1000 fils = 1 dinar

Main Article
Postage stamps and postal history of Jordan

Includes
Palestine (Jordanian rule);
Transjordan

== Jubaland ==
Dates
1925 – 1926
Capital
Kismayu
Currency
100 centesimi = 1 lira

Main Article Needed
Postage stamps and postal history of Oltre Giuba

Refer
Italian Trans-Juba

== Jugoslavia ==
Refer
Yugoslavia

== Junagadh ==
Refer
Soruth (Saurashtra)

== Bibliography ==
- Stanley Gibbons Ltd, Europe and Colonies 1970, Stanley Gibbons Ltd, 1969
- Stanley Gibbons Ltd, various catalogues
- Stuart Rossiter & John Flower, The Stamp Atlas, W H Smith, 1989
- XLCR Stamp Finder and Collector's Dictionary, Thomas Cliffe Ltd, c.1960
