= Compendium of postage stamp issuers (Ki–Kz) =

Each "article" in this category is a collection of entries about several stamp issuers, presented in alphabetical order. The entries are formulated on the micro model and so provide summary information about all known issuers.

See the Category:Compendium of postage stamp issuers page for details of the project.

== Kiaochow ==
Refer
Kiautschou

== Kiautschou ==
Dates
1901–1914
Currency
(1901) 100 pfennige = 1 mark
(1905) 100 cents = 1 dollar

Refer
German Colonies

== King Edward VII Land ==
Dates
1908 only
Currency
12 pence = 1 shilling; 20 shillings = 1 pound

Refer
New Zealand Territories

== Kingdom of Serbs Croats & Slovenes ==
Refer
Yugoslavia

== Kingdom of Yugoslavia ==
Refer
Yugoslavia

== Kionga ==
Dates
1916 only
Currency
100 centavos = 1 escudo

Refer
Mozambique Territories

== Kirgizistan ==
Refer
Kyrgyzstan

== Kiribati ==
Dates
1979 –
Capital
Tarawa
Currency
100 cents = 1 dollar

Main Article
Postage stamps and postal history of Kiribati

Includes
Gilbert Islands

See also
Gilbert & Ellice Islands

== Kirin & Heilungkiang ==
Dates
1927–1931
Capital
Harbin
Currency
100 cents = 1 dollar

Refer
Chinese Provinces

== Kishangarh ==
Dates
1899–1947
Currency
12 pies = 1 anna; 16 annas = 1 rupee

Refer
Indian Native States

== Kithyra (Cythera) ==
Refer
Ionian Islands

== Klaipėda ==
Dates
1923 only
Currency
(1923) 100 pfennige = 1 mark
(1923) 100 centu = 1 litas

Main Article Needed

See also
Lithuania;
Memel (French Administration)

== Kolchak Government (Siberia) ==
Dates
1919–1920
Capital
Omsk
Currency
100 kopecks = 1 Russian ruble

Refer
Russian Civil War Issues

== Komotini ==
Refer
Gumultsina

== Korce (Koritza) ==
Dates
1917–1919
Capital
Koritza
Currency
100 centimes = 1 franc

Refer
French Occupation Issues

== Korea (Empire) ==
Dates
1884–1910
Capital
Seoul
Currency
(1884) 10 mons = 1 poon
(1899) 1000 re = 100 cheun = 1 won

Main Article
Postage stamps and postal history of Korea

== Korea (Indian Custodian Forces) ==
Dates
1953 only
Currency
12 pies = 1 anna; 16 annas = 1 rupee

Refer
Indian Overseas Forces

== Korea (Japanese Post Offices) ==
Dates
1900–1901
Currency
10 rin = 1 sen; 100 sen = 1 yen

Refer
Japanese Post Offices Abroad

== Koritza ==
Refer
Korce (Koritza)

== Korytza ==
Refer
Epirus

== Kos ==
Dates
1912–1932
Capital
Kos
Currency
100 centesimi = 1 lira

Refer
Aegean Islands (Dodecanese)

== Kotor ==
Refer
Dalmatia (German Occupation)

== Kouang-Tcheou ==
Dates
1898–1943
Currency
(1898) 100 centimes = 1 franc
(1919) 100 cents = 1 piastre

Refer
China (Indochinese Post Offices)

== Krk ==
Refer
Veglia

== Kuban Territory ==
Dates
1918–1920
Capital
Krasnodar
Currency
100 kopecks = 1 Russian ruble

Refer
Russian Civil War Issues

== K-u-K Feldpost ==
Refer
Austro-Hungarian Military Post

== Kupa ==
Refer
Fiume & Kupa Zone (Italian Occupation)

== Kuwait ==
Dates
1923 –
Capital
Kuwait City
Currency
(1923) 12 pies = 1 anna, 16 annas = 1 rupee
(1957) 100 naye paise = 1 rupee
(1961) 1000 fils = 1 dinar

Main article
Postage stamps and postal history of Kuwait

See also
British Postal Agencies in Eastern Arabia

== Kwangchow ==
Refer
Kouang-Tcheou

== Kwangtung (Japanese Occupation) ==
Dates
1942–1945
Currency
100 cents = 1 dollar

Refer
Japanese Occupation Issues

== Kwidzyn ==
Refer
Marienwerder

== Kyrgyzstan ==
Dates
1992 –
Capital
Bishkek (formerly known as Frunze)
Currency
(1992) 100 kopecks = 1 Russian ruble
(1993) 100 tyin = 1 som

Main article
Postage stamps and postal history of Kyrgyzstan
See also
Union of Soviet Socialist Republics (USSR)

== Bibliography ==
- Stanley Gibbons Ltd, Europe and Colonies 1970, Stanley Gibbons Ltd, 1969
- Stanley Gibbons Ltd, various catalogues
- Stuart Rossiter & John Flower, The Stamp Atlas, W H Smith, 1989
- XLCR Stamp Finder and Collector's Dictionary, Thomas Cliffe Ltd, c.1960
