= Compendium of postage stamp issuers (Ce–Ch) =

Each "article" in this category is a collection of entries about several stamp issuers, presented in alphabetical order. The entries are formulated on the micro model and so provide summary information about all known issuers.

See the Category:Compendium of postage stamp issuers page for details of the project.

== Celebes ==
Refer
Japanese Naval Control Area

== Central African Empire ==
Dates
1977 – 1979
Capital
Bangui
Currency
100 centimes = 1 franc

Refer
Central African Republic

== Central African Republic ==
Formerly Ubangi–Chari and in French Equatorial Africa. Was known as Central African Empire from 1977 to 1979.

Dates
1959 –
Capital
Bangui
Currency
100 centimes = 1 franc

Main Article
Postage stamps and postal history of the Central African Republic

Includes
Central African Empire

See also
French Equatorial Africa;
Oubangui–Chari

== Central China (People's Post) ==
Regional issues by Chinese People's Republic.

Dates
1949 – 1950
Currency
100 cents = 1 dollar

Refer
CPR Regional Issues

== Central Lithuania (Polish Occupation) ==
The territory was absorbed by Poland in 1922 and became part of the USSR in 1939.

Dates
1920 – 1922
Currency
100 fenigow = 1 mark

Refer
Polish Post Abroad

== Cephalonia and Ithaca (Italian Occupation) ==
Italian occupation forces issued Greek stamps overprinted Occupazione Militare Italiana isole Cefalonia e Itaca. These were replaced by a general issue for all the Ionian Islands.

Dates
1941 only
Currency
100 lepta = 1 drachma (Greek)

Refer
Italian Occupation Issues

See also
Ionian Islands (Italian Occupation)

== Ceylon ==
Dates
1857 – 1972
Capital
Colombo
Currency
100 cents = 1 rupee

Main Article

See also
Sri Lanka

== Chad ==
Used stamps of French Equatorial Africa 1937 – 1959.

Dates
1959 –
Capital
Ndjamena
Currency
100 centimes = 1 franc

Includes
Chad (French Colony)

See also
French Equatorial Africa

== Chad (French Colony) ==
Used stamps of French Equatorial Africa 1937 – 1959.

Dates
1922 – 1937
Capital
Fort Lamy
Currency
100 centimes = 1 franc

Refer
Chad

== Chalce ==
Refer
Khalki

== Chamba ==
Dates
1886 – 1948
Currency
12 pies = 1 anna; 16 annas = 1 rupee

Refer
Chamba in Indian Convention states

== Chandernagore ==
Refer
French Indian Settlements

== Channel Islands ==
British territory since the Norman Conquest, having previously been part of the Duchy of Normandy. Alderney, Herm and Sark are in the Bailiwick of Guernsey while Jersey has separate administration. During WWII, the islands were occupied by Germany from 30 June 1940 to 9 May 1945.

British stamps were used 1840–1940. These can only be distinguished by postmark. During the occupation period, local issues were used in Guernsey and Jersey after British stocks ran out. British stamps were again in use 1945–1958. On 10 May 1948, the only general issue for the whole Channel Islands was introduced. British Regional issues were used from 1958 till 1 October 1969 when Guernsey and Jersey began separate postal administration and issued their own stamps. Alderney began local issues in 1983.

The 1948 general issue commemorated the third anniversary of the liberation. There were two values: 1d and 2½d. The stamps were also valid throughout Britain.

Dates
1948 only
Capital
St Helier (Jersey); St Peter Port (Guernsey)
Currency
12 pence = 1 shilling; 20 shillings = 1 Jersey pound/Guernsey pound

Main Article

See also
Alderney;
Great Britain (Regional Issues);
Guernsey;
Jersey

== Charkari ==
Dates
1894 – 1940
Currency
12 pies = 1 anna; 16 annas = 1 rupee

Refer
Indian Native States

== Chile ==
Dates
1853 –
Capital
Santiago
Currency
(1853) 100 centavos = 1 peso
(1960) 10 milesimos = 1 centesimo; 100 centesimos = 1 escudo
(1975) 100 centesimos = 1 peso

Main Article Postage stamps and postal history of Chile

Includes
Tierra del Fuego

== China ==
Refer
Chinese Empire;
Chinese Nationalist Republic (Taiwan);
Chinese People's Republic;
Chinese Republic;
Shanghai;
Taiwan

== China (British Post Offices) ==
The offices were in Amoy (opened 1844), Canton (1844), Foochow (1844), Ningpo (1844), Shanghai (1844), Swatow (1861), Hankow (1872), Kiungchow (1873), Tientsin (1882) and Chefoo (1903). All closed on 30 November 1922. The stamps continued to be used until 1930 in Wei–Hei–Wei, a colony which was leased to Britain from 1898 to 1 October 1930 and was then returned to China. The stamps were Hong Kong types overprinted CHINA.

Dates
1917 – 1930
Currency
100 cents = 1 dollar

Refer
British Post Offices Abroad

== China (British Railway Administration) ==
The Chinese half cent stamp of 1898 was surcharged 5 cents and overprinted BRA. The stamps were used for collection of a late letter fee on letters posted in a mail van on British operated railways.

Dates
1901 only
Currency
100 cents = 1 dollar

Refer
British Post Offices Abroad

== China Expeditionary Force ==
The China Expeditionary Force was an international army sent to China in 1900. It relieved Peking and suppressed the Boxer Rebellion. It continued to police northern China until 1906, though a small contingent remained after that.

Indian stamps overprinted CEF were used at various foreign post offices throughout China until 25 November 1923.

Dates
1900 – 1923
Currency
12 pies = 1 anna; 16 annas = 1 rupee

Refer
Indian Overseas Forces

== China (French Post Offices) ==
This refers to general issues for all French and Indo-Chinese offices in China. Various stamps of France or Indo-China were either overprinted or inscribed CHINE. Several offices had individual issues. Prior to 1894, stamps of France were used.

The offices were at Shanghai (opened November 1862), Tientsin (16 March 1889), Chefoo (November 1898), Hankow (1898), Peking (December 1900), Amoy (January 1902), Foochow (1902) and Ningpo (1902). All closed on 31 December 1922.

Dates
1894 – 1922
Currency
(1894) 100 centimes = 1 franc
(1907) 100 cents = 1 piastre

Refer
French Post Offices Abroad

== China (German Post Offices) ==
This refers to general issues for all German post offices in China. Various stamps of Germany were either overprinted or inscribed CHINA. Prior to 1898, stamps of Germany were used.

The offices were at Shanghai (opened 16 August 1886), Tientsin (October 1889), Chefoo (1 June 1892), Amoy, Canton, Foochow, Hankow, Ichang, Nanking, Peking, Swatow and Chinkiang. The last nine were opened after 1900 but dates are unknown. All offices closed on 17 March 1917.

Dates
1898 – 1917
Currency
(1898) 100 pfennige = 1 Reichsmark
(1905) 100 cents = 1 dollar

Refer
German Post Offices Abroad

== China (Indochinese Post Offices) ==
Dates
1900 – 1922
Currency
(1900) 100 centimes = 1 franc
(1919) 100 cents = 1 piastre

Main Article

Includes
Canton (Indochinese Post Office);
Hoi-Hao (Indochinese Post Office);
Kouang-Tcheou;
Mong-Tseu (Indochinese Post Office);
Pakhoi (Indochinese Post Office);
Tchongking (Indochinese Post Office);
Yunnanfu (Indochinese Post Office)

== China (Italian Post Offices) ==
Italy had two post offices in China: at Peking (Pechino) and Tientsin. Both used Italian stamps particular to the office. The offices were open from September 1917 to 31 December 1922 and were for use by diplomatic and military personnel.

Refer
Pechino (Italian Post Office);
Tientsin (Italian Post Office)

== China (Japanese Occupation) ==
Refer
Japanese Occupation Issues;
Kwangtung (Japanese Occupation);
Mengkiang (Japanese Occupation);
Manchukuo;
Nangking & Shanghai (Japanese Occupation);
North China (Japanese Occupation)

== China (Japanese Post Offices) ==
Stamps of Japan were issued at the various offices with an overprint in Japanese characters which denoted Japanese Agencies. From 15 April 1876 until 31 December 1899, stamps of Japan were used without overprint.

The main office was at Shanghai (opened 15 April 1876). Others were at Chefoo, Chingkiang, Foochow, Hangchow, Kiukiang, Newchang (now Yingkow), Mingoo, Shansi, Soochow and Tientsin. All offices closed in 1922.

Dates
1900 – 1922
Currency
10 rin = 1 sen; 100 sen = 1 yen

Refer
Japanese Post Offices Abroad

== China (Russian Post Offices) ==
The Russian offices were at Peking (opened 1870), Kalgan (1870), Tientsin (1870), Urga (Mongolia, 1870), Shanghai (1897), Chefoo (1897), Hankow (1897), Port Arthur (1899–1904) and Dairen (1899–1904). All were closed in 1920.

Russian stamps without overprint were used from 1870. From 1899, Russian stamps were overprinted with Cyrillic KHTAH (i.e., China). All stamps were inscribed in Russian currency but the offices accepted Chinese payment for them at the rate of 1 Chinese cent to 1 Russian kopeck.

Dates
1899 – 1920
Currency
(1899) 100 kopecks = 1 Russian ruble
(1917) 100 cents = 1 dollar

Refer
Russian Post Offices Abroad

== Chinese Empire ==
Dates
1878 – 1912
Capital
Peking (Beijing)
Currency
(1878) 100 candarins = 1 tael
(1897) 100 cents = 1 dollar

Includes
Tibet (Chinese Post Offices)

See also
Shanghai

== Chinese Nationalist Republic (Taiwan) ==
Stamps are inscribed REPUBLIC OF CHINA.

Dates
1949 – 2007
Capital
Taipei
Currency
100 sen = 1 dollar

See also
Taiwan

Main Article

== Chinese People's Republic ==
General issues were concurrent with regional issues 1949 – 1951 and then superseded them.

Dates
1949 –
Capital
Beijing (Peking)
Currency
(1949) 100 cents = 1 dollar
(1955) 100 feu = 1 yuan

See also
CPR Regional Issues

== Chinese Post Offices ==
Refer
Tibet (Chinese Post Offices)

== Chinese Provinces ==
Main Article

Includes
Kirin & Heilungkiang;
North Eastern Provinces;
Sinkiang;
Szechwan;
Yunnan

See also
CPR Regional Issues;
Manchukuo

== Chinese Republic ==
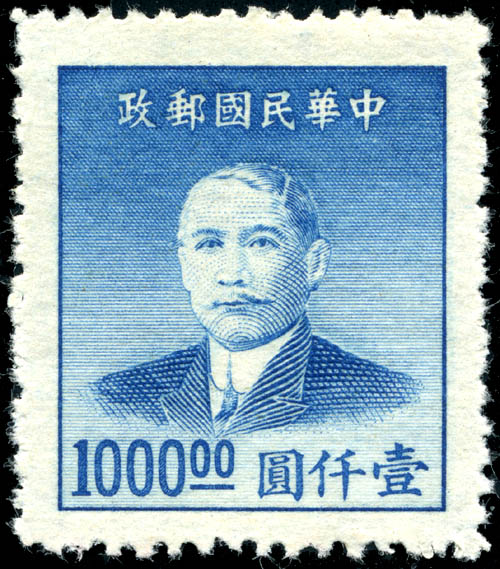
A 1949 stamp depicting Sun Yat-sen

Dates
1912 – 1949
Capital
Peking (Beijing)
Currency
100 cents = 1 dollar

== Chios ==
Refer
Khios

== Christmas Island ==
Christmas Island was discovered by Captain William Mynors on Christmas Day 1643 and annexed by Britain in 1888. It was transferred to Australia in 1958 and is now part of Northern Territory.

Dates
1958 –
Capital
Flying Fish Cove
Currency
(1958) 100 cents = 1 Malaysian dollar
(1968) 100 cents = 1 Australian dollar

Main article
Postage stamps and postal history of Christmas Island

== Chungking ==
Refer
Tchongking (Indochinese Post Office)

== Bibliography ==
- Stanley Gibbons Ltd, Europe and Colonies 1970, Stanley Gibbons Ltd, 1969
- Stanley Gibbons Ltd, various catalogues
- Stuart Rossiter & John Flower, The Stamp Atlas, W H Smith, 1989
- XLCR Stamp Finder and Collector's Dictionary, Thomas Cliffe Ltd, c.1960
