= Compendium of postage stamp issuers (Aa–Al) =

Each "article" in this category is in fact a collection of entries about several stamp issuers, presented in alphabetical order. The entries themselves are formulated on the micro model and so provide summary information about all known issuers.

See the Category:Compendium of postage stamp issuers page for details of the project.

== A&T ==
Overprint on French Colonial Commerce types of Annam and Tongking issued on 21 January 1888. These stamps also carried a surcharge of 1 or 5 centimes.

Refer
Annam & Tongking

== Abu Dhabi ==
Formerly an independent sheikhdom, Abu Dhabi is now the capital and second largest city of the United Arab Emirates. It issued its own stamps when there was a British postal agency in the sheikhdom. The agency was opened on Das Island in December 1960 and in Abu Dhabi City on 30 March 1963. Issues were discontinued when Abu Dhabi joined the United Arab Emirates.

Dates
1964–1972
Capital
Abu Dhabi City
Currency
(1964) 100 naye paise = 1 rupee
(1966) 1000 fils = 1 dinar
Main article
Postage stamps and postal history of Abu Dhabi, List of postage stamps of Abu Dhabi
See also
British Postal Agencies in Eastern Arabia;
Trucial States;
United Arab Emirates

== Abyssinia ==
Historical name for Ethiopia.

Refer
Ethiopia

== ACCP ==
Cyrillic for Azerbaijani Soviet Socialist Republic which was sometimes used as an inscription.

Refer
Azerbaijan

== Açores ==
AÇORES (Portuguese spelling) is the inscription on all Azores stamps.

Refer
Azores (Acores)

== Aden ==
A seaport in Yemen that was occupied by the British in 1839 and administered as a colony until 1963, its main purpose being as a coaling station for British shipping going to and from India via the Suez Canal. Originally governed as part of British India, it became a Crown Colony in 1937.

Dates
1937–1963
Capital
Aden Town
Currency
(1937) 16 annas = 1 rupee
(1951) 100 cents = 1 shilling
Main article
Postage stamps and postal history of Aden
See also
Aden Protectorate States

== Aden Protectorate States ==
Collective name for various states in the Hadhramaut region of southern Arabia, now part of the Republic of Yemen.

Main article
Postage stamps and postal history of the Aden Protectorate States
Includes
Kathiri State of Seiyun;
Mahra Sultanate of Qishn and Socotra;
Qu'aiti State in Hadhramaut;
Qu'aiti State of Shihr and Mukalla;
South Arabian Federation;
Upper Yafa
See also
Aden;
Southern Yemen

== Adélie Land ==
Adélie Land (Terre Adélie) is a French territory on the Antarctic mainland.

Refer
French Southern and Antarctic Territories

== Adrianople (Edirne) ==
The Treaty of Sèvres (1920) gave Greece a mandate for Eastern Thrace, including Adrianople. Turkish stamps in Adrianople were overprinted High Commission of Thrace and surcharged. Adrianople was returned to Turkey by the Treaty of Lausanne in 1922 and is now called Edirne.

Dates
1920–1922
Currency
100 lepta = 1 drachma (Greek)
Refer
Thrace
See also
Eastern Thrace;
Greek Occupation Issues

== AEF ==
Acronym for Afrique Equatoriale Française which was sometimes used as an inscription.

Refer
French Equatorial Africa

== Aegean Islands (Dodecanese) ==
Several Greek islands (the Dodecanese) off the coast of Asia Minor that were occupied by Italy in May 1912 and then ceded to Turkey in 1920. The islands were all restored to Greece on 15 September 1947.

Dates
1912–1945
Capital
Rodhos (Rhodes Town)
Currency
100 centesimi = 1 lira (Italian)
Main article
Postage stamps and postal history of the Aegean Islands
Includes
Astypalaea;
Castelrosso (Kastellórizo);
Kalimnos;
Karpathos;
Kasos;
Khalki;
Kos;
Leros;
Lipsos;
Nisyros;
Patmos;
Rhodes;
Syme;
Telos
See also
Dodecanese Islands (Greek Occupation);
Greek Occupation Issues;
Middle East Forces (MEF)

== Afars and Issas ==
Former French colony that is now Djibouti.

Refer
French Territory of Afars & Issas

== Afghanistan ==
Landlocked state of central Asia, formerly a kingdom and latterly an Islamic republic.

Dates
1870 –
Capital
Kabul
Currency
(1870) 3 abasi = 1 rupee
(1920) 60 paisa = 1 rupee
(1926) 100 pouls = 1 afghani
Main article
Postage stamps and postal history of Afghanistan

== Africa (Portuguese Colonies) ==
A general issue for all Portuguese colonies in Africa and the Atlantic.

Dates
1898 only
Currency
1000 réis = 1 mil réis
Main article
Postage stamps and postal history of the Portuguese colonies in Africa
See also
Angola;
Azores;
Cape Verde Islands;
Madeira;
Mozambique;
Portuguese Congo;
Portuguese Guinea;
Sao Tome e Principe

== Africa Occidental Espanola ==
Inscription on stamps of Spanish West Africa.

Refer
Spanish West Africa

== Africa Orientale Italiane ==
Inscription on stamps of Italian East Africa.

Refer
Italian East Africa

== Afrique Equatoriale Française ==
Inscription on stamps of French Equatorial Africa.

Refer
French Equatorial Africa

== Afrique Occidentale Française ==
Inscription on stamps of French West Africa.

Refer
French West Africa

== Aitutaki ==
Aitutaki is part of the Cook Islands, and lies about 140 miles (230 km) north of Rarotonga. It consists of many volcanic and coral islets around a lagoon. The total land area is only 7 square miles (18 km^{2}). Access by sea is via an offshore anchorage with boat passage to Arutunga. There is also an airstrip which was built in WW2 by American forces. The population, less than 2500, is mainly Polynesian.

The 1903–1932 issues were New Zealand stamps with an overprint of AITUTAKI. Stamps of the Cook Islands were used 1932–1972 without overprint. Local issues began in 1972.

Dates
1972 –
Capital
Arutunga
Currency
100 cents = 1 dollar
Main article
Postage stamps and postal history of Aitutaki
Includes
Aitutaki (New Zealand Administration)
See also
Cook Islands;
New Zealand

== Aitutaki (New Zealand Administration) ==
Early stamp issues in Aitutaki were New Zealand types with an overprint.

Dates
1903–1932
Capital
Arutunga
Currency
12 pence = 1 shilling; 20 shillings = 1 pound
Refer
Aitutaki

== Ajman ==
One of the Trucial States which became the United Arab Emirates in 1972, Ajman was one of the most notorious sources of stamps that had dubious postal connections. Few, if any, Ajman stamps are of interest and all issues during the 1967–72 period must be regarded as non-postal.

Dates
1964–1967
Currency
(1964) 100 naye paise = 1 rupee
(1967) 100 dirhams = 1 riyal
Refer
Trucial States

== Åland Islands ==
Åland is an autonomous province of Finland. It is a group of islands in the Baltic Sea at the mouth of the Gulf of Bothnia.

Separate issues began in 1984 although stamps of Finland continued to be valid. From 1 Jan 1993, Åland began its own postal administration and Finnish stamps ceased to have validity there.

Dates
1984 –
Capital
Mariehamn
Currency
100 penni = 1 markka
Main article
Postage stamps and postal history of the Åland Islands
See also
Finland

== Alaouites ==
Alaouites (Alawi) is a district of Syria lying on the coast between Hatay and Lebanon. It was formerly part of the Turkish Empire but was placed under a French mandate in 1920. It became an independent republic and was renamed Latakia (after the capital) in 1930. On 28 February 1937, it was incorporated into Syria.

Stamps of France were issued in 1925 with overprint ALAOUITES. These were soon superseded by stamps of Syria bearing the same overprint. In July 1931, stamps of Syria were issued with overprint LATTAQUIE. Since 1 March 1937, stamps of Syria without overprint have been in constant use.

Dates
1925–1930
Capital
Latakia
Currency
100 centimes = 1 piastre
Main article
Postage stamps and postal history of Alaouites
Includes
Ile Rouad;
Latakia
See also
Syria

== Alaska ==
Largest state of the USA but separated from the rest by Canada. Discovered by Vitus Bering in 1741, it was first settled by Russia in 1744. The USA purchased the territory in 1867 for $7.2 million at a penny an acre. Alaska was admitted to the Union on 3 January 1959 as the 49th state.

There was no postal service under Russian ownership. Alaska has used stamps of the USA only.

Capital
Juneau
Refer
United States of America

== Alawi ==
The State of the Alawi, called Alaouites in French, had a separate existence between the World Wars but is now part of Syria. It was a coastal enclave between Hatay and Lebanon.

Refer
Alaouites

== Albania ==
A coastal republic on the Adriatic Sea in south-east Europe which used stamps of Turkey from 1870 to 1913.

Dates
1913 –
Capital
Tirana
Currency
(1913) 40 paras = 1 piastre (or grosch)
(1913) 100 qintar = 1 franc
(1947) 100 qintar = 1 lek
(1965) 100 qintar = 10 old leks = 1 new lek
Main article
Postage stamps and postal history of Albania
See also
Durazzo (Italian Post Office);
German Occupation Issues (World War II);
Greek Occupation Issues;
Italian Occupation Issues;
Italian Post Offices in the Turkish Empire;
Korce (Koritza);
Scutari (Italian Post Office);
Valona (Italian Post Office)

== Albania (German Occupation) ==
Albania was occupied by German forces after the fall of Italy in the Second World War. Relevant stamps are catalogue nos 389–408 of Albania.

Dates
1943–1944
Currency
100 qintar = 1 franc
Refer
German Occupation Issues (World War II)

== Albania (Greek Occupation) ==
Following Italy's abortive invasion of Greece in 1940, Greek forces occupied much of southern Albania until driven back by the German army which reinstated Italian rule. Greek stamps with overprint were issued in the occupied zone.

Dates
1940–1941
Currency
100 lepta = 1 drachma
Refer
Greek Occupation Issues

== Albania (Italian Occupation) ==
Albania was occupied by Italian forces in April 1939 as a prelude to the Second World War. Relevant stamps are catalogue nos 337–388 of Albania.

Dates
1939–1943
Currency
100 qintar = 1 franc
Refer
Italian Occupation Issues

== Aldabra ==
A sparsely populated group of coral islands in the Indian Ocean, politically part of the Seychelles. Noted for the Aldabra giant tortoise.

Refer
British Indian Ocean Territory;
Zil Elwannyen Sesel

== Alderney ==
Alderney, one of the Channel Islands, is part of the Bailiwick of Guernsey and its stamps are valid throughout the Bailiwick.

Dates
1983 –
Capital
St Anne
Currency
(British) 100 pence = 1 pound
Main article
Postage stamps and postal history of Alderney, List of postage stamps of Alderney
See also
Guernsey

== Aleutian Islands ==
A chain of islands, sparsely populated, which stretch westward across the North Pacific from Alaska. Politically they are part of Alaska. Have used stamps of the USA only.

Capital
Dutch Harbor
Refer
United States of America

== Alexandretta ==
Now known as Iskenderun, a city and province of Hatay. In 1938, stamps of Syria were issued in Hatay with the overprint SANDJAK D'ALEXANDRETTE (note: "sandjak" is a Turkish word meaning "district").

Refer
Hatay

== Alexandria (French Post Office) ==
A French Post Office was opened at Alexandria in 1830. It issued French stamps without overprint or surcharge 1857–1899. In 1899, it began to issue French stamps with an overprint of ALEXANDRIE. Issues from 1921 were surcharged in Egyptian currency. The office closed in 1931.

Dates
1899–1931
Currency
(1899) 100 centimes = 1 franc
(1921) 1000 milliemes = 1 pound (Egyptian)
Refer
Egypt (French Post Offices)

== Alexandria (Italian Post Office) ==
This office used Italian stamps only (no overprint or surcharge).

Refer
Italian Post Offices Abroad

== Alexandrie ==
Overprint used on French stamps in Alexandria.

Refer
Alexandria (French Post Office)

== Bibliography ==
- Stanley Gibbons Ltd, various catalogues
- Stanley Gibbons Ltd, Europe and Colonies 1970, Stanley Gibbons Ltd, 1969
- Stuart Rossiter & John Flower, The Stamp Atlas, W H Smith, 1989
- XLCR Stamp Finder and Collector's Dictionary, Thomas Cliffe Ltd, c.1960
