= Compendium of postage stamp issuers (Br–Bz) =

Each "article" in this category is in fact a collection of entries about several stamp issuers, presented in alphabetical order. The entries themselves are formulated on the micro model and so provide summary information about all known issuers.

See the Category:Compendium of postage stamp issuers page for details of the project.

== Brunei ==
Dates
1895 –
Capital
Bandar Seri Begawan
Currency
100 cents = 1 dollar

Main Article
Postage stamps and postal history of Brunei

== Brunei (Japanese Occupation) ==
Dates
1942 – 1945
Currency
100 cents = 1 dollar

Refer
Japanese Occupation Issues

== Brunswick ==
Brunswick joined the North German Confederation in 1868.

Dates
1852 – 1868
Capital
Brunswick
Currency
30 silbergroschen = 1 thaler

Refer
German States

== Buenos Aires ==
Dates
1858 – 1862
Currency
8 reales = 1 peso

Refer
Argentine Territories

== Bukovina ==
Refer
West Ukraine

== Bulgaria ==
Dates
1879 –
Capital
Sofia
Currency
(1879) 100 centimes = 1 franc
(1881) 100 stotinki = 1 lev

Main Article
Postage stamps and postal history of Bulgaria

== Bulgarian Occupation Issues ==
Refer
Dobruja (Bulgarian Occupation)

== Bulgarian Territories ==
Main Article Needed

Includes
Dobruja (Bulgarian Occupation);
Eastern Rumelia;
South Bulgaria

== Bundi ==
Indian state which became part of Rajasthan 1948–50.

Dates
1894 – 1948
Currency
12 pies = 1 anna; 16 annas = 1 rupee

Refer
Indian Native States

== Burkina Faso ==
Formerly Upper Volta.

Dates
1984 –
Capital
Ouagadougou
Currency
100 centimes = 1 franc

Main Article
Postage stamps and postal history of Burkina Faso

See also
Upper Volta

== Burma ==
Dates
1937 –
Capital
Rangoon
Currency
(1937) 12 pies = 1 anna; 16 annas = 1 rupee
(1953) 100 pyas = 1 kyat (rupee)

Main Article
Postage stamps and postal history of Burma

Includes
Myanmar

== Burma (Japanese Occupation) ==
Dates
1942 – 1945
Currency
(1942) 12 pies = 1 anna; 16 annas = 1 rupee
(1942) 100 cents = 1 rupee

Refer
Japanese Occupation Issues

== Burundi ==
Dates
1962 –
Capital
Bujumbura
Currency
100 centimes = 1 franc

Main Article
Postage stamps and postal history of Burundi

== Bushire (British Occupation) ==
Bushire (now Bushehr) is an Iranian port on the Persian Gulf. During World War I, it was occupied by British forces who issued separate stamps 15 August to 16 October 1915. There were 30 stamps in three issues. All were Iranian types overprinted BUSHIRE UNDER BRITISH OCCUPATION.

Dates
1915 only
Currency
20 shahis = 1 kran; 10 kran = 1 toman

Refer
British Occupation Issues

== Bussahir ==
Dates
1895 – 1901
Currency
16 annas = 1 rupee

Refer
Indian Native States

== Byelorussia ==
Refer
Belarus

== Bibliography ==
- Stanley Gibbons Ltd, Europe and Colonies 1970, Stanley Gibbons Ltd, 1969
- Stanley Gibbons Ltd, various catalogues
- Stuart Rossiter & John Flower, The Stamp Atlas, W H Smith, 1989
- XLCR Stamp Finder and Collector's Dictionary, Thomas Cliffe Ltd, c.1960
