= Compendium of postage stamp issuers (Ka–Kh) =

Each "article" in this category is a collection of entries about several stamp issuers, presented in alphabetical order. The entries are formulated on the micro model and so provide summary information about all known issuers.

See the Category:Compendium of postage stamp issuers page for details of the project.

== Kalimnos ==
Dates
1912–1932
Capital
Kalimnos
Currency
100 centesimi = 1 lira

Refer
Aegean Islands (Dodecanese)

== Kamerun ==
Dates
1897–1915
Capital
Yaoundé
Currency
100 pfennige = 1 mark

Refer
German Colonies

== Kampuchea ==
Dates
1980–1989
Capital
Phnom Penh
Currency
100 cents = 1 riel

Refer
Cambodia

See also
Khmer Republic

== Kandia ==
Refer
Crete (Foreign Post Offices)

== Karikal ==
Refer
French Indian Settlements

== Karki ==
Refer
Khalki

== Karolinen ==
Refer
Caroline Islands

== Karpathos ==
Dates
1912–1932
Capital
Currency
100 centesimi = 1 lira

Refer
Aegean Islands (Dodecanese)

== Kashmir ==
Refer
Jammu & Kashmir

== Kasos ==
Dates
1912–1932
Capital
Ayia Marina
Currency
100 centesimi = 1 lira

Refer
Aegean Islands (Dodecanese)

== Kastellórizo ==
Refer
Castelrosso (Kastellórizo)

== Katanga ==
Dates
1960–1963
Capital
Elisabethville
Currency
100 centimes = 1 franc

Refer
Zaire

== Kathiri State of Seiyun ==
Dates
1942–1967
Capital
Seiyun
Currency
(1942) 16 annas = 1 rupee
(1951) 100 cents = 1 shilling
(1966) 1000 fils = 1 dinar

Refer
Aden Protectorate States

== Kavalla (French Post Office) ==
Dates
1893–1914
Currency
25 centimes = 1 piastre

Refer
French Post Offices in the Turkish Empire

See also
Kavalla (Greek Occupation)

== Kavalla (Greek Occupation) ==
Dates
1913 only
Currency
100 lepta = 1 drachma

Refer
Greek Occupation Issues

== Kazakhstan ==
Dates
1992 –
Capital
Nur-Sultan
Currency
(1992) 100 kopecks = 1 Russian ruble
(1994) 100 tyin (ty) = 1 tenge (t)

Main article
Postage stamps and postal history of Kazakhstan

See also
Union of Soviet Socialist Republics (USSR)

== Kedah ==
Dates
1912 –
Capital
Alor Setar
Currency
100 cents = 1 dollar

Main Article Needed

See also
Malaysia

== Kefalonia ==
Refer
Cephalonia and Ithaca (Italian Occupation)

== Kelantan ==
Dates
1911 –
Capital
Kota Baharu
Currency
100 cents = 1 dollar

Main Article Needed

See also
Malaysia

== Kelantan (Japanese Occupation) ==
Dates
1942–1945
Currency
100 cents = 1 dollar

Refer
Japanese Occupation Issues

== Kenya ==
Dates
1963 –
Capital
Nairobi
Currency
100 cents = 1 shilling

Main Article Needed
Postage stamps and postal history of Kenya

See also
British East Africa;
Kenya Uganda & Tanzania (Combined Issues)

== Kenya & Uganda ==
Dates
1922–1935
Capital
Nairobi
Currency
100 cents = 1 shilling

Refer
Kenya Uganda & Tanzania (Combined Issues)

== Kenya Uganda & Tanganyika ==
Dates
1935–1963
Capital
Nairobi
Currency
100 cents = 1 shilling

Refer
Kenya Uganda & Tanzania (Combined Issues)

== Kenya Uganda Tanganyika & Zanzibar ==
Dates
1964 only
Capital
Nairobi
Currency
100 cents = 1 shilling

Refer
Kenya Uganda & Tanzania (Combined Issues)

== Kenya Uganda & Tanzania ==
Dates
1965–1975
Capital
Nairobi
Currency
100 cents = 1 shilling

Refer
Kenya Uganda & Tanzania (Combined Issues)

== Kenya Uganda & Tanzania (Combined Issues) ==
Includes
Kenya & Uganda;
Kenya Uganda & Tanganyika;
Kenya Uganda Tanganyika & Zanzibar;
Kenya Uganda & Tanzania

== Kerguelen ==
Refer
French Southern & Antarctic Territories

== Kerrasunde (Russian Post Office) ==
Dates
1909–1910
Currency
40 paras = 1 piastre

Refer
Russian Post Offices in the Turkish Empire

== Khalki ==
Dates
1912–1932
Capital
Currency
100 centesimi = 1 lira

Refer
Aegean Islands (Dodecanese)

== Khania (Italian Post Office) ==
Dates
1900–1912
Currency
(1900) 40 paras = 1 piastre
(1906) 100 centesimi = 1 lira

Refer
Italian Post Offices Abroad

See also
Crete (Foreign Post Offices)

== Khios ==
Dates
1913 only
Capital
Khios
Currency
100 lepta = 1 drachma (Greek)

Refer
Greek Occupation Issues

== Khmer Republic ==
Dates
1971–1975
Capital
Phnom Penh
Currency
100 cents = 1 riel

Refer
Cambodia

See also
Kampuchea

== Khor Fakkan ==
Refer
Sharjah

== Bibliography ==
- Stanley Gibbons Ltd, Europe and Colonies 1970, Stanley Gibbons Ltd, 1969
- Stanley Gibbons Ltd, various catalogues
- Stuart Rossiter & John Flower, The Stamp Atlas, W H Smith, 1989
- XLCR Stamp Finder and Collector's Dictionary, Thomas Cliffe Ltd, c.1960
