= Compendium of postage stamp issuers (Brit–British) =

Each "article" in this category is a collection of entries about several stamp issuers, presented in alphabetical order. The entries are formulated on the micro model and so provide summary information about all known issuers.

See the Category:Compendium of postage stamp issuers page for details of the project.

== Britain ==
Refer
Great Britain

== British Administration Issues ==
Refer
Eritrea (British Administration);
Somalia (British Administration);
Tripolitania (British Military Administration)

== British Antarctic Territory ==
Dates
1963 –
Currency
(1963) 12 pence = 1 shilling, 20 shillings = 1 pound
(1971) 100 pence = 1 pound

See also
Falkland Islands Dependencies;
South Georgia & South Sandwich Islands

== British Bechuanaland ==
Territory in southern Africa which was separated from Bechuanaland Protectorate (now Botswana) by the Molopo river. British Bechuanaland became a British colony on 30 September 1885 but was added to Cape Colony on 16 November 1895. It is now the northern part of Cape Province in South Africa.

The first stamps issued were Cape of Good Hope types with an overprint. Specific types were issued in 1887 but subsequently there were further British and Cape types with overprints. Cape of Good Hope stamps were introduced to British Bechuanaland in 1895 but, conversely, British Bechuanaland types were retained for use in the neighbouring Bechuanaland Protectorate from 1890 to 1897.

Dates
1885 – 1897
Capital
Mafeking
Currency
12 pence = 1 shilling, 20 shillings = 1 pound

Refer
Cape of Good Hope

See also
Bechuanaland Protectorate

== British Central Africa ==
Dates
1891 – 1908
Capital
Zomba
Currency
12 pence = 1 shilling; 20 shillings = 1 pound

Main article
Postage stamps and postal history of British Central Africa

See also
Malawi;
Nyasaland Protectorate

== British Columbia ==
Dates
1865 – 1868
Capital
Vancouver
Currency
(1865) 12 pence = 1 shilling; 20 shillings = 1 pound
(1868) 100 cents = 1 dollar
Main Article
Postage stamps and postal history of British Columbia
Includes
British Columbia and Vancouver Island
Vancouver Island
See also
Canadian Provinces

== British Columbia & Vancouver Island ==
Dates
1860 only
Capital
Vancouver
Currency
12 pence = 1 shilling; 20 shillings = 1 pound
Refer
British Columbia

== British Commonwealth Occupation of Japan ==
Refer
Japan (British Commonwealth Occupation)

== British Consular Mail ==
Refer
Madagascar (British Consular Mail)

== British East Africa ==
Dates
1895 – 1903
Capital
Nairobi
Currency
16 annas = 1 rupee

Includes
British East Africa Company;
East Africa & Uganda Protectorates;
Uganda Protectorate

See also
Kenya Uganda & Tanzania (Combined Issues)

== British East Africa Company ==
Dates
1890 – 1895
Currency
16 annas = 1 rupee

Refer
British East Africa

== British Field Office in Salonika ==
Refer
Salonika (British Field Office)

== British Forces in Egypt ==
Refer
Egypt (British Forces)

== British Guiana ==
Dates
1850 – 1966
Capital
Georgetown
Currency
100 cents = 1 dollar

See also
Guyana

== British Honduras ==
Dates
1866 – 1973
Capital
Belize
Currency
(1866) 12 pence = 1 shilling; 20 shillings = 1 pound
(1888) 100 cents = 1 dollar

Main Article Needed

See also
Belize

== British Indian Ocean Territory ==
Dates
1868 – 1976
Capital
Victoria (on Mahe, Seychelles)
Currency
100 cents = 1 rupee

Main Article Postage stamps and postal history of British Indian Ocean Territory

See also
Seychelles;
Zil Elwannyen Sesel

== British Levant ==
Refer
British Post Offices in the Turkish Empire

== British Middle East Forces ==
Refer
Middle East Forces

== British Military Administration Issues (BMA) ==
Refer
Eritrea (British Military Administration);
Malaya (British Military Administration);
North Borneo (British Military Administration);
Sarawak (British Military Administration);
Somalia (British Military Administration);
Tripolitania (British Military Administration)

== British New Guinea ==
Dates
1901 – 1906
Capital
Port Moresby
Currency
12 pence = 1 shilling; 20 shillings = 1 pound

Refer
Papua New Guinea

== British Occupation Issues ==
Main Article Needed

Includes
Baghdad (British Occupation);
Batum (British Occupation);
Bushire (British Occupation);
Cameroons (British Occupation);
East Africa Forces;
German East Africa (British Occupation);
Iraq (British Occupation);
Japan (British Commonwealth Occupation);
Long Island (British Occupation);
Mafia Island (British Occupation)

See also
BA/BMA Issues;
Egypt (British Forces);
Germany (Allied Occupation);
Middle East Forces;
Togo (Anglo–French Occupation)

== British Occupation of Italian Colonies ==
Refer
BA/BMA Issues;
East Africa Forces;
Middle East Forces

== British Postal Agencies in Eastern Arabia ==
British stamps overprinted with Indian currency; used in Abu Dhabi, Bahrain, Dubai, Kuwait, Muscat and Qatar.

Muscat and Dubai relied on Indian postal administration until 1 April 1948 when the British agencies were established. Two agencies were opened in Qatar: at Doha (August 1950) and Umm Said (February 1956). In Abu Dhabi, an agency was opened on Das Island in December 1960 and in Abu Dhabi City on 30 March 1963. The agencies also supplied stamps to Bahrain until 1960; and to Kuwait during shortages in 1951–1953.

The agency in Dubai issued the Trucial States stamps on 7 January 1961.

As each state took over its own postal administration, the offices closed. Closure dates were: Qatar on 31 March 1957; Dubai on 14 June 1963; Abu Dhabi on 29 March 1964; finally Muscat on 29 April 1966.

Dates
1948 – 1966
Currency
(1948) 12 pies = 1 anna; 16 annas = 1 rupee
(1957) 100 naye paise = 1 rupee

Main Article Needed

See also
Abu Dhabi;
Bahrain;
Dubai;
Kuwait;
Muscat;
Qatar;
Trucial States

== British Post Offices Abroad ==
Main Article Needed

Includes
Bangkok (British Post Office);
China (British Post Offices);
China (British Railway Administration);
Crete (British Post Offices);
Japan (British Post Offices);
Madagascar (British Consular Mail)

See also
British Post Offices in the Turkish Empire;
Morocco Agencies;
Tangier

== British Post Offices in the Turkish Empire ==
Dates
1885 – 1923
Currency
40 paras = 1 piastre

Main Article Needed

Includes
Beirut (British Post Office);
Salonika (British Field Office)

== British Regional Issues ==
Refer
Great Britain (Regional Issues)

== British Solomon Islands ==
Dates
1907 – 1975
Capital
Honiara
Currency
12 pence = 1 shilling; 20 shillings = 1 pound

Refer
Solomon Islands

== British Somaliland ==
Dates
1903 only
Capital
Berbera
Currency
16 annas = 1 rupee

Refer
Somaliland Protectorate

== British South Africa Company ==
In 1924, the territory was divided into Northern and Southern Rhodesia.

Dates
1890 – 1924
Currency
12 pence = 1 shilling; 20 shillings = 1 pound

Main Article Needed

See also
Rhodesia

== British Virgin Islands ==
Dates
1968 –
Capital
Road Town
Currency
100 cents = 1 dollar

Main Article
Postage stamps and postal history of the British Virgin Islands

Includes
Virgin Islands

See also
Leeward Islands

== British Zone ==
No separate issues. From 1945 to 1949, always used the same stamps as the American Zone.

Refer
American, British & Russian Zones (General Issues);
Anglo–American Zones (Civil Government);
Anglo–American Zones (Military Government)

== Bibliography ==
- Stanley Gibbons Ltd, Europe and Colonies 1970, Stanley Gibbons Ltd, 1969
- Stanley Gibbons Ltd, various catalogues
- Stuart Rossiter & John Flower, The Stamp Atlas, W H Smith, 1989
- XLCR Stamp Finder and Collector's Dictionary, Thomas Cliffe Ltd, c.1960
