= Jordan Post Company =

Hashemite Kingdom of Jordan Jordan Post Company
- البريد الأردني
- Coat of arms of Jordan

Agency overview
- Headquarters: Amman (Jordan)
- Agency executive: Ahmad Obaidat, Director General
- Parent agency: Ministry of Communications and Information Technology
- Website: http://www.jordanpost.com.jo

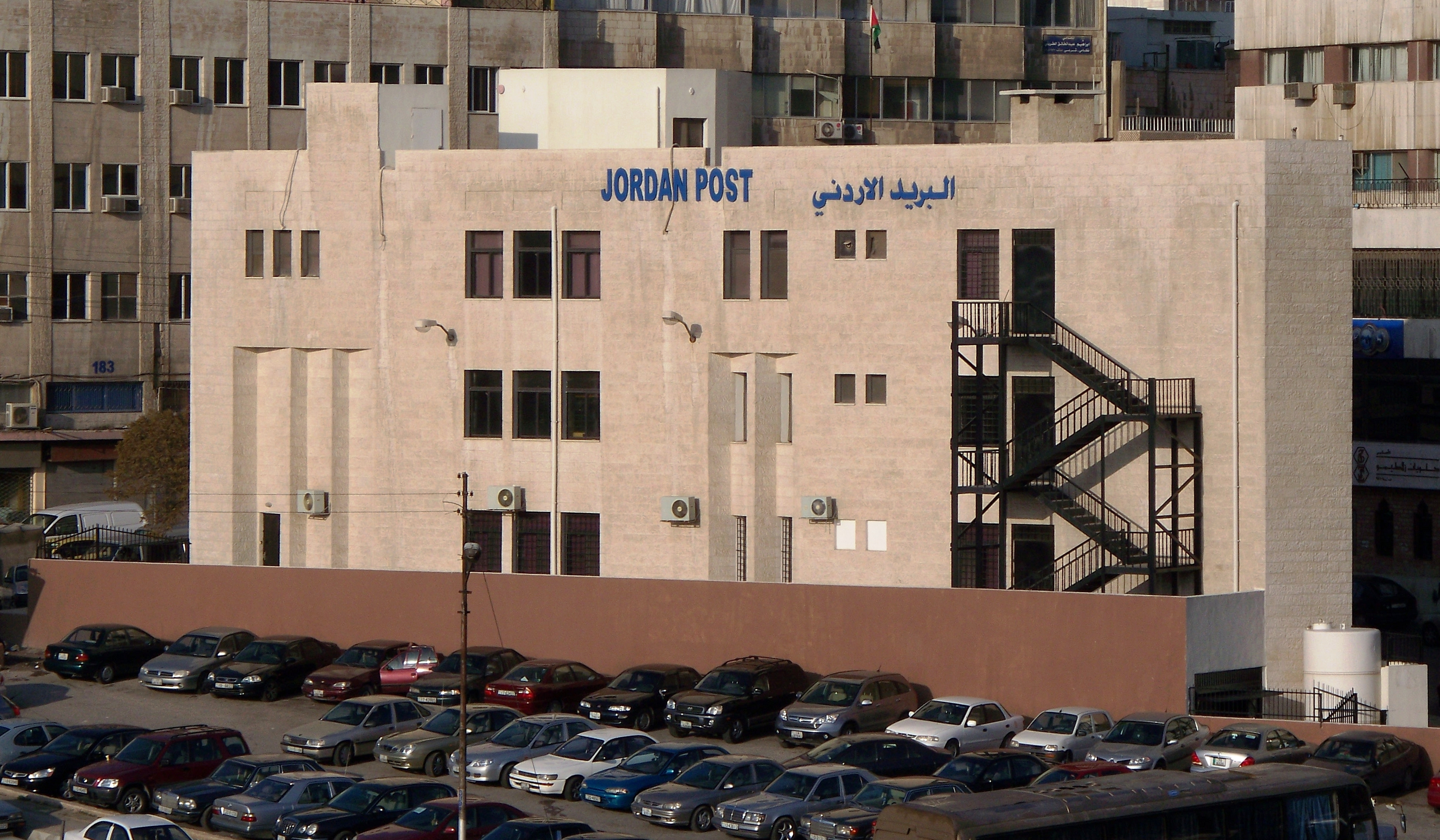
A Jordan Post building in Amman

Jordan Post Company is owned by the government of Jordan, and runs the postal services in the kingdom. The company is responsible to the Ministry of Communications and Information Technology.

== History ==
The first government-run postal service was established in 1921, immediately after the establishment of the Emirate of Transjordan, It was named the Postal Department and started by taking over the postal service that was run by the Ottoman Empire. The postal department started with eight post offices in 1921.

== Services ==
- Financial Services: includes the Postal Saving Bank, money transfer services and bill payment services for some companies
- Postal services: from regular to expedited postal services and postal box service.
- SMS notification services: Postal arrival and delivery confirmation services through sms
- Other services: such as collecting court-ordered payments from one party to another.

== See also ==
- Postage stamps and postal history of Jordan
