= Kyrgyz Express Post =

Postal company in Kyrgyzstan

"Kyrgyz Express Post" LLC
- Company type: Limited liability company
- Industry: Postal services, courier
- Founded: 2012
- Headquarters: 26, Usenbaev Street, Bishkek, 729001, Bishkek, Kyrgyzstan
- Area served: Worldwide
- Key people: Zhanybek ESENBAEV, Chief Executive
- Services: Letter post, parcel service
- Website: www.kep.kg

Kyrgyz Express Post is the postal operator of Kyrgyzstan that was granted the status of the second designated postal operator of Kyrgyzstan. The company was founded on March 16, 2012.

== General information ==
Kyrgyz Express Post (KEP) has been operating as the postal operator of Kyrgyzstan since March 16, 2012. On December 7, 2012, KEP was granted the status of the second designated postal operator of Kyrgyzstan. This status is officially confirmed by the Universal Postal Union International Bureau circular 83 of 21 May 2013, the respective information can be found on the official page of the UPU.

The status of the second designated postal operator allows KEP to issue postage stamps and use them as real payment instrument for all kinds of postal services, as well as satisfy the needs of philatelists.

== Philately ==
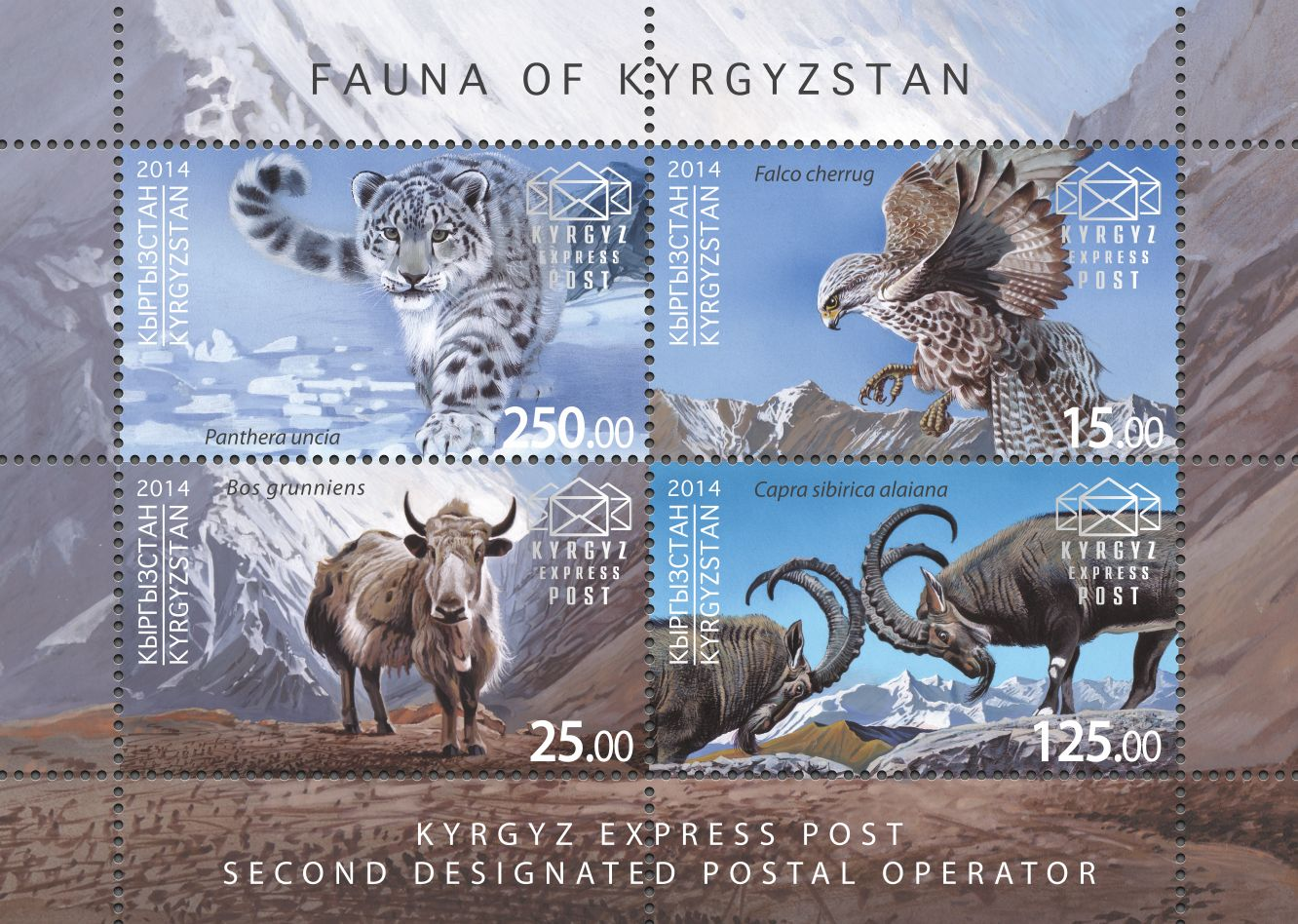
"Fauna of Kyrgyzstan" Minisheet, collective

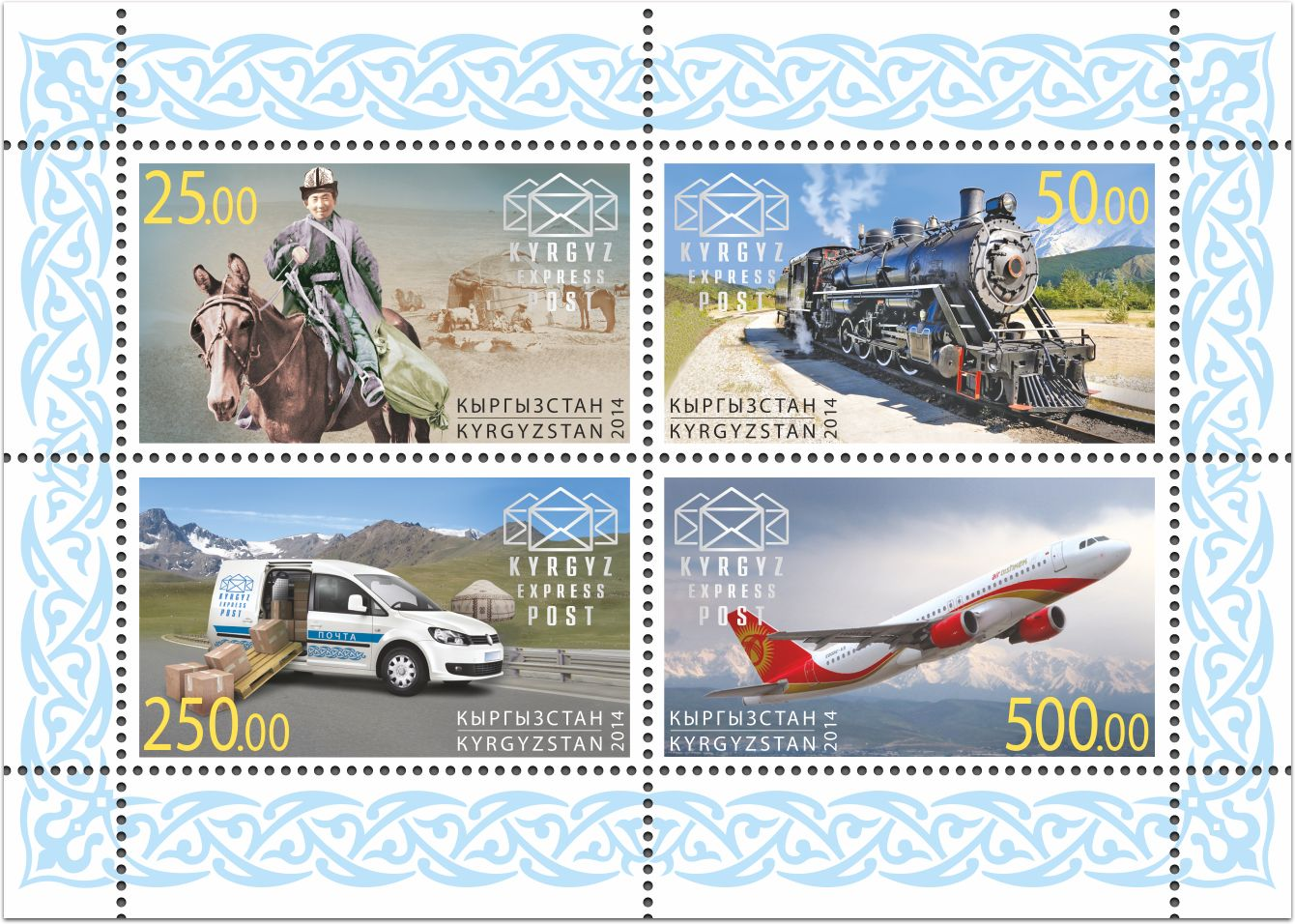
"Postal transportation of Kyrgyzstan" Minisheet, collective

On November 18, 2014, Kyrgyz Express Post issued its first postage stamps and souvenir sheet. The issue was dedicated to the 140th anniversary of the UPU. Stamps depict the history of the Kyrgyz postal service, namely the means of postal transportation.

On November 19, 2014, KEP issued the second series of stamps, dedicated to the Fauna of Kyrgyzstan. These stamps depict typical representatives of the Kyrgyz animal world: Saker Falcon, Yak, Central Asian Ibex and Snow Leopard.

The KEP stamps can be purchased at the main office of the postal operator in Bishkek, as well as online on the KEP website.

== See also ==
- Postage stamps and postal history of Kyrgyzstan
