= Tom of Finland stamps =

Finnish postal stamps

The stamp sheet

The Tom of Finland stamps are a 2014 issue of three Finnish first-class stamps drawn by and celebrating the work of Finnish artist Tom of Finland (born Touko Laaksonen).

== Release ==
The stamps were announced by the Finnish postal service Itella Posti Oy in April 2014 and were released on September 8. They are considered to be the world's first stamp depicting homoerotic art.

According to the Tom of Finland Foundation (TFF), selection of the images for the stamps was coordinated by Solja Järvenpää of Arts Promotion Centre Finland, Susanna Luoto and Durk Dehner of TFF, and Timo Berry of the Finnish design agency BOTH, who designed them.

Itella Posti Oy praised the artist's works as having attained iconic status in their genre and had an influence on, for instance, pop culture and fashion. The new Finnish Postal Museum in Tampere opened with an exhibit of the artist's work and letter exchanges to coincide with the stamps' release.

Art critic Estelle Lovatt said the stamps were a "great statement"; she and others including Mark Joseph Stern, writer of an LGBTQ blog at Slate, noted that Finland then had not yet legalized same-sex marriage. In Finland, an online petition called for cancellation of the issue as "[neither] aesthetically beautiful [nor] culturally valuable", and the Christian-owned department store chain Halpa-Halli refused to stock them. The issue of the stamps ran parallel to public debate on legalisation of gay marriage in the same year; a bill for legalisation was approved by the Parliament on 12 December 2014.

== Design ==
The postage stamps are the work of Finnish designer Timo Berry and are based on drawings by Touko Laaksonen. As Berry and others pointed out, Tom of Finland's greatest significance is his penchant for strong gay masculinity. Previously homosexuals had been portrayed as foppish, weak or girlish. Laaksonen developed first elements of his style, including a hang for uniforms, during Finland's Continuation War (1941–1944) when German troops were stationed in Helsinki. The issue is a miniature sheet consisting of three first-class self-adhesive stamps: two depict sections of a drawing of a nude man sitting between the legs of another man dressed as a police officer and with a cigarette in his mouth; the other depicts a nude backside with a man's face peering between the two legs.

== International reception ==
The Finnish postal service reported a record amount of interest in the stamp issue, including pre-orders from 178 countries. Itella planned to produce 200,000 sheets and allows for online orders by overseas buyers. The German Tagesspiegel called the series a Kassenschlager, a world-wide box office success. Most orders came from Sweden, the United Kingdom, the United States, and France. Seth Millstein wrote in Bustle: "The designs aren't quite explicit, but they're worlds more graphic than anything that's ever appeared on a U.S. postage stamp." A writer in the Washington Post called them "pretty risque". A first-day set of the stamps was acquired by the Victoria and Albert Museum in London as a "significant addition to objects of LGBTQ culture in the collection".

Vitaly Milonov, an anti-gay Russian politician then on the Saint Petersburg council, called for the stamps to be banned in Russia and for Finns to voluntarily refrain from using them on post to Russia.

== Status as first erotic stamps ==
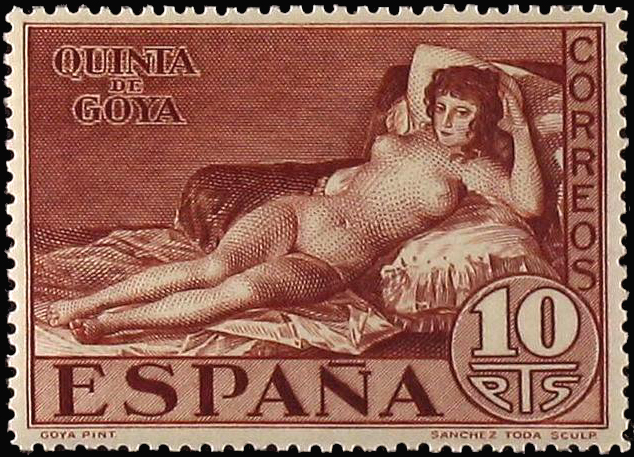
Naked Maja on a 1930 Spanish stamp

According to Dean Shepherd, editor of Gibbons Stamp Monthly, they are probably the first stamps with erotic art of any kind. However, according to Markku Penttinen, development manager with Finland's postal services, as early as the 1950s Finnish stamps showed naked women in the sauna. Both male and female nudity appeared on stamps already in the 19th century. The 1930 Spanish stamps depicting Goya's Naked Maja constituted the first open image of the body of a human woman (as opposed to a Greek goddess) with pubic hair on a stamp and led to scandal then.

== See also ==
- Postage stamps and postal history of Finland
