= Postage stamps and postal history of Finland =

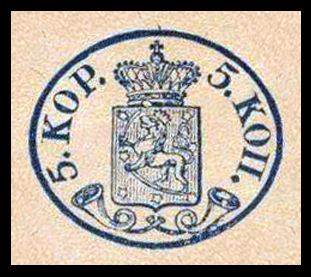
The first Finnish stamp, issued under Russian rule in 1856

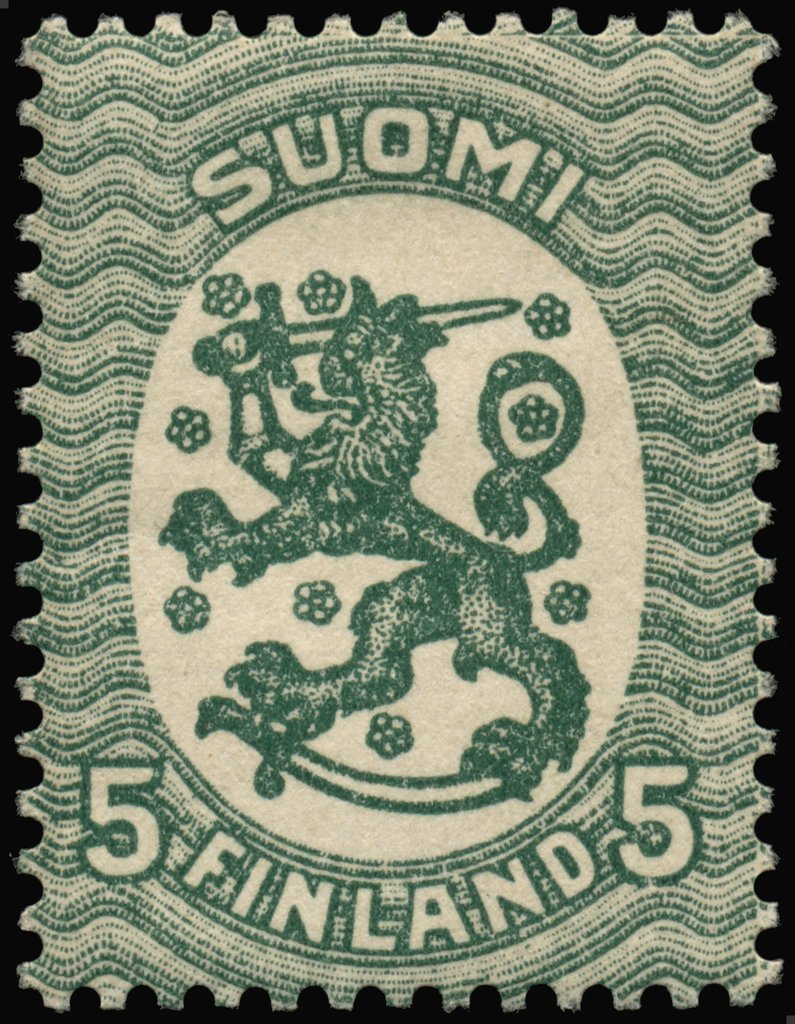
5 markka stamp of the first series issued by independent Finland, 1917

Finland has produced postage stamps for use since 1856.

== Early history: background ==
In the war of 1808–1809, Russian troops conquered Finland. Finland had been a part of Sweden and was annexed to the Russian empire at the Peace Treaty of Hamina on 17 September 1809. Finland became an autonomous Grand Duchy of the Russian Empire. The Russian Tsar Alexander I (1801–1825) promised that Finland could uphold the existing religion, the basic laws and privileges of the social order.

Finland was allowed to manage its affairs and employment of its own civil servants. The first Finnish stamps, the simple unperforated soikiomerkit (lit. 'oval stamps') in denominations of 5 and 10 kopecks, were issued in 1856. A parliament began to assemble from the year 1863—the same year where Finnish language got official status and became equal with the Swedish language. In 1865, Finland got its own currency—penni and markka—which quickly turned out to be stronger than the Russian Rouble. From the 1860s, trading—import and export—grow rapidly. Population grew from 1 million in 1809 to over 3 million by the end of World War I.

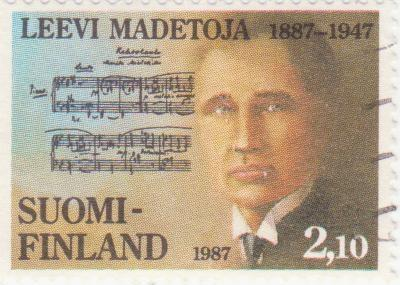
Commemorative honoring Leevi Madetoja, 1987

When Alexander III ascended the throne in 1881, a process of making Finland a more integrated part of the empire started—many attacks were made in the Russian public on the special rights of the Finnish people and efforts were undertaken to abolish these special rights granted to them, and by many small steps this led to the Russification of the Finnish Post.

Finland issued its first own stamps on October 1, 1917, two months before declaring independence.

== Personalised stamps ==
The Finnish Post Office now offers a service by which the purchaser of postage stamps can have their own chosen image personalized onto the face of a postage stamp. The user uploads the image to the post office web site and pays a fee over and above the price of a normal postage stamp.

== See also ==
- Postage stamps and postal history of the Åland Islands
- Postage stamps and postal history of Karelia
- Tom of Finland stamps
