= Postage stamps and postal history of Aden =

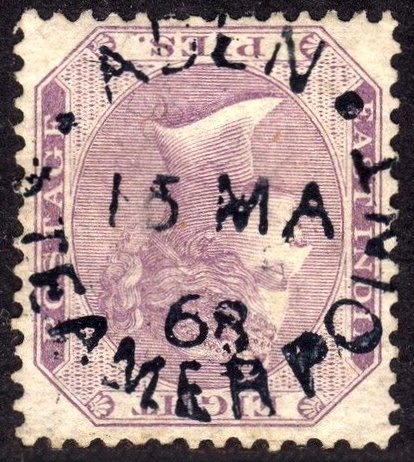
An Aden Steamer Point postmark of 1868 on a stamp of British East India. (Image inverted to allow the postmark to be read)

Aden is a city in southern Yemen. Aden's location made it a popular exchange port for mail passing between places around the Indian Ocean and Europe. When Captain S. B. Haines of the Indian Marine, the East India Company's navy, occupied Aden on 19 January 1839, mail services were immediately established in the settlement with a complement of two postal clerks and four letter carriers. An interim postmaster was appointed as early as June 1839. Mail is known to exist from 15 June 1839, although a regular postmaster was not appointed until 1857; one of the officials of the Political Agent or the civil surgeon performed the duties of postmaster for a small salary.

== Stamps of British India ==
By the Indian Post Office Act of 1837 (Section XX) all private vessels were required to carry letters at prescribed rates for postage. A handstamp was applied to preadhesive ship letters in Aden; although these handstamps were used until 1867, examples are rarely seen.

The Aden Settlement used adhesive postage stamps of British India from 1 October 1854 until Aden became a crown colony on 1 April 1937. As an outpost of the British East Indian empire, Aden was supplied with India's first lithographed adhesives, which became available in Aden just as they were issued on the Indian mainland. Until 1857, the only Aden post office was in the Crater, later known as Aden Cantonment or Aden Camp. Mails were carried by camel to and from Steamer Point. In 1857 a Postmaster was appointed and the main post office was moved to new quarters at Steamer Point. Covers from Aden with the Indian lithographed stamps are rare.

Although these stamps did not have an Aden overprint, many of them may be recognised (even off cover) from the frequent use of the number 124 in postmarks, a number assigned to Aden as part of the Indian post office identification system. However, other numbers and letters also were used to identify the offices in Aden: these include 132, 125, A/125, B and B-22.

== First stamps ==
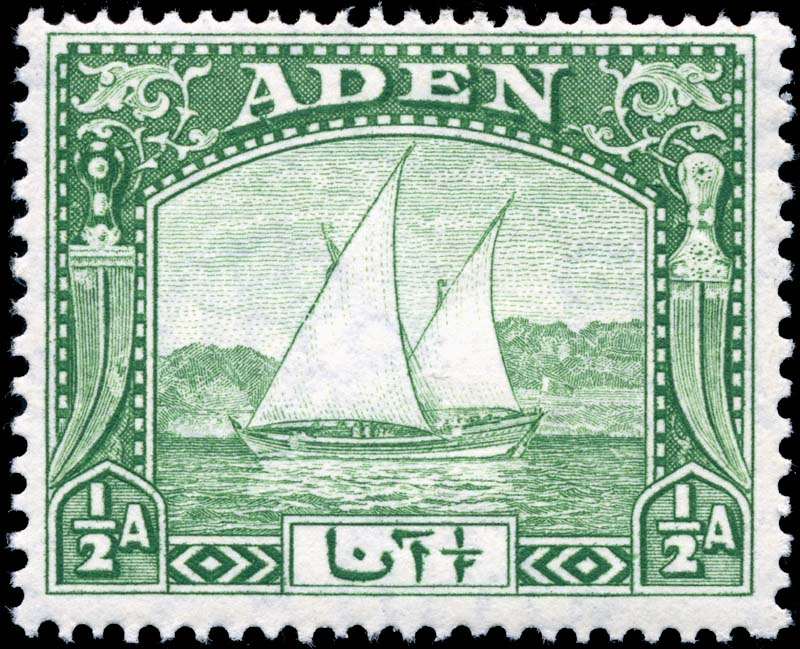
Stamp of the definitive issue of 1937

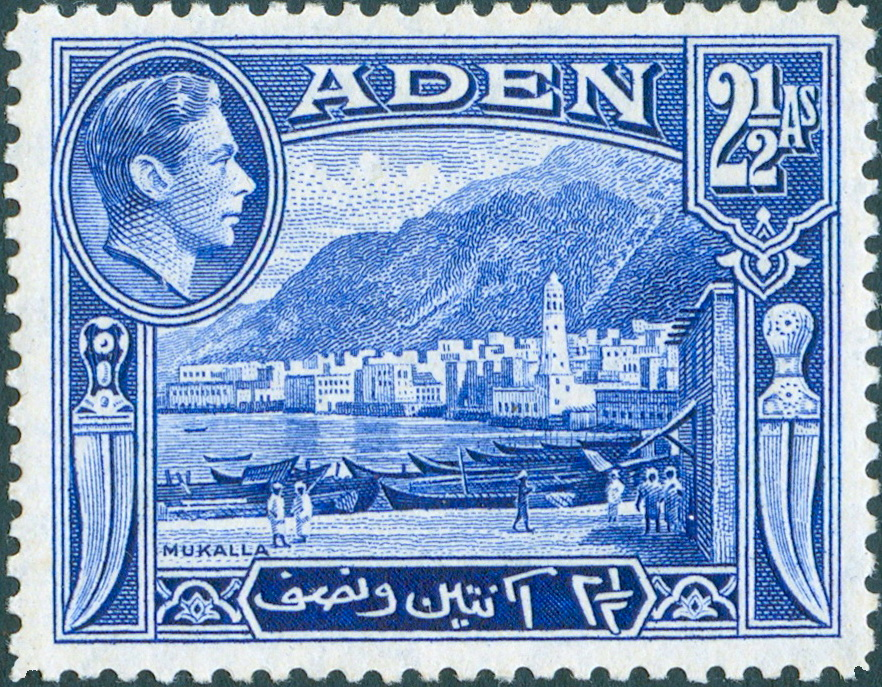
Stamp of the George VI issue of 1939

== Dhow Issue ==
In 1937, the Settlement was detached from India and became the Colony of Aden, a British Crown colony. The new colony received a series of twelve definitive stamps depicting a dhow, produced by De La Rue & Co.

== George VI ==
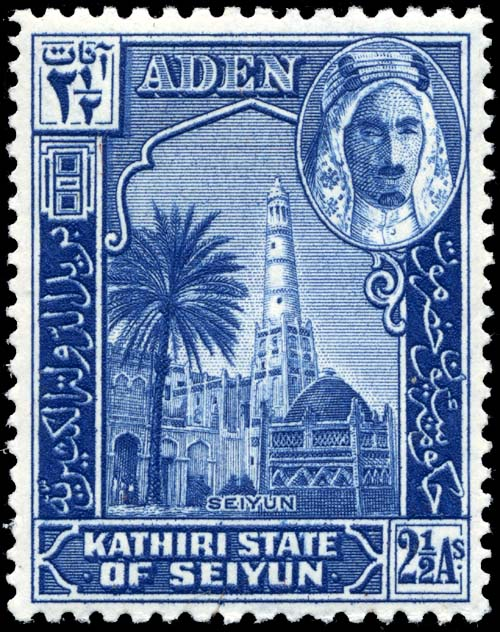
Stamp of the Kathiri State issue of 1942

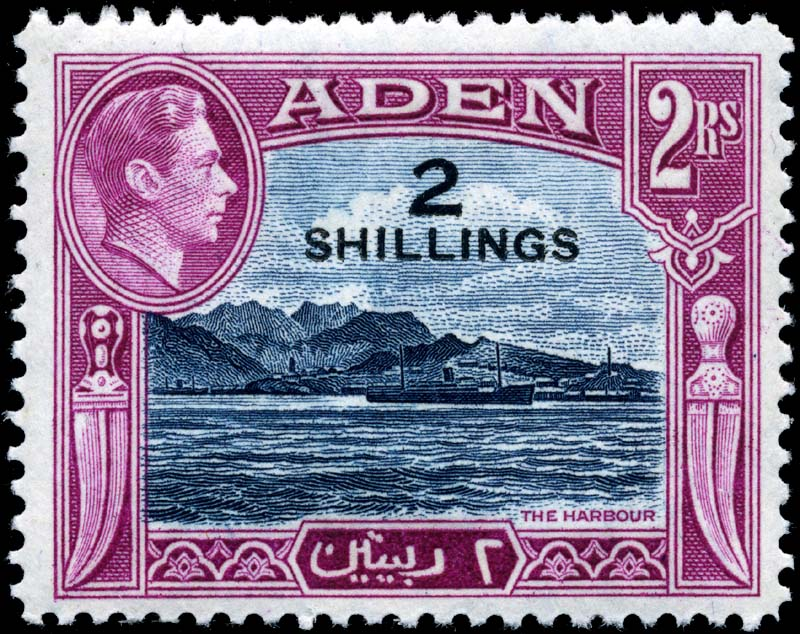
1951 shilling overprint on definitive issue of 1939

In 1939, a new definitive issue with the effigy of King George VI was issued. The sultans of the two major states in the Hadhramaut (part of the Aden Protectorate) objected to this since they were sovereigns in their own right and were not subjects of the King of the United Kingdom. Therefore the British government issued separate stamps in 1942, with the additional inscriptions Kathiri State of Seiyun and Qu'aiti State of Shihr and Mukalla (later Qu'aiti State in Hadhramaut), with portraits of the respective sultans replacing the effigy of George VI. All of these types were valid in Aden and in the Aden Protectorate.

In 1951, the definitive issue of 1939 was overprinted with shilling denominations when the British East African shilling replaced the Indian rupee as the legal currency of Aden.

Stamps inscribed Aden were used until 31 March 1965 when all were withdrawn.

Stamps of the Federation of South Arabia, formed from Aden Colony and Aden Protectorate, were issued from 1963 to 1966.

== See also ==
- Federation of South Arabia
- Postage stamps and postal history of Yemen
- Revenue stamps of Aden

== References and sources ==
Sources

- Stanley Gibbons Ltd: various catalogues
- Encyclopaedia of Postal History
- Rossiter, Stuart & John Flower. The Stamp Atlas. London: Macdonald, 1986. ISBN 0-356-10862-7
