= Postage stamps and postal history of Kyrgyzstan =

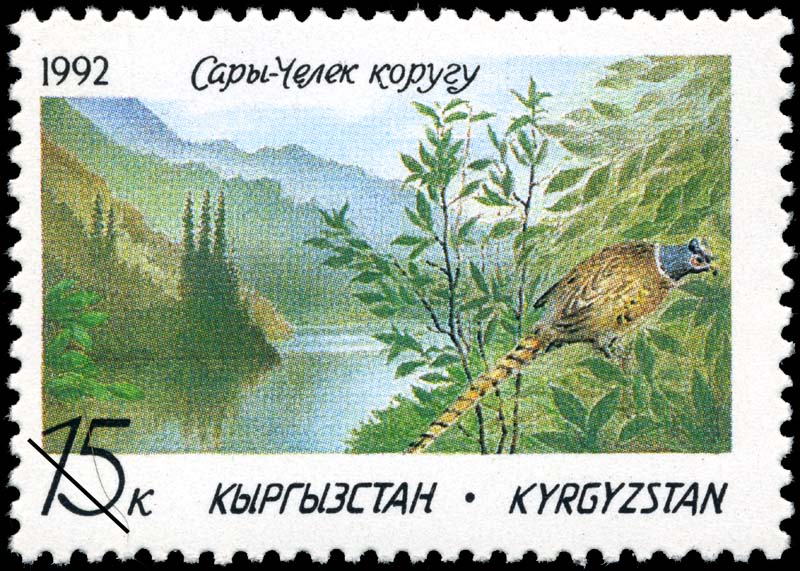
First stamp, 1992

The postal history of Kyrgyzstan began when the nation declared independence in August 1991. Under the Soviet Union, the Kyrgyz SSR postal service was an integral part of the Soviet system. The republic was periodically recognized in sets of stamps honoring the different parts of the USSR. Kyrgyzstan is a member state of the Universal Postal Union since 1993 with its two designated postal operators - "Kyrgyz Pochtasy" SE and "Kyrgyz Express Post" LLC.

== First stamps ==
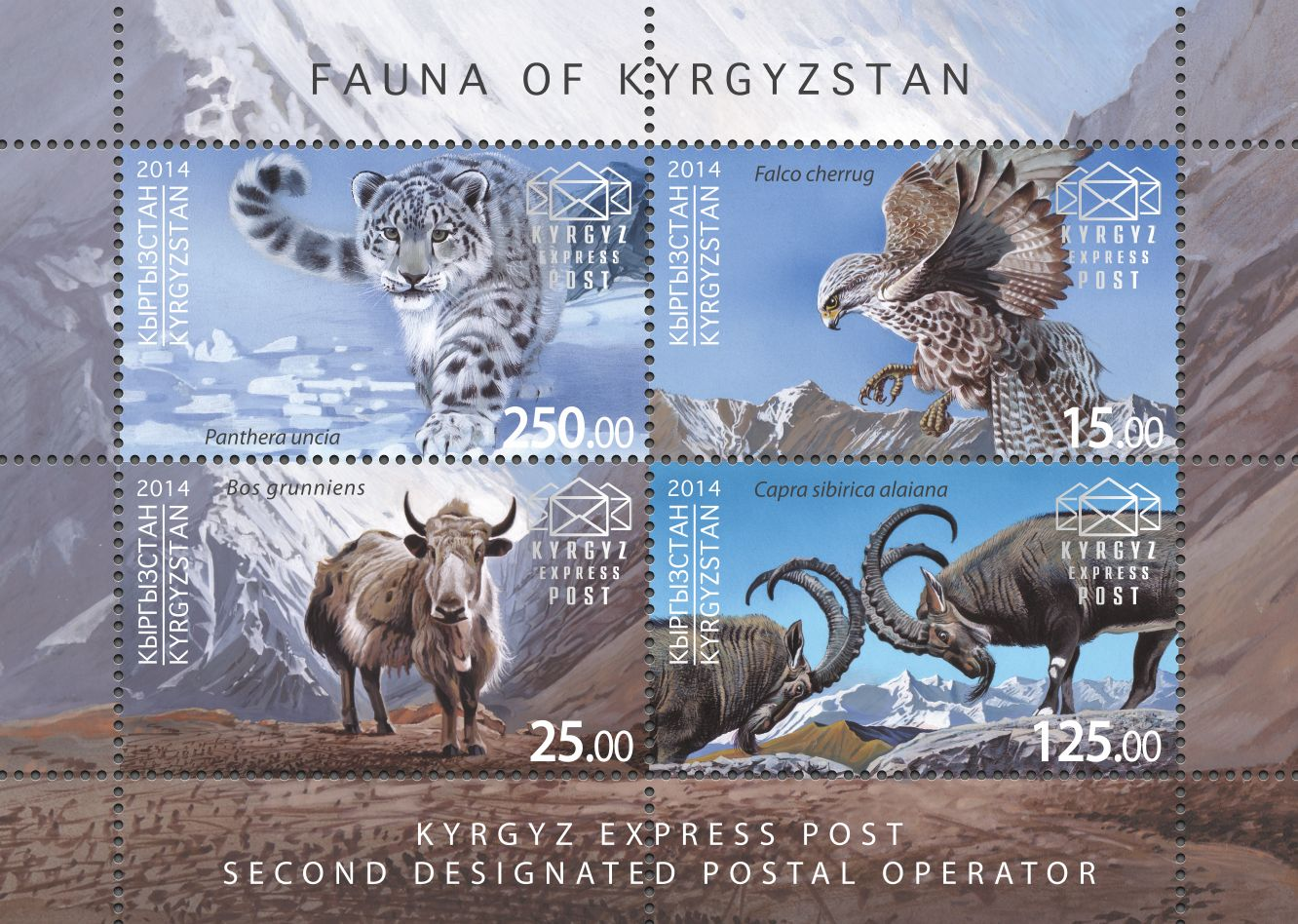
"Fauna of Kyrgyzstan" Minisheet, collective. Kyrgyz Express Post

Kyrgyzstan issued its first postage stamp on 4 February 1992, a single design depicting the Sary-Chelek Nature Preserve in Jalal-Abad Province. The country's name was given in both Cyrillic and Latin letters; many Kyrgyz stamps have since done likewise, although the practice is not consistent, with some stamps only inscribed in Cyrillic and others only in Latin.

In April and June 1993, several types of Russian stamps were surcharged in ruble values, followed in August by the first stamps denominated in tyiyn.

In 2014 the second designated postal operator of Kyrgyzstan, Kyrgyz Express Post (KEP), decided to issue its stamps by the consent of the Ministry of Transport and Communications of the Republic of Kyrgyzstan. During that year, KEP has presented two issues of stamps. The first one, issued on November 18, was dedicated to the 140th anniversary of the Universal Postal Union and Postal transportation of Kyrgyzstan. The second one, issued on November 19, was dedicated to Fauna of Kyrgyzstan.

== Sources ==
- Stanley Gibbons Ltd: various catalogues
- Encyclopaedia of Postal Authorities
- Rossiter, Stuart & John Flower. The Stamp Atlas. London: Macdonald, 1986. ISBN 0-356-10862-7
- Scott catalog
