= Compendium of postage stamp issuers (Z) =

Each "article" in this category is a collection of entries about several stamp issuers, presented alphabetically. The entries are formulated on the micro model, providing summary information about all known issuers.

See the Category:Compendium of postage stamp issuers page for details of the project.

== Zadar ==
Refer
Dalmatia (German Occupation)

== Z. Afr. Republiek ==
Refer
South African Republic

== Zaire ==
Dates
1971 –
Capital
Kinshasa
Currency
100 sengi = 1 makuta; 100 makuta = 1 zaire

Main Article Needed

Includes
Congo Republic (Zaire);
Katanga;
South Kasai

== Zákinthos ==
Refer
Zante (German Occupation)

== Zambezia ==
Dates
1894 – 1917
Capital
Quelimane
Currency
1000 réis = 1 mil réis

Refer
Mozambique Territories

== Zambia ==
Dates
1964 –
Capital
Lusaka
Currency
(1964) 12 pence = 1 shilling; 20 shillings = 1 pound
(1968) 100 ngwee = 1 kwacha

Main Article Postage stamps and postal history of Zambia

See also
Northern Rhodesia

== Zante (German Occupation) ==
Dates
1943 – 1945
Capital
Zákinthos
Currency
100 centesimi = 1 lira

Refer
German Occupation Issues (WW2)

See also
Ionian Islands (Italian Occupation)

== Zanzibar ==
Dates
1895 – 1967
Capital
Zanzibar
Currency
(1895) 16 annas = 1 rupee
(1908) 100 cents = 1 rupee
(1936) 100 cents = 1 shilling

Main Article Postage stamps and postal history of Zanzibar

See also
Kenya Uganda & Tanzania (Combined Issues);
Tanzania

== Zanzibar (French Post Office) ==
Dates
January 16, 1889 – July 31, 1904
Currency
16 annas = 1 rupee

Refer
French Post Offices Abroad

== Zanzibar (German Postal Agency) ==
Dates
1890 – 1891
Currency
100 pfennige = 1 mark

Refer
German Post Offices Abroad

== Zar ==
Refer
South African Republic

== Zil Eloigne Sesel ==
Refer
Zil Elwannyen Sesel

== Zil Elwagne Sesel ==
Refer
Zil Elwannyen Sesel

== Zil Elwannyen Sesel ==
Dates
1980 –
Capital
Currency
100 cents = 1 rupee

Main Article Needed

See also
British Indian Ocean Territory;
Seychelles

== Zimbabwe ==
Dates
1980 –
Capital
Harare (Salisbury)
Currency
100 cents = 1 dollar

Main Article Postage stamps and postal history of Zimbabwe

See also
Rhodesia

== Zuid Afrikaansche Republiek ==
Refer
ZAR

== Zuidwest Afrika ==
Refer
South West Africa

== Zululand ==
Dates
1888 – 1897
Capital
Eshowe
Currency
12 pence = 1 shilling; 20 shillings = 1 pound

Main Article Needed

See also
Natal

== Zurich ==
Dates
1843 – 1850
Currency
100 rappen = 1 franken

Refer
Swiss Cantonal Issues

== Bibliography ==
- Stanley Gibbons Ltd, Europe and Colonies 1970, Stanley Gibbons Ltd, 1969
- Stanley Gibbons Ltd, various catalogues
- Stuart Rossiter & John Flower, The Stamp Atlas, W H Smith, 1989
- XLCR Stamp Finder and Collector's Dictionary, Thomas Cliffe Ltd, c.1960
