= Yemeni buqsha =

Former monetary unit

A buqsha or bogache (Arabic: بقشة buqša) is a former monetary unit of the Mutawakkilite Kingdom of Yemen and the Yemen Arab Republic. 40 buqshas make up one North Yemeni rial.

The buqsha coin itself is bronze and approximately 27 mm (1 inch) across. Modern Yemeni currency also includes silver coins worth 5, 10 and 20 buqshas, and bronze half-buqsha coins. These were introduced after Yemeni independence from the Ottoman Empire.

The buqsha was originally used as one fortieth of the Imadi riyal and later the Ahmadi riyal. When the Yemeni rial was introduced, it was decided that 40 buqshas should represent one Yemeni rial, so as to ease the transition.

At first, many buqshas were produced by the Sanaa local mint, and at one stage in the aftermath of the Yemeni revolution it was claimed that the fuselages of crashed aircraft were being used to mint the coins.

Value	Obverse	Reverse
1 buqsha		
2 buqsha		
