= Postage stamps and postal history of Åland =

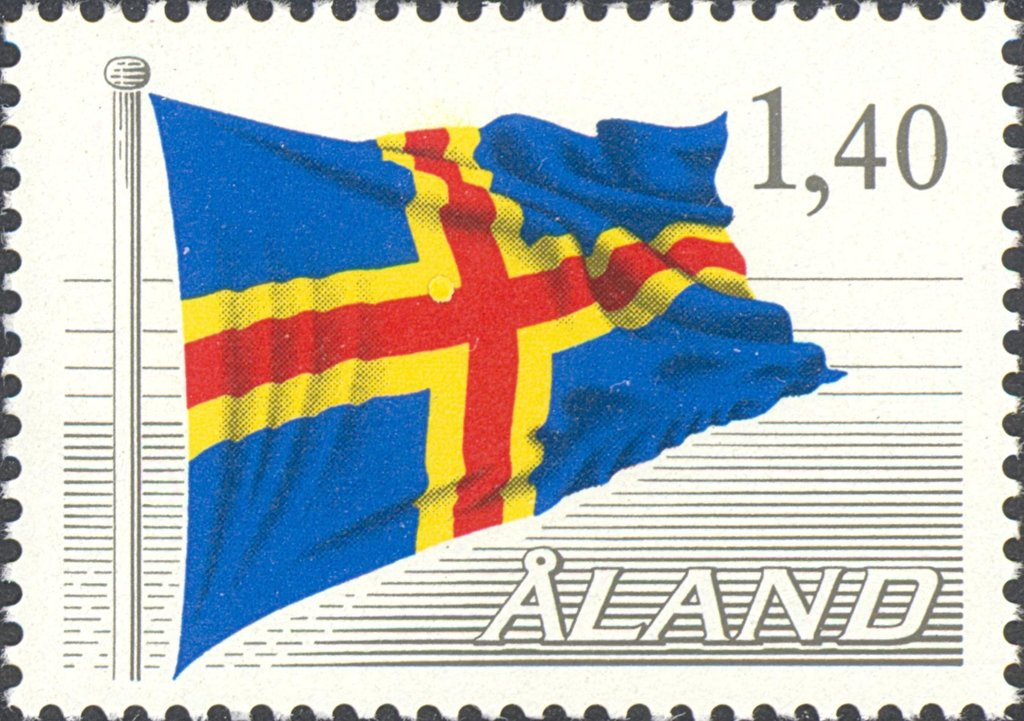
The first issued stamp of Åland

This is a survey of the postage stamps and postal history of Åland.

Åland forms an archipelago in the Baltic Sea that is an autonomous, Swedish-language-speaking region of Finland.

== First stamps ==
When the first Åland stamps were issued on 1 March 1984, it was the result of a longterm process that started already in the 1950s when Åland got its own flag in 1954. Attempts intensified in the 1970s when the Faroe Islands got their own stamps, but all applications to the postal authorities in Helsinki were rejected. The turning point came in 1979 when the Ålanders turned to the Ministry of Justice, justifying the request for their own stamps by saying they would be an important symbol of the autonomy. Finnish Minister of Justice at the time, Christoffer Taxell, took the issue further and, in 1982, President Mauno Koivisto approved the Åland Stamp Ordinance. The stamps were issued by the Posts and Telecommunications of Finland and were only valid for mail posted in Åland.

The premiere series consisted of seven stamps and five motifs: a definitive stamp series showing a fishing boat in three different colours, a commemorative stamp illustrating Åland shipping and three definitive stamps featuring a map of Åland, the Åland flag and the provincial seal.

From 1984 to 1992, the Posts and Telecommunications of Finland was responsible for the stamp production, while the motifs were produced in collaboration with the Åland provincial government and its stamp delegation. Great emphasis was placed on the connection of the motifs to Åland autonomy and history.

On 1 January 1993, a new Autonomy Act came into force, giving Åland the right to establish its own postal administration. The Åland Post took then over the production and sale of Åland stamps.

== See also ==
- Postage stamps and postal history of Finland
- Åland Post
