= Postage stamps and postal history of Yemen =

This is a survey of the postage stamps and postal history of Yemen.

Yemen is located on the Arabian Peninsula in Southwest Asia. It has an estimated population of more than 23 million people and is bordered by Saudi Arabia to the north, the Red Sea to the west, the Arabian Sea and Gulf of Aden to the south, and Oman to the east. Yemen is just under 530,000 km^{2} (200,000 sq mi) in land area. Its territory includes over 200 islands and its capital is Sana'a.

== North Yemen ==
=== Early posts ===
The first posts in Yemen were part of the Ottoman Empire postal system. After the Ottomans withdrew from Yemen there was no formal postal service, as far as is known, until the first issue of Yemeni stamps in 1926.

=== Post-Ottoman cancellation marks of Yemen ===
The Ottoman withdrawal left the Yemen without a formal postal system, or at least there is no surviving evidence of one, until the first issue of stamps in 1926. C&W and A&P mostly concern themselves with the Ottoman era and the German cancellers. Some intaglio cancels are described elsewhere though the makeshift provisional types are unexplored.

=== Hand-carried mail 1918–1926 ===
Mail, un-franked and carried privately during this period is rare: and usually attributable to Imam Yahya who maintained a royal courier post to carry his own correspondence in confidentiality (sic).or members of his immediate family. They were addressed to various, usually British, Government representatives.

=== First stamps ===
Yemen issued its first stamps in 1926. International mail required additional stamps to be added from a country that was a member of the Universal Postal Union as Yemen did not join the UPU until 1 January 1930. International mail was often routed via Aden on the Yemeni coast which was under British control at the time. Stamps of British India, as used in Aden, were added and mail cancelled ADEN CAMP. After joining the UPU, Yemen issued a new series of definitive stamps in accordance with UPU regulations.

=== Early intaglio seals 1926–1930 ===
Locally produced intaglio seals were used to cancel domestic mail franked by the first issue of Yemen in 1926. All of the First Issue Stamps of Yemen are cancelled with intaglio seals. Neither Ottoman nor German bilingual postmarks are found as principal cancel of the first issue. The intaglio cancels on the first issue vary in diameter from 20 to 31mm; the smaller, less elaborate ones tend to have been used earlier and vice versa. None are found with later 35mm intaglio cancels. McDonald states 99%+ of the many hundreds he encountered were cancelled by either Sanaa or Hodeida postmarks whereas there were potentially 30 post offices where a canceller could have been used as this is the total on the list submitted to the UPU in Yemen's application to join in 1930.

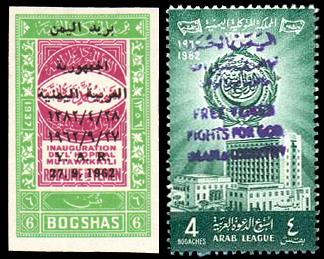
Postage stamps of Yemen overprinted by republicans and royalists during the civil war in 1962

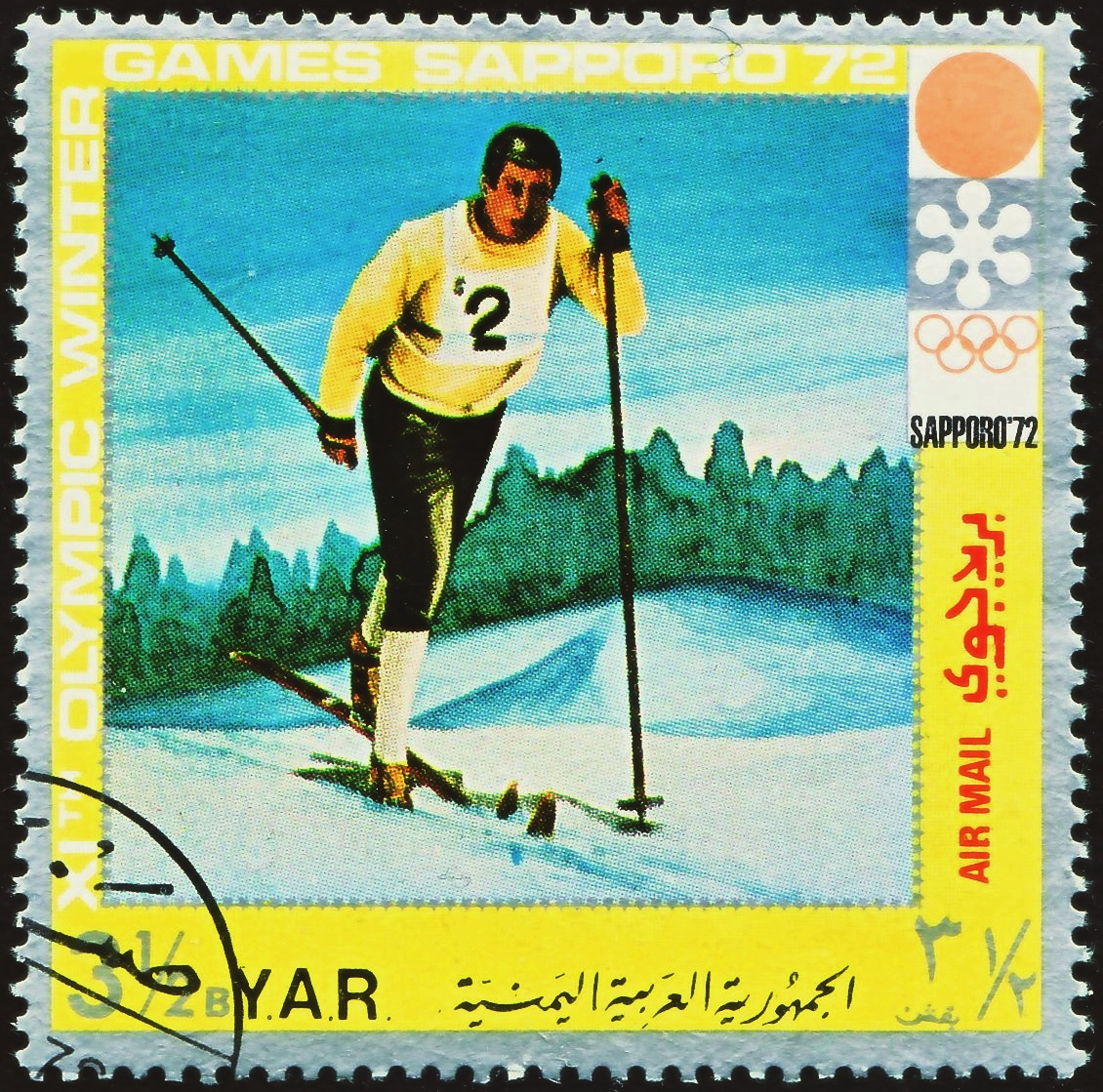
Stamp of the Yemen Arab Republic, 1971

=== Printed matter ===
Mail to foreign destinations required additional postage as Yemen was not yet a member of the UPU. With printed matter i.e. the Umm al Qura newspaper and the government gazette Al Iman to foreign destinations including Cairo, Damascus and Beirut the additional franking was usually the one Anna adhesives, though also found without additional franking. Syrians worked in Yemen in Government service.

=== Letters to Italy and its colony Eritrea ===
Mail to Italy was generated as a treaty of trade and commerce was secured and with it Italian personnel including doctors arrived in Yemen.

=== Civil war ===
During the North Yemen Civil War from 1962 to 1970, stamps were issued by both the Mutawakkilite Kingdom of Yemen and the Yemen Arab Republic. By 1968, the republicans had essentially won the war. The royalists issues continued until 1970.

== South Yemen ==
=== Colonial Aden ===
The British Crown Colony of Aden issued stamps from 1937 to 1965.

=== Federation of South Arabia ===
Aden Colony joined with Aden Protectorate to form the Federation of South Arabia and issued stamps from 1963 to 1966.

=== People's Democratic Republic ===
South Yemen became independent as the People's Republic of Southern Yemen on 30 November 1967, and was renamed the People's Democratic Republic of Yemen in 1970.

== Unification ==
North Yemen and South Yemen unified on 22 May 1990 to form the present-day Yemen. Today, Yemen has a range of modern postal services run by the General Corporation for Post and Postal Saving.

== See also ==
- Postage stamps and postal history of Aden
