= Postage stamps and postal history of Brunei =

This is a survey of the postage stamps and postal history of Brunei.

Brunei is located on the north coast of the island of Borneo, in Southeast Asia. Its coastline with the South China Sea is the only portion that is not bounded by another country; the state of Sarawak, Malaysia, surrounds the country and it is divided into two portion by Limbang, which is part of Sarawak.

== First stamps ==
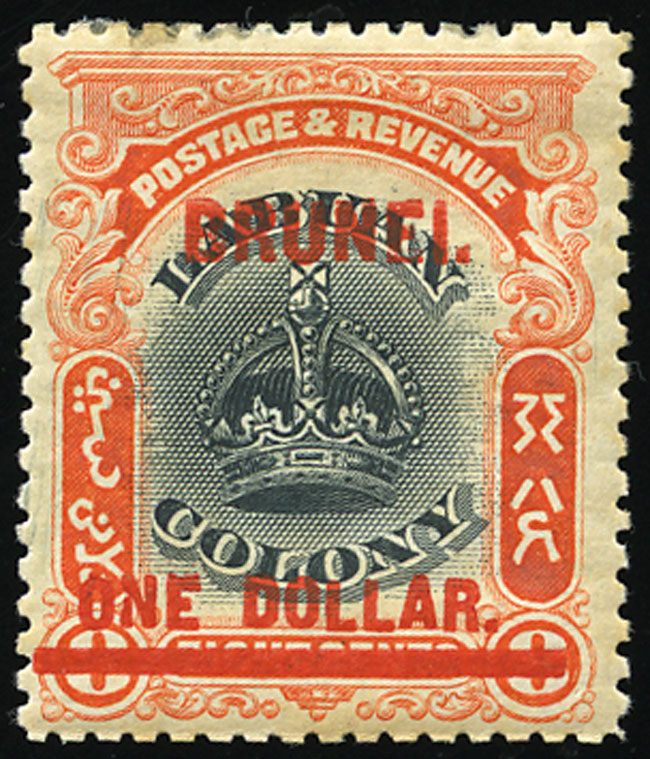
Stamp of Labuan overprinted for Brunei, 1906

The first stamps of Brunei were the 1895 "Star and crescent" set, long considered to bogus but subsequently shown to be genuine, although valid only for mail within the state and to Sarawak and Labuan.

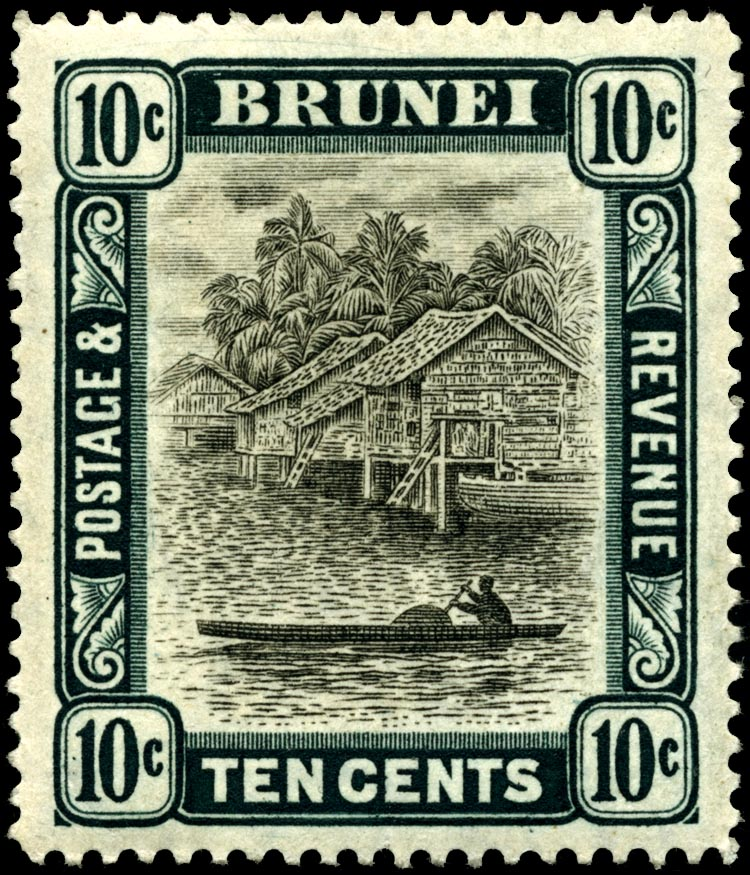
Brunei 10c stamp of 1907

== Overprints ==
In 1906 stamps of Labuan came into use, overprinted BRUNEI.

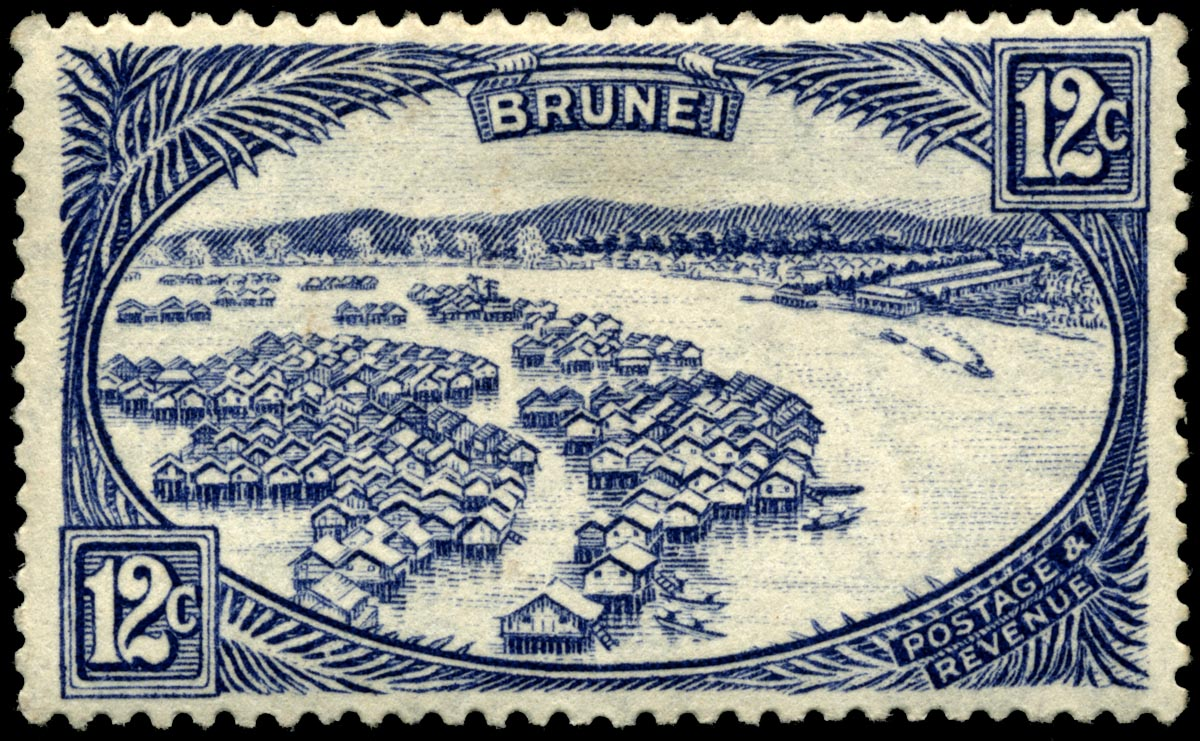
Brunei 12c stamp of 1924

== Brunei river stamps ==
In 1907 a set inscribed "BRUNEI POSTAGE & REVENUE" was issued showing a boat on the River Brunei. This set remained in use until 1949 during which time it went through many different printings.

== World War II ==
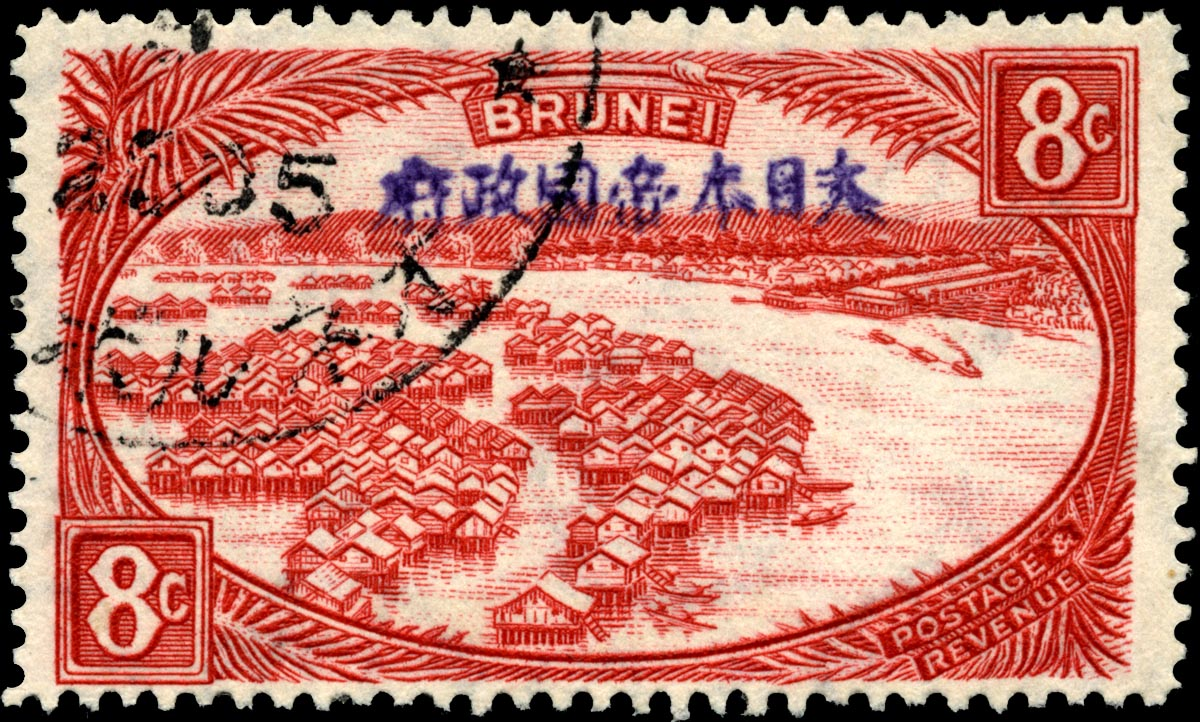
A stamp issued during the Japanese occupation of Brunei, 1942

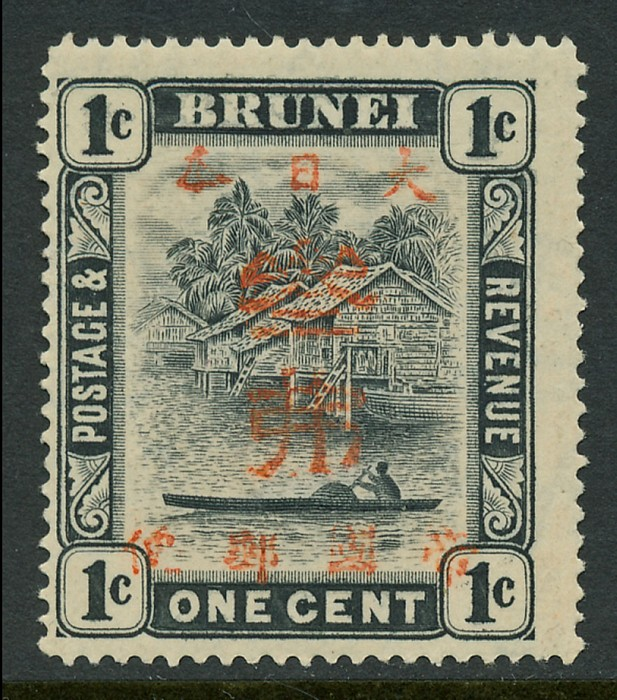
A stamp issued during the Japanese occupation of Brunei, 1944

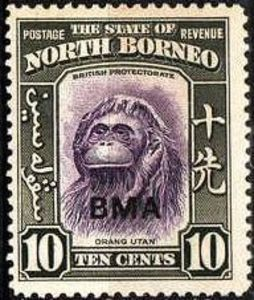
Stamp of North Borneo, overprint "BMA" (British Military Administration), 1945

Brunei was occupied by the Japanese forces in January 1942 until liberation in June 1945. During the occupation, overprinted and un-overprinted stamps of Brunei were used as well as stamps of Japan.

Following liberation, stamps of North Borneo and Sarawak were overprinted "BMA" (British Military Administration).

== Post-war ==
A new set of definitives was issued on 2 January 1947. In 1949 a set was issued celebrating Sultan Ahmed Tajudin's Silver Jubilee. Also in 1949 Brunei issued stamps for the 75th anniversary of the founding of the Universal Postal Union as part of a British Commonwealth omnibus issue.

In 1952 a new series of definitive stamps were issued featuring Sultan Omar Ali Saifuddin which was another long-running series lasting until 1972.

Regular commemorative and definitive stamp issues have continued since then.

== Independence ==
Since independence on 1 January 1984, Brunei has issued stamps inscribed as "Brunei Darussalam".

== Revenue stamps ==
Brunei never issued revenue-only stamps, since dual-purpose postage and revenue stamps were valid for fiscal use. High value stamps such as the $25 from the Brunei river series were intended for fiscal purposes but were technically also valid for postage.

== See also ==
- Brunei Postal Services Department
- Postal codes in Brunei
