= Postage stamps and postal history of Jordan =

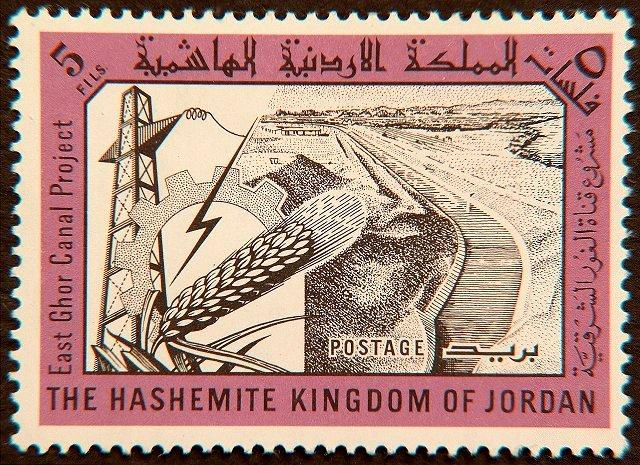
A 1963 stamp of Jordan

This is a survey of the postage stamps and postal history of Jordan, formerly Transjordan.

== Early post ==
Jordan was part of the Turkish Empire until 1918 and a number of Turkish post offices existed in the area.

== British occupation ==
Stamps of the Egyptian Expeditionary Force were valid in Transjordan, Palestine, Cilicia, Syria, and Lebanon from 1918. In 1920, E.E.F. stamps overprinted "East of Jordan" in Arabic were issued for Transjordan.

== First stamps ==
A 1928 stamp of Transjordan overprinted "Constitution" commemorating the enactment of the first Constitution of Transjordan

Transjordan became part of the League of Nations mandate for the territories of Palestine in 1922. Postal service was set up after the establishment of the Emirate of Transjordan, and started taking over the postal service that was run by the Ottoman Empire. The first stamps for the Emirate were E.E.F. stamps overprinted with the inscription "Arab Government of the East" in Arabic. Further overprints were also made with the stamps of Hejaz. The first set of definitives bearing the image of Emir Abdullah was issued In 1927.

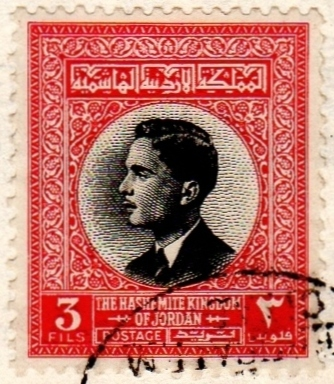
King Hussein on a 1959 stamp

== Independence ==
Transjordan remained a British mandate until 1946. On 25 May 1946, the Emirate became the "Hashemite Kingdom of Transjordan", achieving full independence on 17 June 1946. In 1949, it was renamed the "Hashemite Kingdom of Jordan". By 2019, Jordan had issued 2,667 stamps.

== Palestine issues ==
Jordan provided the postal stamps for the West Bank with East part of Jerusalem that were occupied by Jordan between 1948 and 1967. Prior to the incorporation of the West Bank into Jordan in 1950, Jordanian stamps overprinted "Palestine" in Arabic and English were issued from 1948 until April 1950. After 1950, stamps of Jordan were used in the West Bank until the territory came under Israeli control in 1967.

== See also ==
- Jordan Post Company
- Postage stamps and postal history of Palestine
