= Postage stamps and postal history of the postal convention states of India =

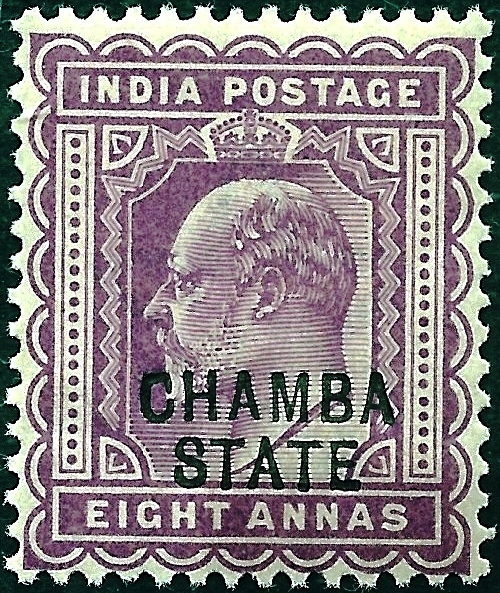
A typical convention state postage stamp is a British India issue overprinted with the state's name

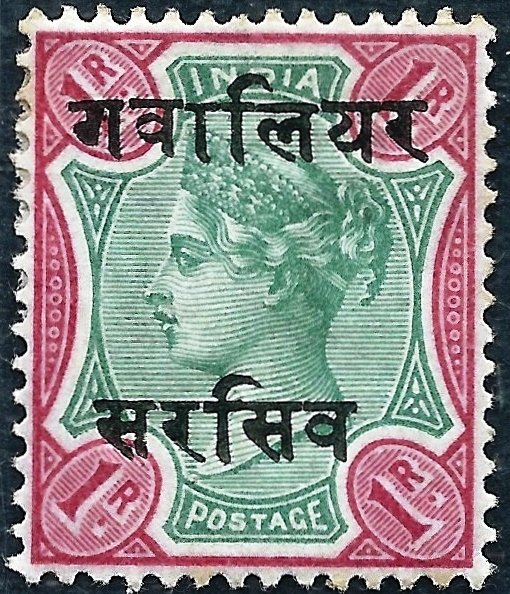
Error in Devanagari script on an 1896 Victoria head of Gwalior

The Post Office of India of the British Raj entered into postal conventions with a few native states of India. As per the postal convention (or agreement), existing adhesive stamps and postal stationery of British India were overprinted with the name of the state for use within each convention State, for mail from one convention state to another, and to destinations in British India. The state administrations, in turn, had to conform to a number of agreements covering the issuance of stamps, the rates of postage, and the exchange of mail.

For philatelic purposes such states were referred to as convention states as distinct from the feudatory states which had no postal agreement with British India. The feudatory states issued their own stamps, the postage validity of which was within the borders of the state itself. The collection of convention states is considered to be a part of classical philately as they are plain, unembellished, produced to order for bona fide use and under conditions strictly-controlled by the British Government.

== Convention states of India ==
The convention states of India were:

- Chamba (1887–1948)
- Faridkot (feudatory 1879–1887; convention 1887–1901)
- Gwalior (1885–1948)
- Jind (feudatory 1874–1885; convention 1885–1948)
- Nabha (1885–1948)
- Patiala (1884–1947)

Of these princely states, Chamba was located in the Himalayas, Gwalior was a central Indian state and the other four were cis-Sutlej states located in the east Punjab. The four Punjabi states were closely allied and were referred to as "Phulkian" states; Jind, Nabha and Patiala having been formed in the eighteenth century by descendants of Chaudhary Phul Singh of the Sidhu-Barar clan while Faridkot was founded by a related family. The states had close relations with the British during the time of Ranjit Singh which wavered in some cases during the Anglo-Sikh Wars. During the 1857 Rebellion and later, the states proved their loyalty and enjoyed British patronage. Such states enjoyed greater advantages from the British Raj, the signing of the postal conventions being considered one of them. The close alliance of the convention states to the British crown also be seen from the fact that all six convention states were salute states – 21 guns were entitled in the protocollary cannon or gun salute in the case of Gwalior, seventeen for Patiala, thirteen in the cases of Jind and Nabha and eleven for Chamba and Faridkot.

The first Convention State was Patiala, in 1884, followed by others in the next few years. The stamps of the convention states all became invalid on 1 January 1951, when they were replaced by the stamps of the independent Republic of India, valid from 1 Jan 1950.

Both Faridkot and Jind, as feudatory states, had issued their own stamps before they joined the Postal Convention. Jind joined in July, 1885; its stamps from the feudatory period became invalid for postage, but they continued to be used for revenue purposes. Faridkot joined on 1 January 1887.

== Postal conventions ==
The postal conventions signed by each state were almost identical in their provisions:

As per the terms of the convention, each party thereto recognises the franking power within its own territory of the postage stamps issued by the other party, provided that they are of the nature laid down in the convention. These conventions further bind the Government of India to supply these States, on indent, with stamps current in British India surcharged with the name of the indenting State. The charge made to the latter for this service is the actual price paid by the Government of India to the contractors in England for printing the stamps, plus the freight to India, and the actual cost of surcharging. No profit is made on the transaction.

— Sir Charles Stewart-Wilson, British Indian Adhesive Stamps surcharged for Native States, Vol I.

In practice, the convention states were supplied with British Indian postage stamps (the majority of stamps supplied depicted the monarch's head), which were overprinted in the name of the state and also the word 'SERVICE' in case of official stamps. The rates of charging for postage services were in tune with that of British India.

=== Production ===
The postage stamps were produced by the British Raj following due bureaucratic process. Most of the stamps are monarch heads as pictorial commemoratives had not been brought into use till the 1920s. Proofs were produced by the Govt Central Press, Calcutta, on orders of the Director General Post Office. The initial proofs were sent to the princely state concerned for approval. Sometimes, as in the case of Jind, the state desired that a representation of the coat of the arms also be included; however the proposals fell through on grounds of economy as they represented considerable additional expense to the state. Following the approval, printing of issues was carried out. The typescript changed often and various type faces are found for each convention state. Though the stamps were produced under close supervision, the manual processes of printing introduced a variety of errors and misprints which are today of considerable value.

The printing process is described by Stewart-Wilson:

They are produced under the following conditions :-

The surcharging is done in Calcutta at the Government of India Central Printing Press, under conditions of supervision etc., which make underhand dealings impossible. The stamps to be surcharged are supplied by the Superintendent of Stamps and Stationery under special precautions, and a like number have to be returned to him after receiving the surcharge. The employees cannot bring into the office, or introduce extraneous matter, such as unused stamps bought for the purpose, into the machines; and cannot manipulate the setting of the surcharge when once passed.

All work done by human beings is liable to a want of accuracy. This is specially the case when the human beings are Orientals not sufficiently educated to have lost the queer belief that want of accuracy is absolutely essential to avert the dreaded "Evil Eye." Further, the chance of error which occurs in one setting of type is greatly increased when that type has to be set 240 times, as it has to be for every supply of surcharged star-watermarked stamps. And when we remember that these 240 settings have to be made not once, but often and at varying intervals of time, it is hardly wonderful that mistakes do occur. There are some mistakes which will occur, no matter what care is taken. Type will break while in use, and minute portions of a letter will now and then take up too much or too little ink....

...but a genuine collector despises such deviations.

— Sir Charles Stewart-Wilson, British Indian Adhesive Stamps surcharged for Native States, Vol I.

== Chamba ==
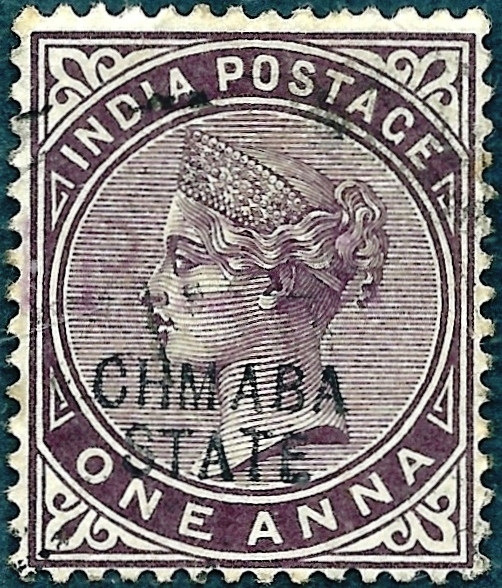
One anna Victoria head of Chamba, 1897

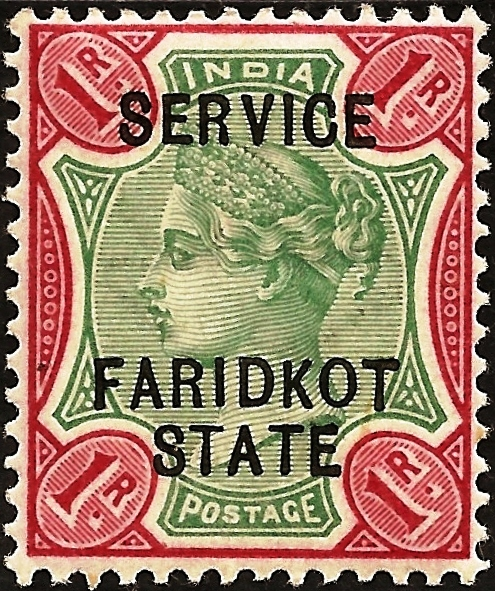
One rupee Victoria head of Faridkot, 1898

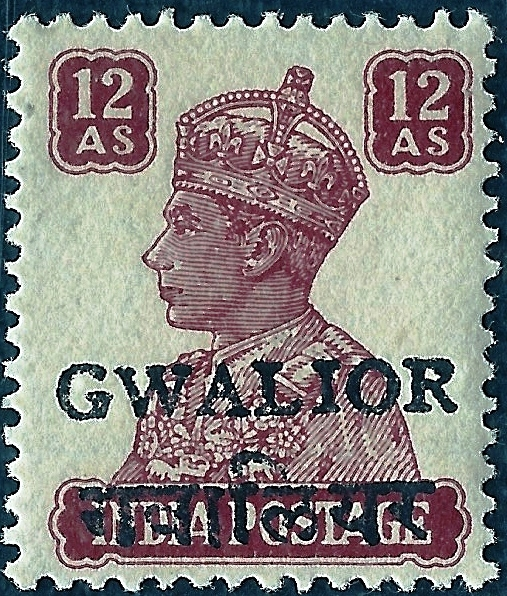
Twelve annas George VI head of Gwalior, 1949

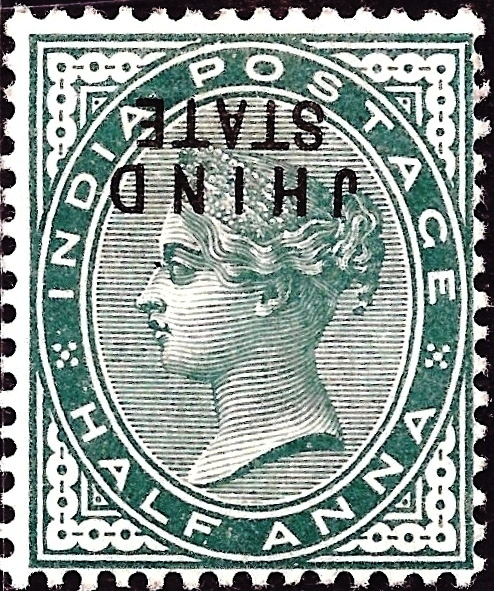
Half-anna Victoria head of Jind, 1899

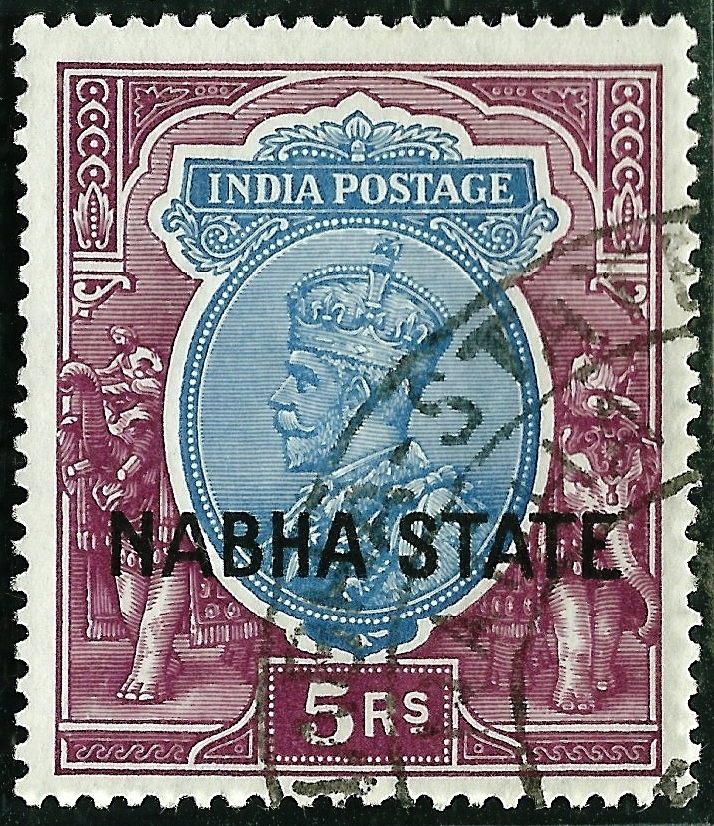
Five rupee George V head of Nabha, 1932

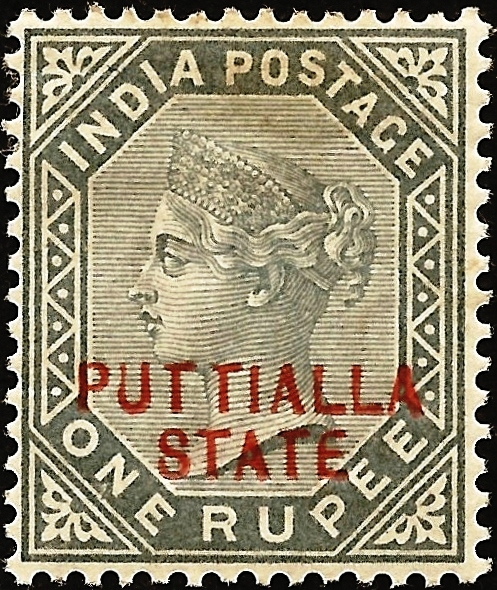
One rupee Victoria head of Patiala, 1885

Chamba was a princely state in the Himalayas, located in present-day Himachal Pradesh state of northern India (32.57 N 76.13 E). A rural Hill state under the political control of the British Government of the Punjab, it was situated between the territories of Kashmir and the Punjab districts of Kangra and Gurdaspur. Chamba State had a postal convention with British India from 1887 onwards and issued stamps till 1947.

Chamba convention state stamps can viewed at Bhuri Singh Museum in Chamba and the Postal Museum in Canada.

Chamba issued a total of 120 stamps and 86 official stamps from 1885 till 15 April 1948 when it became part of the Indian state of Himachal Pradesh.

== Faridkot ==
Faridkot, a state in the Punjab, was the second princely state to sign a postal convention with the Post Office of India and the smallest of all the Punjabi convention states. Predominantly agricultural it had an area of 634 square miles (1,600 km^{2}) and population of just 115,040 in 1898. Ruled by a Sikh dynasty from 1763 onwards, the ruler at the time of the postal convention was Raja Bikram Singh.

Faridkot is one of the two convention states which had issued stamps independently from 1879 to January 1887 when it signed a postal convention. Accordingly, the postal history of Faridkot state is considered separately for its issues as a feudatory state for that period from its postal history as a convention state. It ceased to use overprinted stamps after 31 Mar 1901. Consequently, all Faridkot stamps bear the bust of Queen Victoria.

As a convention state, Faridkot issued 17 stamps and 15 official stamps. It had the shortest period of issue, and also issued less stamps than any convention state.

== Gwalior ==
Largest of the princely states located in Central India, Gwalior signed a postal convention on 1 Jul 1885. It possessed an efficient postal system with its headquarters at the capital city of Lashkar (present day Gwalior city) on the same principles as the Imperial British Indian Post Office. Like all convention states, Gwalior used British India postage stamps overprinted at first at the Government of India Central Printing Press, Calcutta till 1926 and later at the Security Press in Nashik. Like the stamps of the other states, Gwalior's stamp issues have a rich collection of errors and varieties. Gwalior was also unusual in that its overprinting consisted of the word 'Gwalior' alone and the suffix 'state', as used in all other convention states, was never used.

Gwalior issued a total of 137 stamps and 94 official stamps from 1885 till 1949.

== Jind ==
Jind was another of the cis-Sutlej states which signed a postal convention on 1 July 1885. Having an area of just 1,333 square miles (3,500 km^{2}), the territory of Jind, like all the Phulkian states, was fragmented; comprising three main enclaves and some isolated villages. The Sikh ruler of Jind, Raja Ranbir Singh was a minor at the time of signing of the postal convention; the state being ruled by a Council of Regency at that point in time.

Prior to becoming a convention state, Jind issued stamps as a feudatory state from 1864 to 1885. The philatelic history of Jind is usually dealt with differently for each of the periods. The spelling of 'Jind' on the surcharge has changed from time to time and overprints have been spelt as 'JIND', 'JHIND', and 'JEEND' in addition to 'JEIND' as an error variety.

During its period as a convention state, Jind issued a total of 149 stamps and 86 official stamps from 1885 till 20 Aug 1948 when it was absorbed into the Patiala and East Punjab states union.

== Nabha ==
Nabha was a small princely convention state in the Punjab ruled by a Sikh dynasty from the "Phulkian" lineage. The territory of Nabha, 966 square miles (2,500 km^{2}) consisted of twelve enclaves scattered amongst the tracts of land belonging to Patiala and Jind and the enclave of Bawal to the southeast. The ruler of Nabha, at the time of signing the convention was Raja Hira Singh (1843–1911).

The realm maintained 15 post offices, controlled by a postmaster general, and connecting main lines. Though Nabha was a rural state, it was notable for having twice the number of literate people as neighbouring Jind even though they had almost equal populations.

Nabha issued a total of 117 stamps and 68 official stamps from 1885 till 20 Aug 1948 when it was absorbed into the Patiala and East Punjab states union.

== Patiala ==
Patiala was a princely state in the Punjab. The largest, wealthiest and most populous of the Phulkian states, it had the highest precedence amongst them. Patiala was the first of the Phulkian states to sign a postal convention which it did on 1 October 1884. The convention was later modified in 1900. At the time of the signing of the convention, the ruler Maharaja Rajendra Singh, was a minor and the state administered by a Council of Regency.

Under an earlier agreement conducted in 1872, a telegraph line from Ambala to Patiala was constructed by the British at the expense of the state, which collected the receipts and taxes therefrom for the maintenance of that telegraph line.

Typical of the Phulkian states, the territory of Patiala state consisted of three separate enclaves including a number of villages interspersed in the territory of Nabha, Jind and Maler Kotla; including the British Indian districts of Karnal, Ferozepore and Ludhiana.

Patiala issued a total of 115 stamps and 84 official stamps from 1884 till 20 Aug 1948 when it was absorbed into the Patiala and East Punjab states union.

== Convention states philately ==
Convention states philately is an obscure branch of classical Indian philately. The scope of stamps is relatively small but a large variety of errors and changes in printing settings for different batches provide adequate scope for philately. However, due to the nature of the stamps (overprinting on British Indian stamps of the period), Indian convention state philately faces problems of forgeries, especially in high values and errors.
