= Para (currency) =

Former currency of several historical and present-day countries in Eurasia

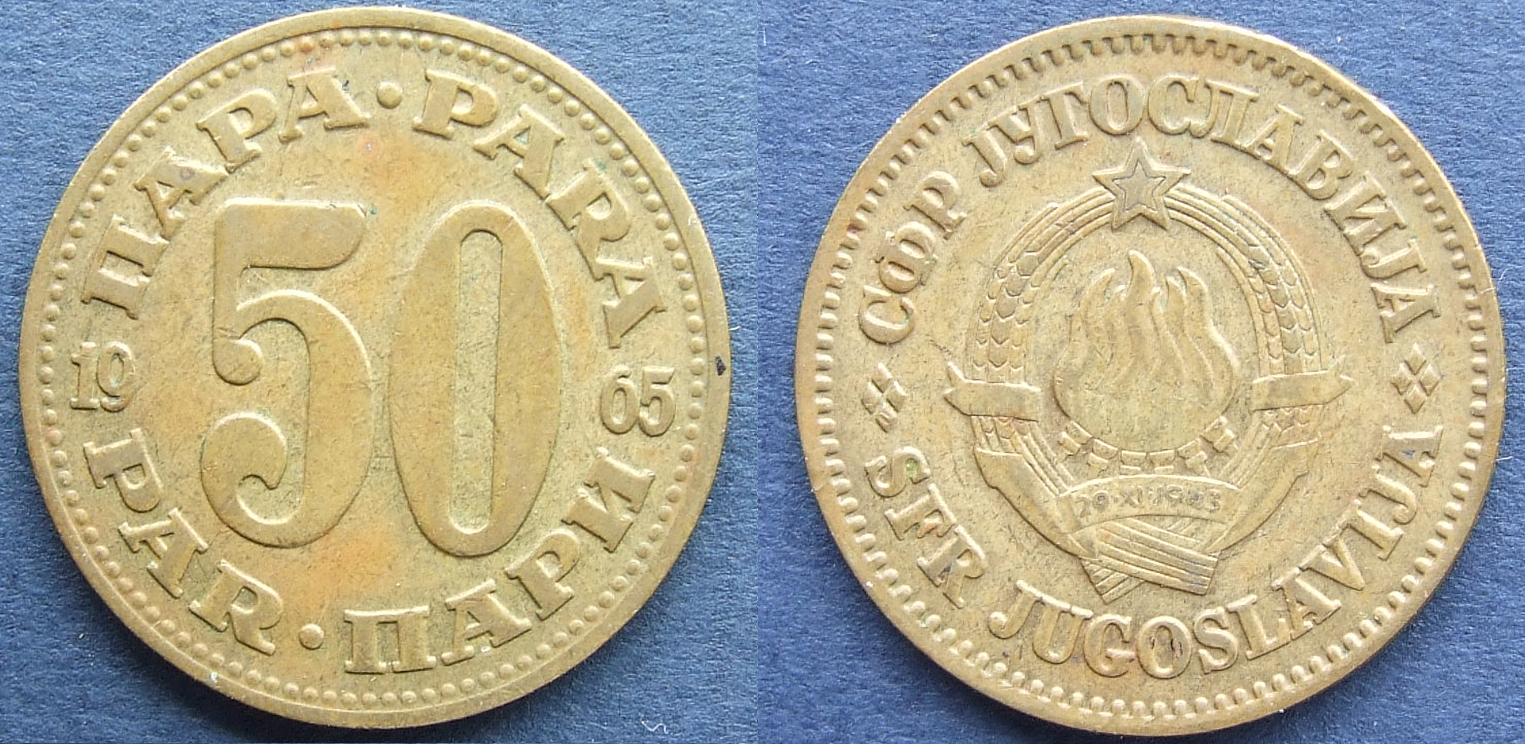
50 para of 1965

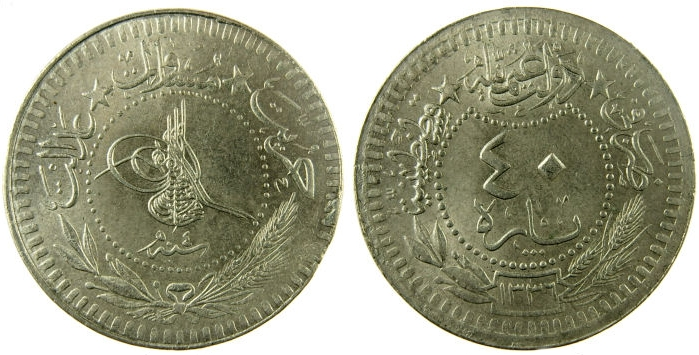
40 Ottoman para of Mehmed VI, 1918 AD

The para (Ottoman Turkish: پاره, romanized: para; from Persian: پاره, romanized: pâre, meaning 'piece') was a unit of former currencies of the Ottoman Empire, Turkey, Egypt, Montenegro, Albania, Serbia and Montenegro, Yugoslavia and Serbia.

In 1524, the Ottoman law code of Egypt (kanunname) referred to the Mamluk Egyptian coin medin as pare and set its value as 2 1/2 dirham. Since 1640 the value of para was settled relative to Ottoman currency, at 3 akçe. In the 16th and 17th centuries pare were minted in many parts of the empire, in Asia and north Africa. In 1688 the Ottoman kuruş was introduced, equalling 40 para. In 1844, a kuruş was, in turn, 1/100 of the newly introduced Ottoman lira.

The modern Turkish lira is only divided into kuruş.

In Serbia, the para was the subunit of the Serbian dinar since the 19th century. The Montenegrin perper was subdivided into 100 pare during its brief existence between 1906 and 1918. In Albania, the para was used as a currency before the introduction of the lek in 1926.

In Albanian, Kurdish, Greek, Bulgarian, Macedonian, Mandaic, Romanian, Serbo-Croatian (пара) and Turkish, para or its plural παράδες, pari, pare, parale, parai, paraja or paralar is a generic term for money.
