= Compendium of postage stamp issuers (H) =

Each "article" in this category is a collection of entries about several stamp issuers, presented in alphabetical order. The entries are formulated on the micro model and so provide summary information about all known issuers.

See the Category:Compendium of postage stamp issuers page for details of the project.

== Hadhramaut ==
Refer
Qu'Aiti State in Hadhramaut

== Haiti ==
Dates
1881 –
Capital
Port-au-Prince
Currency
100 centimes = 1 gourde

Main Article
Postage stamps and postal history of Haiti

== Hamburg ==
Dates
1859–1867
Currency
16 schillings = 1 mark

Refer
German States

== Hanover ==
Dates
1850–1866
Currency
(1850) 12 pfennige = 1 gutegroschen; 24 gutengroschen = 1 thaler
(1858) 10 pfennigs = 1 groschen; 30 groschen = 1 thaler

Refer
German States

== Hatay ==
Dates
1938–1939
Capital
Alexandretta
Currency
(1938) 100 centimes = 1 piastre
(1938) 100 santims = 40 paras = 1 kuru

Main article
Postage stamps and postal history of Hatay

== Haute Volta ==
Refer
Upper Volta

== Hawaii ==
Dates
1851–1898
Capital
Honolulu
Currency
100 cents = 1 dollar

Main Article
Postage stamps and postal history of Hawaii

== Heilungkiang ==
Refer
Kirin & Heilungkiang

== Hejaz ==
Dates
1916–1926
Capital
Mecca
Currency
40 paras = 1 piastre

Refer
Saudi Arabia

See also
Hejaz-Nejd

== Hejaz-Nejd ==
Dates
1926–1932
Capital
Riyadh
Currency
(1926) 40 paras = 1 piastre
(1929) 110 guerche = 10 riyal = 1 gold sovereign

Refer
Saudi Arabia

See also
Hejaz

== Heligoland ==
Dates
1867–1890
Capital
Currency
(1867) 16 schillings = 1 mark
(1875) 100 pfennige = 1 mark

== Hellas ==
Refer
Greece

== Helvetia ==
Refer
Switzerland

== Herm ==
Refer
Channel Islands

== Herzegovina ==
Refer
Bosnia & Herzegovina

== Hoi-Hao (Indochinese Post Office) ==
Dates
1902–1922
Currency
(1902) 100 centimes = 1 franc
(1918) 100 cents = 1 piastre

Refer
China (Indochinese Post Offices)

== Holkar ==
Refer
Indore

== Holland ==
Refer
Netherlands

== Holstein ==
Dates
1864–1867
Capital
Kiel
Currency
16 schilling = 1 mark

Refer
German States

== Honduras ==
Dates
1866 –
Capital
Tegucigalpa
Currency
(1866) 8 reales = 1 peso
(1878) 100 centavos = 1 peso
(1933) 100 centavos = 1 lempira

Main Article
Postage stamps and postal history of Honduras

== Hong Kong ==
Dates
1862 –
Capital
Victoria
Currency
100 cents = 1 dollar
Main article
Postage stamps and postal history of Hong Kong

== Hong Kong (Japanese occupation) ==
Dates
1945 only
Currency
100 rin = 1 sen; 100 sen = 1 yen

Refer
Japanese Occupation Issues

== Horta ==
Dates
1892–1905
Capital
Currency
1000 reis = 1 milreis

Refer
Azores Territories

== Horthy Regime ==
Refer
Szeged

== Hrvatska ==
Refer
Croatia

== Hungary ==
Dates
1871 –
Capital
Budapest
Currency
(1871) 100 krajczar = 1 forint
(1900) 100 Fillér (heller) = 1 korona (krone)
(1926) 100 Fillér = 1 pengo
(1946) 100 Fillér = 1 forint

Main Article
Postage stamps and postal history of Hungary

See also
Szeged

== Hungary (French occupation) ==
Refer
Arad (French Occupation)

== Hungary (Romanian occupation) ==
Dates
1919–1920
Currency
100 Fillér = 1 korona

Refer
Romanian Post Abroad

== Hungary (Serbian occupation) ==
Dates
1919 only
Currency
100 Fillér = 1 korona

Refer
Serbian Occupation Issues

== Hyderabad ==
Dates
1869–1948
Currency
12 pies = 1 anna; 16 annas = 1 rupee

Refer
Indian Native States

== Bibliography ==
- Stanley Gibbons Ltd, Europe and Colonies 1970, Stanley Gibbons Ltd, 1969
- Stanley Gibbons Ltd, various catalogues
- Stuart Rossiter & John Flower, The Stamp Atlas, W H Smith, 1989
- XLCR Stamp Finder and Collector's Dictionary, Thomas Cliffe Ltd, c.1960
