= Postage stamps and postal history of Syria =

This is a survey of the postage stamps and postal history of Syria.

Syria, is a country in Western Asia, bordering Lebanon and the Mediterranean Sea to the west, Turkey to the north, Iraq to the east, Jordan to the south, and Israel to the southwest. The French were awarded a mandate to govern Syria at the Paris Peace conference of 1918 and Syria attained independence in April 1946, as a parliamentary republic.

== Early postal arrangements ==
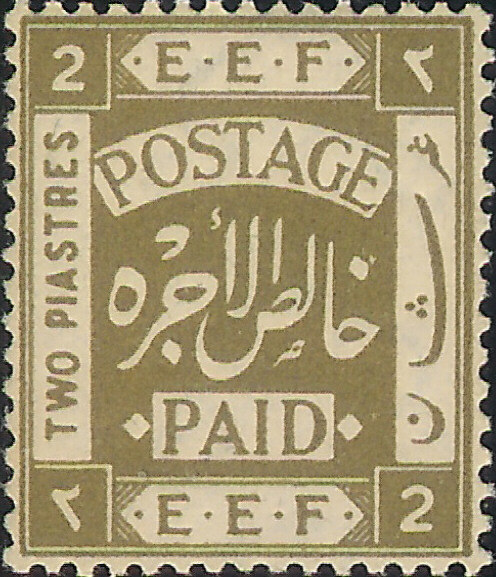
A mint stamp of the Egyptian Expeditionary Force available at EEF post offices in Syria

Syria was part of the Ottoman Empire until the defeat of the Ottomans in the First World War and an extensive network of Imperial Ottoman post offices operated in the region. A French post office operated between 1852 and 1914, and an Egyptian office at Latakia from 1870 to 1872. Syria used the stamps of the Ottoman Empire from 1883 until 1919.

== Egyptian Expeditionary Force ==
Stamps of the British Egyptian Expeditionary Force were available in Syria between 23 September 1918 and 23 February 1922.

== Syrian Arab Kingdom ==
In 1920 Emir Faisal of the Hejaz organised an Arab Kingdom in central Syria in rebellion against French control. On 8 March 1920 Faisal was proclaimed King of Syria. During this period stamps of Turkey from 1913 to 1919 were overprinted in Damascus with the Arabic seal Al Hukuma Al Arabia 'Arab Government' and some of the stamps surcharged in Egyptian currency. After Faisal was proclaimed King, a set of stamps was issued by the Arabian Government of Syria, and one of the set, the 5 milliemes, pink, overprinted in Arabic with green ink, "In commemoration of the independence of Syria. Adar (March) 8th 1920." The overprinted Turkish provisionals continued in use for about two months and were used conjunctively with stamps of the E.E.F. and regular Syrian issues.

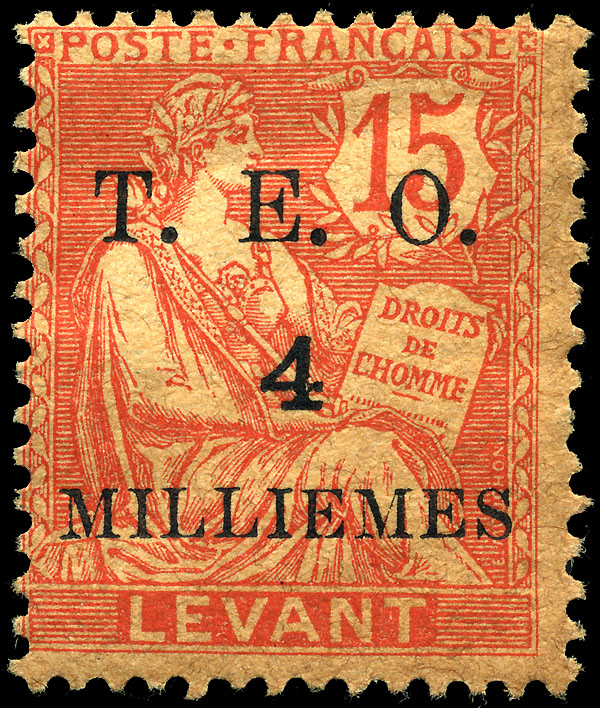
A French colonies key type stamp of Levant overprinted T.E.O. for use during the French military occupation of Syria and Lebanon between 1920 and 1922

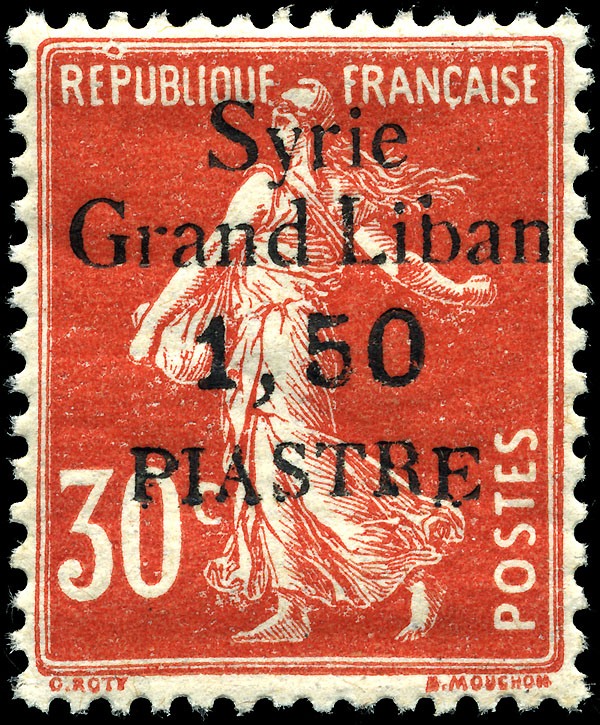
A "sower" stamp of France overprinted for use in Syria and Lebanon in 1923 during the period of the French Mandate

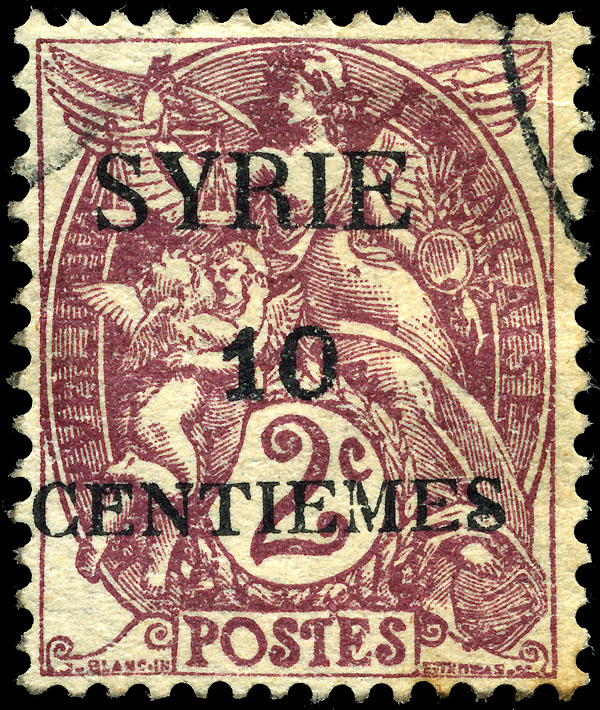
A stamp of France overprinted for use in Syria, 1924

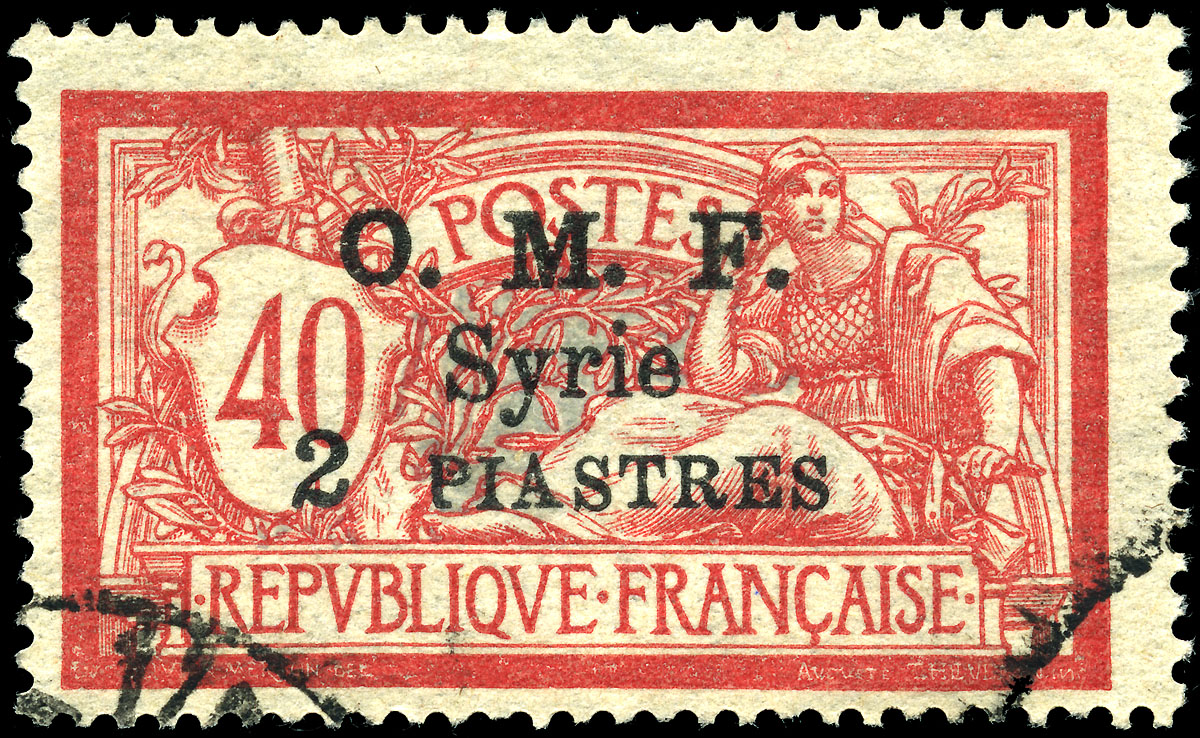
A French Merson type stamp overprinted O.M.F. for use during the French military occupation of Syria and Lebanon

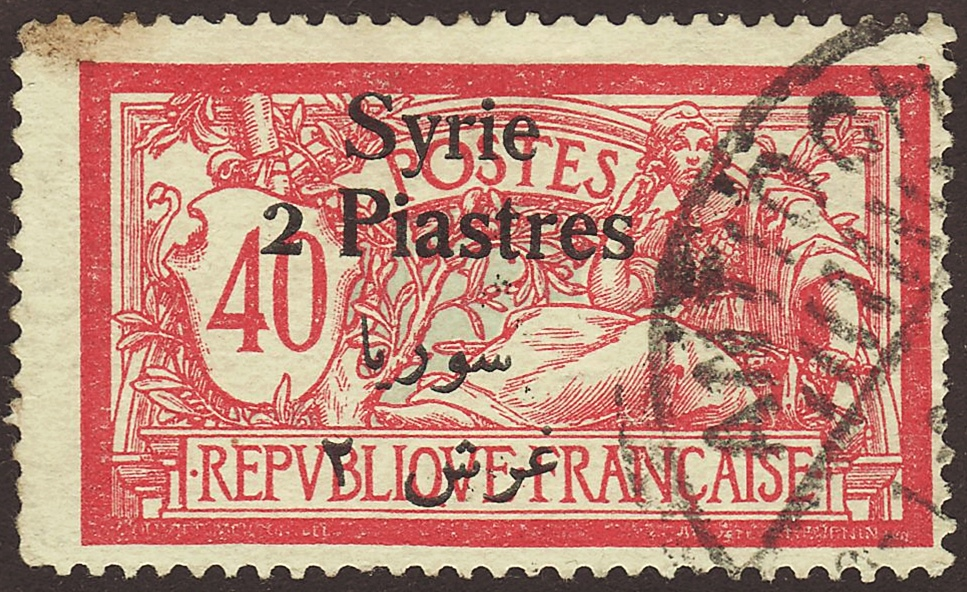
A French Merson type stamp overprinted for use in Syria, 1924

== French military occupation ==
In July 1920 King Faisal was dethroned by the French and a mandate was granted to France by the League of Nations over the whole of Syria from 1923. Following the awarding of the mandate and the defeat of Syrian forces in May 1920, Syria came under French military occupation. Syria got divided between a coastal area with a capital at Beirut, which subsequently became Lebanon, and the interior under the control of the Arabs with a capital at Damascus. Stamps of France were used between 1920 and 1922 overprinted T.E.O. (Territoires Ennemis Occupés) or O.M.F. (Occupation Militaire Francaise).

== French Mandate ==
As a League of Nations mandate, Syria used the stamps of France, overprinted Syrie Grand Liban in 1923.

The postal administrations for Syria and Lebanon were separated in 1924, and the stamps of France overprinted Syrie were issued for Lebanon. From 1925 Syria had its own stamps marked Syrie.

== Syrian Republic ==
The Syrian Republic was formed in 1930 as a component of the Mandate for Syria and the Lebanon. From 1934 stamps marked Republique Syrienne were in use, changing later to just Syrie.

== Independence ==
Syria became de facto independent in April 1946.

== United Arab Republic ==
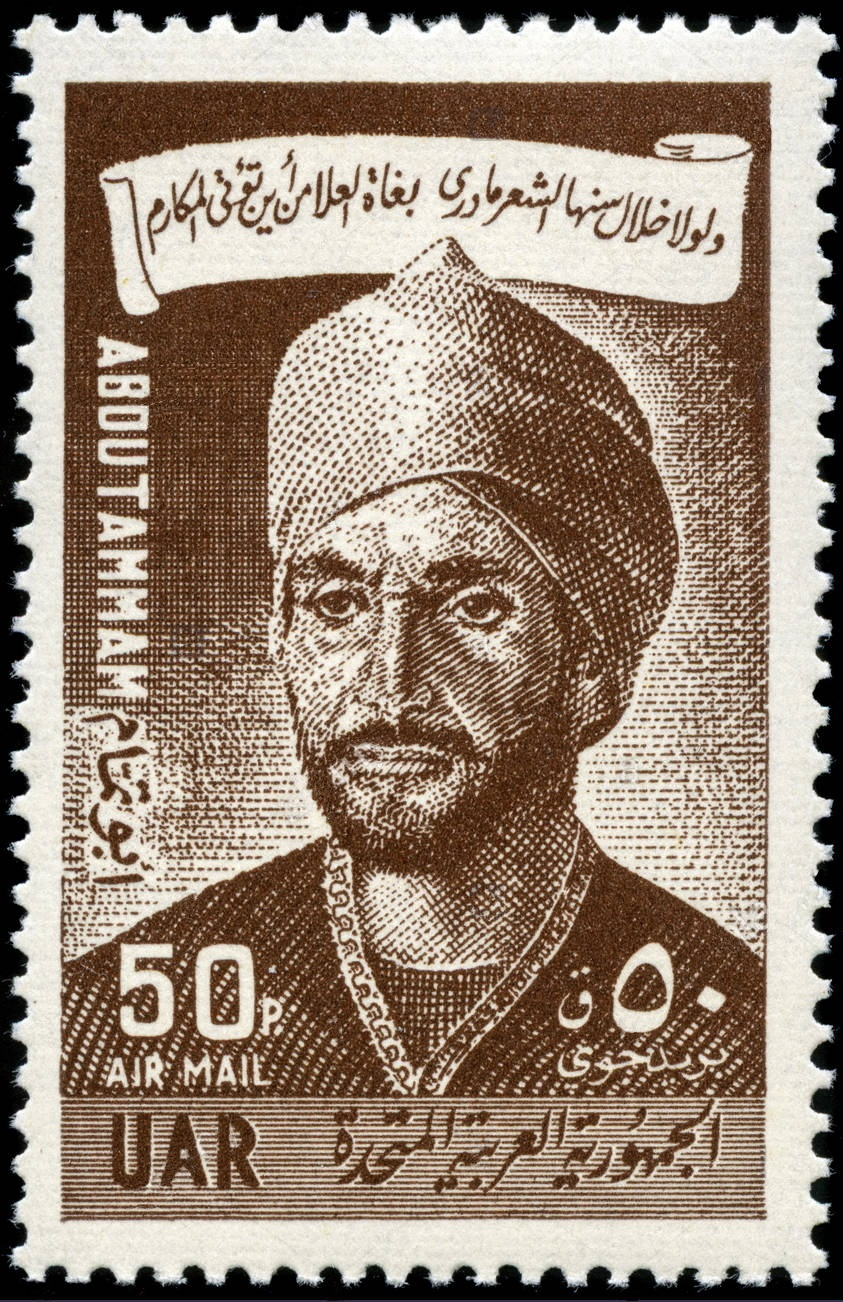
An UAR stamp issued by Syria

On 1 February 1958 Syria and Egypt united to form the United Arab Republic and stamps marked UAR were used.

== Syrian Arab Republic ==
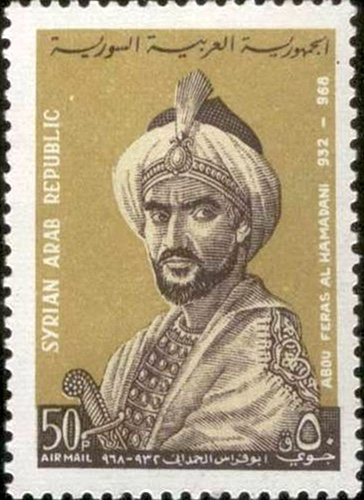
A 1963 Syrian postage stamp depicting the great 10th-century poet Abu Firas al-Hamdani

On 28 September 1961 Syria left the UAR and became the Syrian Arab Republic and stamps have been marked first under that name, then Syrian A.R. or just Syria since then.

== See also ==
- Postage stamps and postal history of Lebanon
- Postage stamps and postal history of Alawite State
- Postage stamps and postal history of Hatay
