= Australian Antarctic Territory =

Australian territorial claim on East Antarctica

- External territory
- Flag

- Map of Antarctica indicating Australian territorial claim (red area)
- Sovereign state: Australia
- Claim transferred to Australia: 1933
- Main base and administrative centre: Davis Station; 68°34′36″S 77°58′03″E
- Official languages: English
- Government: Dependency under a constitutional monarchy
  - Monarch: Charles III
  - Governor-General: Sam Mostyn
  - Minister responsible: Murray Watt

Area
  - Total: 5,896,500 km^{2} (2,276,700 sq mi)
- Highest elevation: 3,490 m (11,450 ft)

Population
  - Estimate: less than 1,000
- Currency: Australian dollar (AU$) (AUD)
- Calling code: +672 1x
- Internet TLD: .aq; .au

The Australian Antarctic Territory (AAT) is a region of East Antarctica claimed by Australia as an external territory. It is the largest sector of Antarctica by area claimed by any country; and the claim was transferred to Australia from the United Kingdom in 1933. Australia is an original signatory of the 1959 Antarctic Treaty, under which all territorial claims are held in abeyance. Only four other countries accept Australia's claim to sovereignty: New Zealand, the United Kingdom, France, and Norway.

The Australian Antarctic Territory is administered by the Australian Antarctic Division, an agency of the federal Department of Climate Change, Energy, the Environment and Water. Australia has three permanent research stations in the territory: Mawson Station, Davis Station, and Casey Station. The territory has no permanent population apart from the staff employed through the Australian Antarctic Program, which typically consists of around 500 people in summer and as few as 80 people in winter.

== History ==
Australia served as a stopping point for voyages towards the Antarctic region during the early 19th century, and many Australian sealers and whalers ventured towards the sub-Antarctic islands in search of animals to hunt. Australians began participating in expeditions to the Antarctic continent during the Heroic Age of Antarctic Exploration. The Southern Cross Expedition of 1898 included the Tasmanian scientist Louis Bernacchi, who also joined the Discovery Expedition of 1901. The Australian government contributed funds to the Australasian Antarctic Expedition of 1911, led by the Australian geologist Douglas Mawson.

The status of the British Empire's claims over Antarctica was discussed at the 1926 Imperial Conference, which recommended that Britain take action to strengthen its sovereignty over its territorial claims. The following year, Mawson publicly criticised the Australian government for its failure to assert control over the portions of the Antarctic closest to Australia. In February 1929, Australian Prime Minister Stanley Bruce announced in parliament that he considered the Australian sphere of influence in Antarctica to extend from the Ross Sea to Enderby Land. Mawson returned to Antarctica as leader of the British Australian and New Zealand Antarctic Research Expedition (BANZARE) and proclaimed British sovereignty over the land between the 47th and 73rd meridians east on 13 January 1930. A further proclamation was made on 18 February 1931 over the area between the 60th and 138th meridians east.

In 1933, the British government issued an order-in-council placing Britain's Antarctic territory—described as consisting of the lands between the 45th and 160th meridians east, excluding France's Adélie Land—under Australia's control. Later that year, Australia passed the Australian Antarctic Territory Acceptance Act 1933 to take possession of the territory. The order-in-council came into effect on 24 August 1936. The establishment of the territory was protested by Norway, which protested that the territory included land originally discovered by Norwegian explorers, but this dispute was resolved in 1939 after the nations reached a compromise regarding licensing requirements for Norwegian whalers. Australia established its first permanent base on Antarctica, Mawson Station, in 1954. This was followed by Davis Station in 1957, and two years later Australia took over the United States-built Wilkes Station. Wilkes Station was replaced by a site named Repstat in 1969, which was subsequently replaced by Casey Station in 1988.

Australia passed the Australian Antarctic Territory Act in 1954, which placed the territory under the laws of the Australian Capital Territory and gave the federal government the power to make ordinances for its administration. The International Geophysical Year of 1957–1958 saw a substantial increase in international scientific collaboration and the establishment of many research stations by other nations in Australia's territorial claim. Australia was among the signatories of the Antarctic Treaty in 1959, which came into effect on 23 June 1961. In 1991 Australia signed the Protocol on Environmental Protection to the Antarctic Treaty, also known as the Madrid Protocol, which entered into force in 1998. Among other measures, the protocol banned mining on the continent and designated Antarctica as a nature reserve.

== Geography and climate ==
Map of districts of Australian Antarctic Territory Enderby Land Kemp Land Mac. Robertson Land Princess Elizabeth Land Kaiser Wilhelm II Land Queen Mary Land Wilkes Land George V Land Oates Land

The Australian Antarctic Territory occupies the area south of the 60th parallel south between the 160th meridian east and 45th meridian east, excluding France's Adélie Land, which occupies the area between the 136th and 142nd meridian east. It has a total area of about 5,900,000 km^{2} (2,300,000 sq mi), or 42% of Antarctica's land area. The two tallest mountains in the Australian Antarctic Territory are Mount McClintock with a height of 3,490 m (11,450 ft) and Mount Menzies with a height of 3,355 m (11,007 ft).

The territory has a cold and windy climate, with temperatures that range between −40 °C (−40 °F) and 10 °C (50 °F) near the coast and between −80 °C (−112 °F) and −30 °C (−22 °F) in the areas furthest inland. Wind speeds in the Australian Antarctic Territory can reach up to 320 kilometres per hour.

=== Subdivisions ===
Subdivisions of the Australian Antarctic Territory
Name	Western border	Eastern border	Ref
Enderby Land	045° E	055° E	
Kemp Land	055° E	060° E	
Mac.Robertson Land	060° E	073° E	
Princess Elizabeth Land	073° E	087°55'20" E	
Kaiser Wilhelm II Land	087°55'20" E	091°58'33" E	
Queen Mary Land	091°58'33" E	100°31'32.5" E	
Wilkes Land	100°31'32.5" E	136° E	
George V Land	142° E	155° E	
Oates Land	155° E	164° E	

== Administration ==
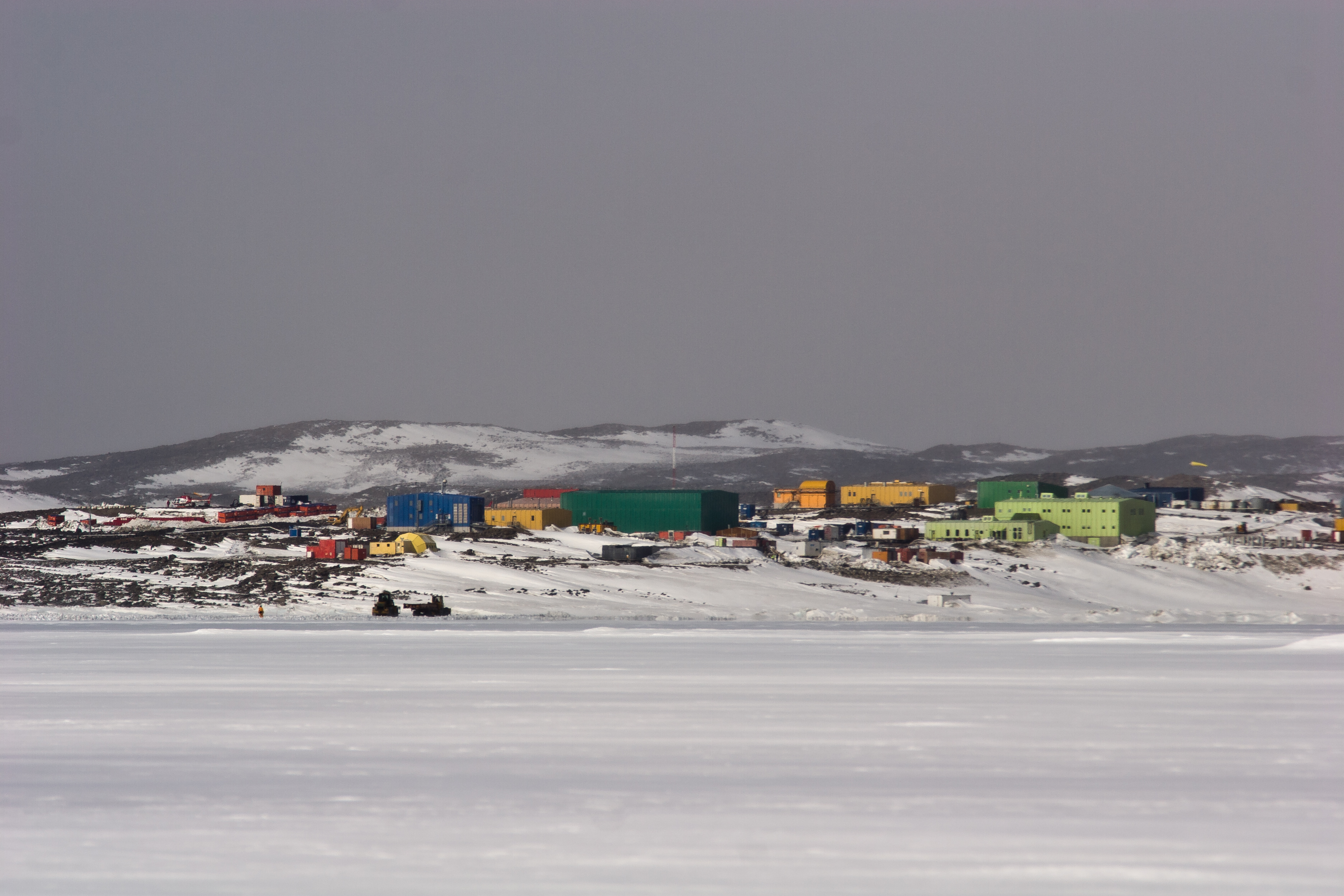
Davis Station

The territory is administered by the Australian Antarctic Division within the Department of Climate Change, Energy, the Environment and Water. Australia has three permanent research stations in the territory: Mawson Station, Davis Station and Casey Station. Australia established a permanent runway in the territory, the Wilkins Aerodrome, in 2007. The aerodrome is located south-east of Casey Station and is operational between October and March. There are also several outposts and summer bases in the Australian Antarctic Territory that are staffed on a seasonal basis for environmental monitoring or for specific research purposes. The number of Australians in the territory as part of the Australian Antarctic Program is about 500 in summer and 80 in winter.

The Australian Antarctic Territory is governed by four sets of law, in order of priority: Commonwealth laws that explicitly include the territory within their scope; Commonwealth ordinances made for the territory; non-criminal laws of the Australian Capital Territory; and criminal laws of the Jervis Bay Territory. Commonwealth ordinances made for the Australian Antarctic Territory have largely been focused on environmental protection and the enactment of international conventions, such as the Protocol on Environmental Protection to the Antarctic Treaty. Under the Antarctic Treaty Act 1960, the laws of the Australian Antarctic Territory do not apply to foreign observers carrying out inspections in the territory under the terms of the Antarctic Treaty, but do apply to Australian observers carrying out such inspections elsewhere in Antarctica. Australia does not enforce the territory's laws against the citizens of other Antarctic Treaty signatories unless those citizens have voluntarily agreed to be subject to Australian law.

The Australian Antarctic Territory has seen an increasing number of tourists, which has led Australia to take steps to manage tourism in the territory. About 120,000 tourists participated in Antarctic cruises in 2023–2024, 65% of whom were participating in tours that allowed landings on Antarctic territory. These landings take place in a small number of locations, mostly concentrated on the Antarctic Peninsula on the opposite site of the continent from the Australian Antarctic Territory. The Australian government requires tourism in the territory to meet two requirements: being ecologically sustainable and socially responsible. The government has placed limits and conditions on tourist landings and has established site management plans for frequently visited sites.

=== Sovereignty ===
The 1961 Antarctic Treaty froze current and future claims of sovereignty in Antarctica, leaving the status quo at the time of its signing in place. It also dictated that actions taken following the treaty's signing could not be used as the basis for future claims of sovereignty. Australia's claim of sovereignty over the Australian Antarctic Territory is accepted by just four nations: Norway, New Zealand, France, and the United Kingdom. Australia has positioned itself as a supporter of the Antarctic Treaty System. The 2016 Australian Antarctic Strategy and 20 Year Action Plan describes Australia's national interests in Antarctica as including both the preservation of sovereignty over the Australian Antarctic Territory, and the maintenance of the Antarctic Treaty System and the continent's freedom from strategic competition.

Australia has attempted to combat illegal, unreported and unregulated fishing, particularly whaling, in the seas surrounding its Antarctic territorial claim. Japanese whaling in Australia's claimed exclusive economic zone has been a particularly contentious issue. These whaling activities are prohibited under Australian law but are supported by the government of Japan, which disputes the claim that Australian law applies to the seas in question. The Japanese government argued that its whaling was carried out for research purposes, and was therefore permitted under the International Convention for the Regulation of Whaling. The Australian Government filed legal action against Japan in 2010 at the International Court of Justice and the public hearing commenced in 2013. The Court ruled in 2014 that Japan's whaling activities in the Southern Ocean were not carried out for scientific purposes and that it must cease its whaling program in Antarctic waters. Japan withdrew from whaling in the Southern Ocean following the ruling, and instead began to focus on commercial whaling within the Japanese exclusive economic zone.

== See also ==
- Postage stamps and postal history of the Australian Antarctic Territory
- Research stations in Antarctica
