= Compendium of postage stamp issuers (Ar–Az) =

Each "article" in this category is a collection of entries about several stamp issuers, presented in alphabetical order. The entries are formulated on the micro model and so provide summary information about all known issuers.

See the Category:Compendium of postage stamp issuers page for details of the project.

== Arad (French Occupation) ==
Hungarian stamps overprinted Occupation Française.

Dates
1919 only
Currency
100 filler = 1 korona
Refer
French Occupation Issues

== Arbe ==
Stamps of Fiume overprinted Arbe during the last month (Nov-Dec 1920) of the Carnaro regency in Fiume. Arbe became the Yugoslav island of Rab. Fiume has been renamed Rijeka.

Dates
1920 only
Currency
100 centesimi = 1 lira
Refer
Fiume

== Archipel des Comores ==
Refer
Comoro Islands

== Argentina ==
Dates
1858 –
Capital
Buenos Aires
Currency
100 centavos = 1 peso
Main Article
Postage stamps and postal history of Argentina

== Argentine Territories ==
Main Article
Includes
Buenos Aires;
Córdoba;
Corrientes
Tierra del Fuego

== Armenia ==
Following the dissolution of the USSR in 1991, Armenia became an independent republic and started to issue its own stamps in 1992.

Dates
1992 –
Capital
Yerevan
Currency
(1992) 100 kopecks = 1 Russian rouble
(2002) 100 luma = 1 dram
Main Article
Postage stamps and postal history of Armenia
Includes
Armenia (pre-Soviet)
See also
Transcaucasian Federation;
Union of Soviet Socialist Republics (USSR)

== Armenia (pre-Soviet) ==
Formerly part of Transcaucasian Russia, Armenia gained temporary independence after the 1917 Russian Revolution. During 1922–1924, Armenia formed part of the Transcaucasian Federation with Azerbaijan and Georgia. Used stamps of the USSR 1924–1991.

Dates
1919 – 1923
Capital
Yerevan
Currency
100 kopecks = 1 Armenian rouble
Refer
Armenia

== Army Post ==
Refer
Egypt (British Forces)

== Artsakh ==
Refer
Nagorno-Karabakh

== Aruba ==
Aruba is a small, rocky and semiarid island in the Caribbean, about 165 miles north of Venezuela. It is one of the Leewards and is near the Dutch islands of Curaçao and Bonaire. Oil refining was its major industry until 1985 when the refinery was closed down. Attempts are now being made to promote tourism. The population is cosmopolitan with Dutch the official language. The island was occupied by Spain early in the 16th century. The Spaniards were driven out by the Dutch in 1634. Apart from a brief period of British rule during the Napoleonic Wars, it has remained a Dutch territory ever since, forming part of the Netherlands Antilles until 1986. The economic situation in the 1970s led to demands for separation. This was achieved on 1 January 1986 when Aruba was granted the status of internal autonomy within the Kingdom of the Netherlands. The first stamps were issued on the same date. Aruba was scheduled for full independence in 1996.

Dates
1986 –
Capital
Oranjestad
Currency
100 cents = 1 gulden
Main Article
Postage stamps and postal history of Aruba
See also
Netherlands Antilles

== Arwad ==
Refer
Ile Rouad

== Ascension ==
Used GB stamps 1867–1922.

Dates
1922 –
Capital
Georgetown
Currency
(1922) 12 pence = 1 shilling; 20 shillings = 1 pound
(1971) 100 pence = 1 pound

== Asch (Sudetenland) ==
There was an issue in Asch (now Aš) by Germans in September 1938, not unauthorized by Czechoslovak authorities which would soon lose control after the Munich Agreement.

Refer
Czechoslovakia

== Astypalaea ==
Island in the Dodecanese which belonged to Italy 1912–1945 and used general issues of Aegean Islands (Egeo) throughout that period. Also issued own stamps inscribed STAMPALIA, which is the Italian name of the island.

Dates
1912 – 1932
Currency
100 centesimi = 1 lira (Italian)
Refer
Aegean Islands (Dodecanese)

== Ataman Semyonov Regime (Transbaikal) ==
This was based at Chita until it was overthrown by forces of the Far Eastern Republic.

Dates
1920 only
Capital
Chita
Currency
100 kopecks = 1 Russian rouble
Refer
Russian Civil War Issues

== Aunus (Finnish Occupation) ==
The Russian town of Olonetz was occupied by Finland during the Russian Civil War. Finnish stamps were issued with an overprint of AUNUS.

Dates
1919 only
Currency
100 penni = 1 markka
Refer
Finnish Occupation Issues

== Australia ==
Before 1913, the individual states had their own issues.

Dates
1913 –
Capital
Canberra
Currency
(1913) 12 pence = 1 shilling; 20 shillings = 1 pound
(1966) 100 cents = 1 dollar
See also
New South Wales;
Queensland;
South Australia;
Tasmania;
Victoria;
Western Australia

== Australian Antarctic Territory ==
Dates
1957 –
Currency
(1957) 12 pence = 1 shilling; 20 shillings = 1 pound
(1966) 100 cents = 1 dollar

== Austria ==
Dates
1850 –
Capital
Vienna
Currency
(1850) 60 kreutzer = 1 florin
(1858) 100 kreutzer = 1 florin
(1899) 100 heller = 1 crown
(1925) 100 groschen = 1 schilling
(1938) 100 pfennige = 1 reichsmark (German)
(1945) 100 groschen = 1 schilling
(2002) 100 cent = 1 euro
See also
Lombardy & Venetia

== Austria-Hungary ==
The Austrian Empire was formed in 1804 to anticipate the dissolution in 1806 of the ancient and maligned Holy Roman Empire by Napoleon. Austria, home of the Habsburg dynasty, had been the central part of the Holy Roman Empire. In the aftermath of Waterloo, Austria was one of the strongest nations in Europe and its foreign minister Metternich became the architect of the Concert of Europe which was able to maintain peace in a divided continent for several decades. Hungary, the land of the Magyars that lies to the east of Austria, was part of the Austrian Empire at that time but it constantly sought control of its own affairs. Austria faced a crisis after its defeat by Prussia in the Seven Weeks War of 1866. To consolidate his power, the Emperor Franz Josef negotiated in March 1867 the Ausgleich (Compromise) with the Magyar ruling classes. As a result, Hungary gained control of its internal affairs and the two states of Austria and Hungary were federated into what became commonly known as the Dual Monarchy. The words Kaiserliche und Königliche on Austrian stamps refer to the Empire of Austria and the Kingdom of Hungary, both titles being held by Franz Josef. The Dual Monarchy endured until the end of WWI. Austria and Hungary had separate postal administration from the time of the Ausgleich although it was not until May 1871 that Hungary could issue its first stamps. In the meantime, a set of "neutral" stamps were issued that showed a profile of Franz Josef and a value. The fact of the Dual Monarchy was emphasised in stamps issued abroad by Austro-Hungarian post offices or military forces. Hence, reference should be made to Austria and Hungary separately re home issues and to the various Austro-Hungarian entries for overseas issues.

Refer
Austria;
Austro-Hungarian Military Post;
Austro-Hungarian Occupation of Bosnia & Herzegovina;
Austro-Hungarian Post Offices in the Turkish Empire;
Hungary

== Austrian Italy ==
Refer
Lombardy & Venetia

== Austrian Levant ==
Refer
Austro-Hungarian Post Offices in the Turkish Empire

== Austrian Territories acquired by Italy ==
Refer
Italian Austria

== Austro-Hungarian Military Post ==
Stamps inscribed K-u-K FELDPOST were issued in Serbia (1916), Montenegro (1917), Romania (1917–1918) and Italy (1918).

Dates
1915 – 1918
Currency
100 heller = 1 krone (General Issues, Serbia, Montenegro);
100 centesimi = 1 lira (Italy);
100 bani = 1 leu (Rumania)
Main Article
Includes
Italy (Austrian Occupation);
Montenegro (Austrian Occupation);
Rumania (Austrian Occupation);
Serbia (Austrian Occupation)

== Austro-Hungarian Occupation of Bosnia & Herzegovina ==
Refer
Bosnia & Herzegovina

== Austro-Hungarian Post Offices in the Turkish Empire ==
Austria had various issues, some with overprinted values, for use in its offices throughout the Turkish Empire, including those in territory that now belongs to Greece. The offices in what is now Greek territory were at Prevesa (Epirus); Jannina (Epirus); Port Lagos (Thrace); Dedeagatz (Thrace); Volos (Thessaly); Kavalla (Macedonia); Vathy (Samos); Mytilene; Corfu; Salonika; Leros (Dodecanese); Rhodes. There were special issues for the Austrian offices in Crete.

Dates
1867 – 1915
Currency
(1867) 100 soldi = 1 florin
(1886) 40 paras = 1 piastre
See also
Crete (Austro-Hungarian Post Offices)

== AVIANCA ==
Private air company.

Dates
1950 – 1951
Currency
100 centavos = 1 peso
Refer
Colombian Territories

== Azarbaycan ==
Refer
Azerbaijan

== Azerbaijan ==
Following the dissolution of the USSR in 1991, Azerbaijan became an independent state and has issued its own stamps, inscribed AZARBAYCAN, since 1992.

Dates
1992 –
Capital
Baku
Currency
100 qopik = 1 manat
Main Article
Postage stamps and postal history of Azerbaijan
Includes
Azerbaijan (pre-Soviet);
Nakhichevan
See also
Transcaucasian Federation;
Union of Soviet Socialist Republics (USSR)

== Azerbaijan (pre-Soviet) ==
Formerly part of the Russian Empire, it became temporarily independent in May 1918 but was invaded by the Soviet Union in April 1920. Subsequently, joined the Transcaucasian Federation prior to incorporation within the USSR, whose stamps it used from 1924 to 1991.

Dates
1919 – 1921
Capital
Baku
Currency
100 kopecks = 1 Azerbaijani rouble
Refer
Azerbaijan
See also
Transcaucasian Federation;
Union of Soviet Socialist Republics (USSR)

== Azores (Acores) ==
Dates
1980 –
Capital
Ponta Delgada
Currency
100 centavos = 1 escudo
Includes
Azores (Portuguese Colonial Issues)
See also
Africa (Portuguese Colonies);
Azores Territories;
Portugal

== Azores (Portuguese Colonial Issues) ==
Dates
1868 – 1931
Capital
Ponta Delgada
Currency
(1868) 1000 reis = 1 milreis
(1912) 100 centavos = 1 escudo
Refer
Azores

== Azores Territories ==
Main Article
Includes
Angra;
Horta;
Ponta Delgada
See also
Azores

== Bibliography ==
- Stanley Gibbons Ltd, various catalogues
- Stanley Gibbons Ltd, Europe and Colonies 1970, Stanley Gibbons Ltd, 1969
- Stuart Rossiter & John Flower, The Stamp Atlas, W H Smith, 1989
- XLCR Stamp Finder and Collector's Dictionary, Thomas Cliffe Ltd, c.1960
