= Postage stamps and postal history of Lebanon =

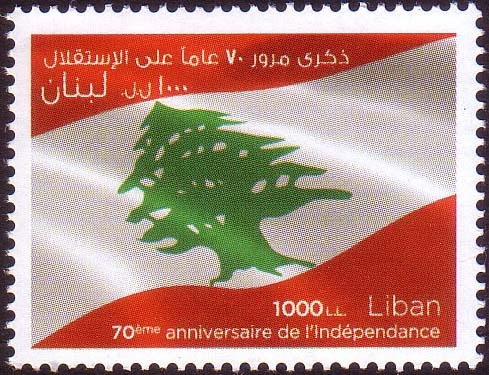
A 2013 stamp of Lebanon

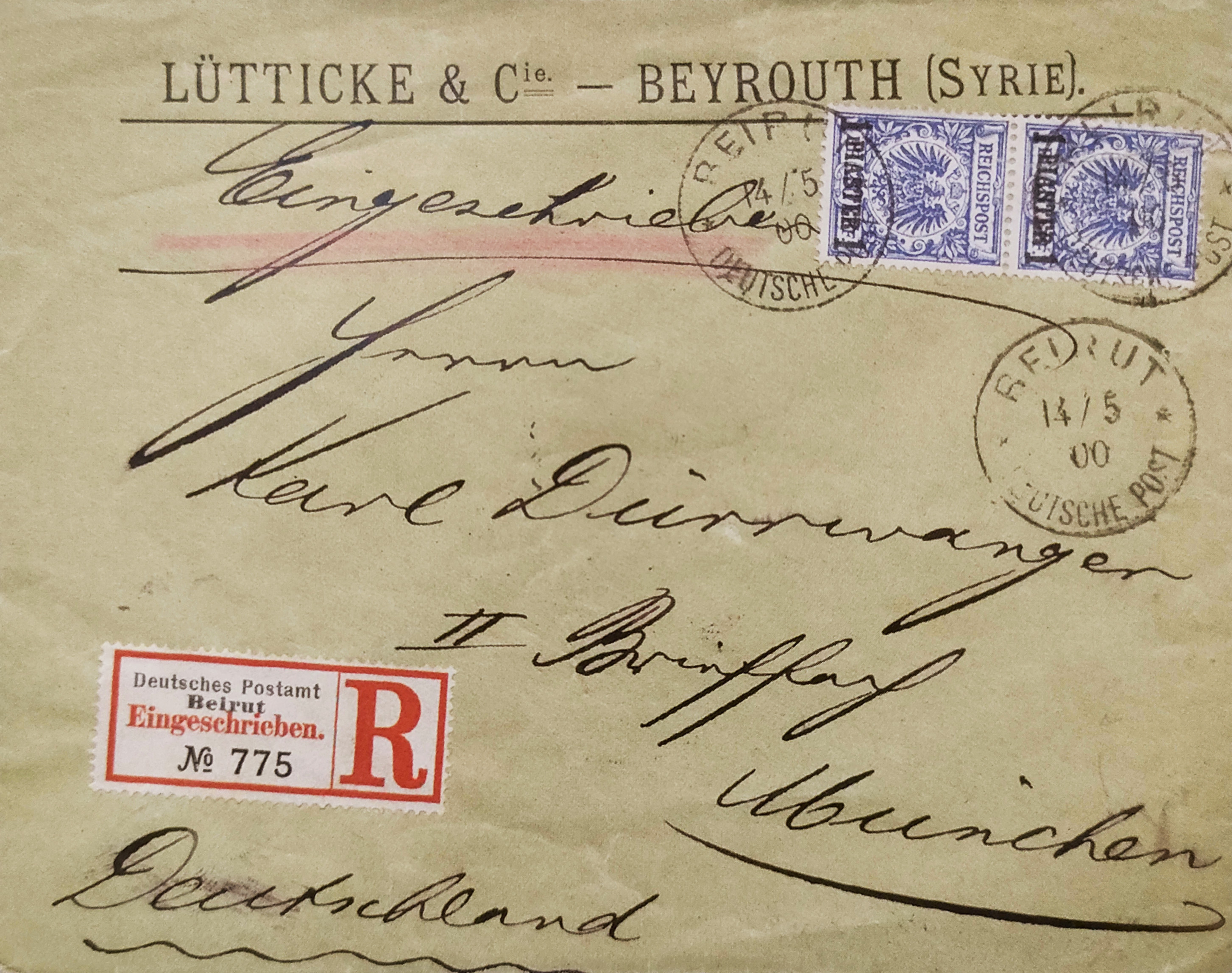
A German postal cover sent from the German postal office in Beirut on 14 May 1900

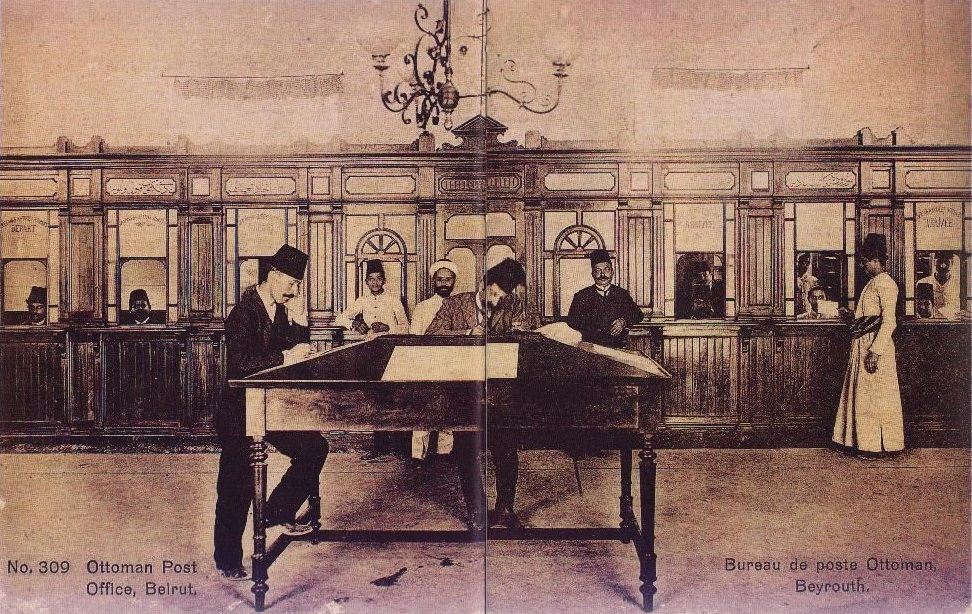
Beirut Ottoman Post Office 1900s

This is a survey of the postage stamps and postal history of Lebanon, formerly known as Liban.

Lebanon is a country in Western Asia on the eastern shore of the Mediterranean Sea. Syria borders it to the north and east, and Israel to the south.

== Early postal arrangements ==
Following the commercial revolution, Lebanon played an essential role during the eleventh century, linking trade routes between the Far East, Africa, the Arabian Peninsula, and Europe. In order to extend their interests to the east, European commerce had to support the development of communication in the Levant. The Ottoman administration implemented a terrestrial postal network in 1834, while the Europeans were working on a maritime postal network.

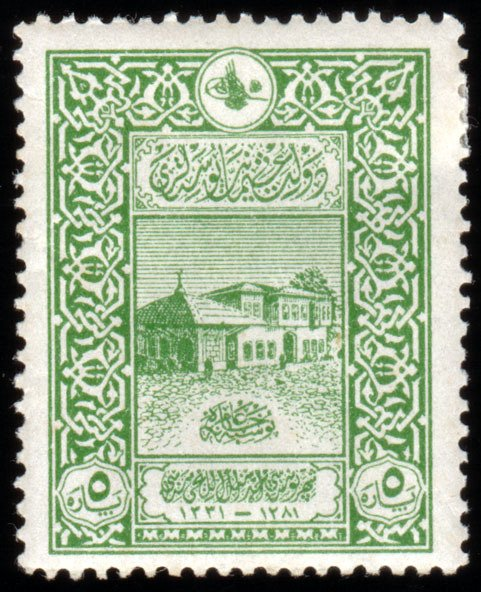
Ottoman postage stamp issued in March 1916 printed in Vienna

=== The opening of post offices in Lebanon ===
"Lloyd Austriaco," a shipping company based in Italy, and "Les paquebots de l'administration des postes", a French company based in Marseilles, were the first European companies to install their postal infrastructures in the eastern Mediterranean. The Ottoman administration started the restructuration of their postal service in 1840, adopting a regime of an exclusive monopoly of postal transport to and from the interior localities while observing a policy of cohabitation with the European postal offices on the coasts of the empire. Concerning the current Lebanese territory, the first Ottoman post office opened to the public in Beirut in 1841.

=== Postage stamps before 1914 ===
We can confirm that the first stamps appeared in Lebanon through letters from Europe. The first French, Turkish, Ostrich, Russian, Egyptian, British, and German postal stamps used in Lebanon dated back to 1857, 1863, 1864, 1865, 1870, 1873, and 1900 respectively. The Turkish postal system had around 200 post offices in the region.

In February 1872, Egypt closed its postal offices in Lebanon. And from 1885, the remaining foreign postal administrations (with the exception of the German administration who followed them in 1900) overprinted the stamps in Turkish piastres. After the great spread of foreign postal offices and levant postal stamps, World War I emerged and led the Ottoman administration to shut down all foreign postal offices. This was the end of the emission of postage stamps special to the Levant.

=== The use of postage stamps between 1914 and 1918 ===
During this period, Lebanon was exclusively using Ottoman stamps. The Ottoman administration had more than 200 post offices spread throughout the territory. Therefore, the postal service was efficient, despite its only limitation being that the service was exclusively terrestrial.

Due to the advent of the war, the issue of new Ottoman stamps was complicated, if not impossible, so the decision of using obsolete postage stamps was taken, overprinting the year of the reissuing in a half moon under a star. This was the only way found t make postage stamps always available in the Ottoman territory before the issue of new ordinary stamps in March 1916 in Vienna.

Nevertheless, overprinted stamps continued to be used in all the Ottoman territories including Lebanon, until the end of September 1918, the beginning of the Ottoman withdrawal from Lebanon.

Even after raising of the French flag on what nowadays known as the Lebanese territory, the operational infrastructure still depended on the British army, one of which was the postal service. So the use of British stamps was adopted (starting in October 1918) after the adoption of the old pre-payment postal system. Indeed, from November of this year, the stamps overprinted E.E.F (Egyptian Expeditionary Forces) were available for use by the British occupying forces in the former Turkish territories. From that moment, for approximately one year, the E.E.F stamps were used in all French occupied territories, including Lebanon, until 1920, after the issue of French stamps in November 1919.

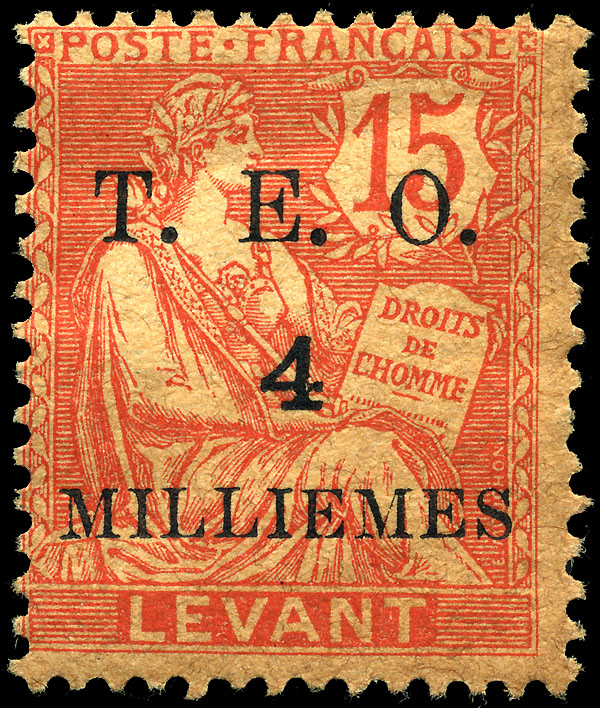
A French colonies key type stamp of Levant overprinted T.E.O. for use during the French military occupation of Syria and Lebanon between

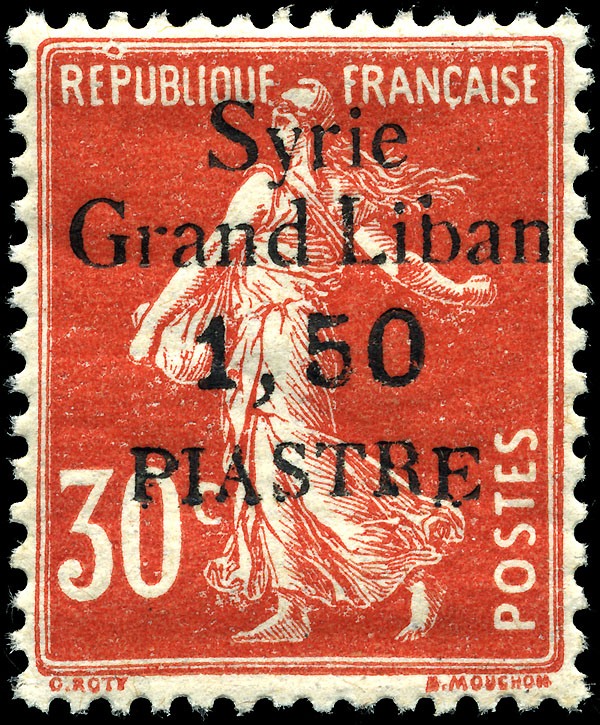
A "sower" stamp of France overprinted for use in Lebanon and Syria in 1923 during the period of the French Mandate

== French military occupation ==
Following the mandate given to France in 1920 and the defeat of Syrian forces in May 1920 at the Battle of Maysalun, Syria was divided into two countries, Syria and Lebanon; both were under French military occupation. Stamps of France for use in Syria overprinted T.E.O. (Territoires Ennemis Occupés) were used in Lebanon in 1919, followed by stamps overprinted O.M.F. (Occupation Militaire Francaise) between 1920 and 1922.

== French Mandate ==
As a League of Nations mandate, Lebanon used the stamps of France, overprinted "Syrie Grand Liban" (standing for Syria and Greater Lebanon) in 1923.

The postal administrations for Syria and Lebanon were separated in 1924, and the stamps of France overprinted "Grand Liban" were issued for Lebanon.

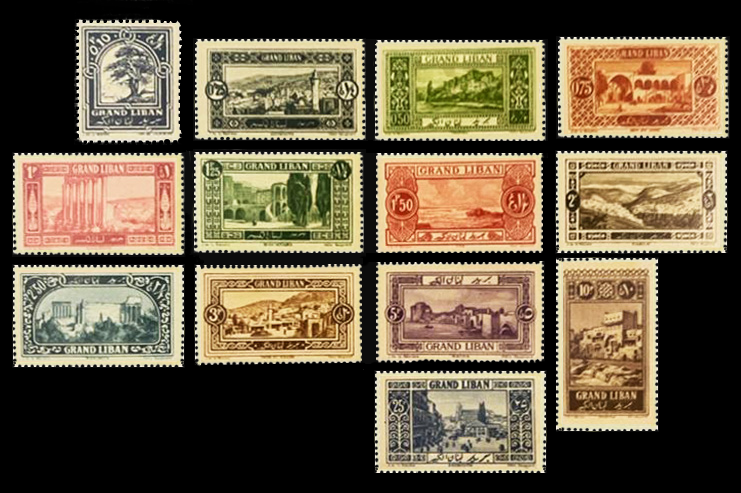
1925 Lebanese stamp series, first definitive

=== The first definitive Lebanese stamps ===
On February 21, 1925, the order No. 50/S provided that "from march the first 1925, the correspondent postage originating from Syria and Greater Lebanon will be carried out as definitive stamps specific to each of the above-mentioned postal offices, the series of which includes in Syrian-Lebanese piastres the values of 0.10 - 0.25 - 0.50 - 0.75 - 1 - 1.25 - 1.50 - 2 - 2.50 - 3 - 5 - 10 and 25 piastres. Tax stamps: 0.50 - 1 - 2 - 3 and 5 piastres".

So as mentioned, Lebanon issued its first definitive stamps in 1925, representing the Lebanese cedar (symbol of Lebanon) and Lebanese cities and monuments, including Beirut, Tripoli, Beit ed-Din, Baalbek, Moukhtara, Tyre, Zahle, Deir el Qamar and Saida.

== Lebanese Republic ==
The Great Druze Revolt and the following crisis pushed France to authorize the elaboration of the Lebanese republic on 23 May 1926. Authorized by the order 1244 the 24 May 1927, a new stamp series appeared overprinting the first definitive stamp series "République Libanaise" standing for the Lebanese republic (replacing "Grand Liban") only in French, until 1928 where the overprint "الجمهورية اللبنانية" (standing for the Lebanese Republic) was featured on the same mentioned stamps.

In 1930, the first definitive Lebanese republic stamp series was issued.

== Independence ==
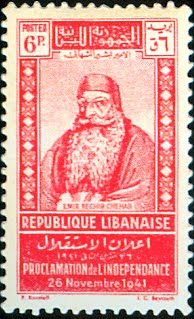
A stamp issued in 1942 commemorating the proclamation of independence

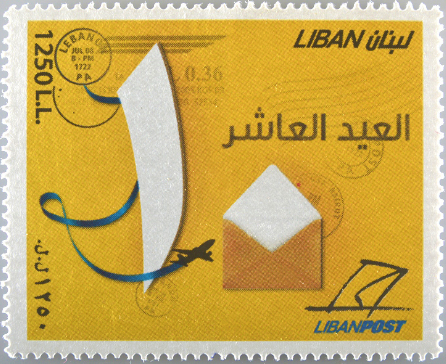
LibanPost 10th anniversary stamp

Lebanon proclaimed independence in November 1941. The French government accepted the independence of Lebanon on November 22, 1943. A stamp series of 15 stamps featuring the independence men was issued in 2016.

From the 1940s, the term Liban started to be used, which is Lebanon's name in French. Today all stamps of Lebanon are marked simply "Liban." In 1946, the actual Lebanese flag was featured on stamps for the first time, and the first definitive stamps were issued marked "Liban" instead of "Grand Liban."

In 1988, Lebanese stamps were now priced in Lebanese pound, marked L.L. (standing for Livre Libanaise) and .ل.ل (standing for ليرة لبنانية).

In 1998, LibanPost was established, replacing a foreign company taking over the Lebanese postal service. Today, Lebanese postage stamps are designed and issued by LibanPost.

== See also ==
- Postage stamps and postal history of Alawite State
- Postage stamps and postal history of Syria
