= Arutanga =

Town in Aitutaki, Cook Islands

Coordinates: 18°52′S 159°48′W

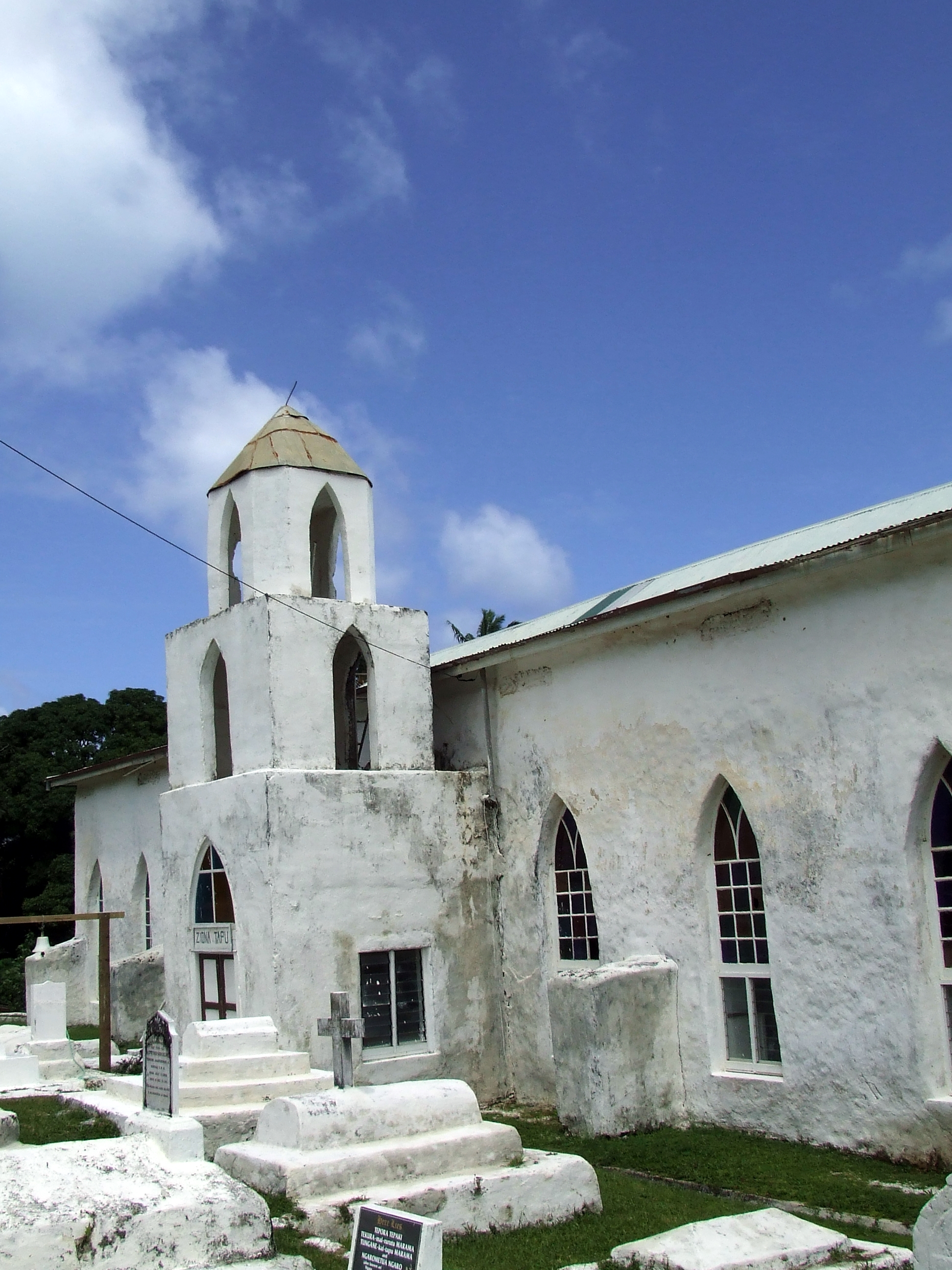
Aitutaki Church, Cook Islands

Arutanga is the main town of the island of Aitutaki in the Cook Islands.

The main wharf is located here, and there is access into the lagoon. The largest supermarket is also located in Arutanga. Its Cook Islands Christian Church was built in 1828 by the London Missionary Society and is the oldest in the country.

To the right-hand side of the wharf is a game fishing area where the public can compete in fishing contests.
