= LibanPost =

LibanPost ليبان بوست
- Company type: Private
- Industry: Postal services
- Founded: 1998
- Headquarters: Lebanon
- Key people: Antoni Lorfing (CEO)
- Website: http://www.libanpost.com.lb

LibanPost is the national post office of Lebanon, established in 1998. It is privately owned, in charge of operating the postal sector. Since its inception, LibanPost embarked on a program of rebuilding infrastructure, diversification and branding.

== Services ==
The company offers more than 1,000 services, covering mail and express, financial services, retail and merchandising activities, business, e-commerce and governmental services. LibanPost provides governmental services portfolio across 15 public institutions, positioning itself as a formal intermediary between citizens and governmental institutions.

LibanPost is a member of the Express Mail Service.

== Size of operations ==
The company handles an average of 20 million shipments yearly. Up to the year 2011, LibanPost had executed 8 million governmental formalities. LibanPost operates today a network of 74 post offices.

== Automation ==
LibanPost has developed applications for 150 services and 350 sub-services, including a governmental services platform. LibanPost developed services such as the Home Service facility, providing post office services at the customer's premises, and address coding using GPS technology.

== See also ==
- Postage stamps and postal history of Lebanon
