= Postage stamps and postal history of Honduras =

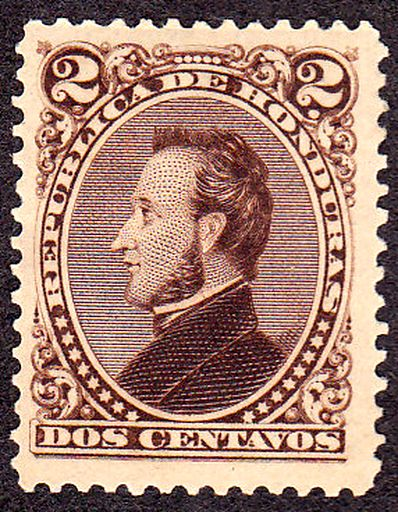
Example of an Honduras stamp, dating from 1878

Honduras became independent from Spain in 1838. It began producing its own stamps in 1866.
