= Compendium of postage stamp issuers (Q) =

Each "article" in this category is in fact a collection of entries about several stamp issuers, presented in alphabetical order. The entries themselves are formulated on the micro model and so provide summary information about all known issuers.

See the Category:Compendium of postage stamp issuers page for details of the project.

== Qatar ==
Qatar had special treaty relations with Great Britain from 1916 until 3 September 1971, when it became an independent state. British Agency general issues were used at Doha from August 1950 and at Umm Said from February 1956. On 1 April 1957, the agencies issued GB stamps overprinted QATAR. The agencies closed on 23 May 1963 when Qatar began its own service.

Dates
1957 –
Capital
Doha
Currency
(1957) 100 naye paise = 1 rupee
(1966) 100 dirhams = 1 riyal

Main Article Needed

See also
British Postal Agencies in Eastern Arabia

== Qishn & Socotra ==
Refer
Mahra Sultanate of Qishn & Socotra

== Qu'Aiti State in Hadhramaut ==
Dates
1955 – 1967
Capital
Mukalla
Currency
(1955) 100 cents = 1 shilling
(1966) 1000 fils = 1 dinar

Refer
Aden Protectorate States

== Qu'Aiti State of Shihr & Mukalla ==
Dates
1942 – 1955
Capital
Mukalla
Currency
(1942) 16 annas = 1 rupee
(1951) 100 cents = 1 shilling

Refer
Aden Protectorate States

== Queen Maud Land ==
Refer
Norwegian Dependency

== Queensland ==
Dates
1860 – 1913
Capital
Brisbane
Currency
12 pence = 1 shilling; 20 shillings = 1 pound

Main Article Needed

See also
Australia

== Quelimane ==
Dates
1913 – 1920
Capital
Quelimane
Currency
100 centavos = 1 escudo

Refer
Mozambique Territories

== Bibliography ==
- Stanley Gibbons Ltd, Europe and Colonies 1970, Stanley Gibbons Ltd, 1969
- Stanley Gibbons Ltd, various catalogues
- Stuart Rossiter & John Flower, The Stamp Atlas, W H Smith, 1989
- XLCR Stamp Finder and Collector's Dictionary, Thomas Cliffe Ltd, c.1960
