= Postage stamps and postal history of the Australian Antarctic Territory =

The Australian Antarctic Territory, claimed by Australia on 1 December 1959, has used a postal system as its main point of contact since its establishment, due to its isolation. The territory covers over 5.8 million kilometres squared and currently has five stations, after Wilkes Station closed down in 1969. Each of the bases has its own post office that are run by Australia Post, who also controls stamp issues according to recent or important events within the territory. The history of the postage system dates back to the original post office within the territory, which first opened in 1955, which was in conjunction with a stamp release. The current system now combines new technologies with aged systems to create more efficiency, with recent stamp releases commending the history of the Australian Antarctic Territory and the Arts.

== History ==
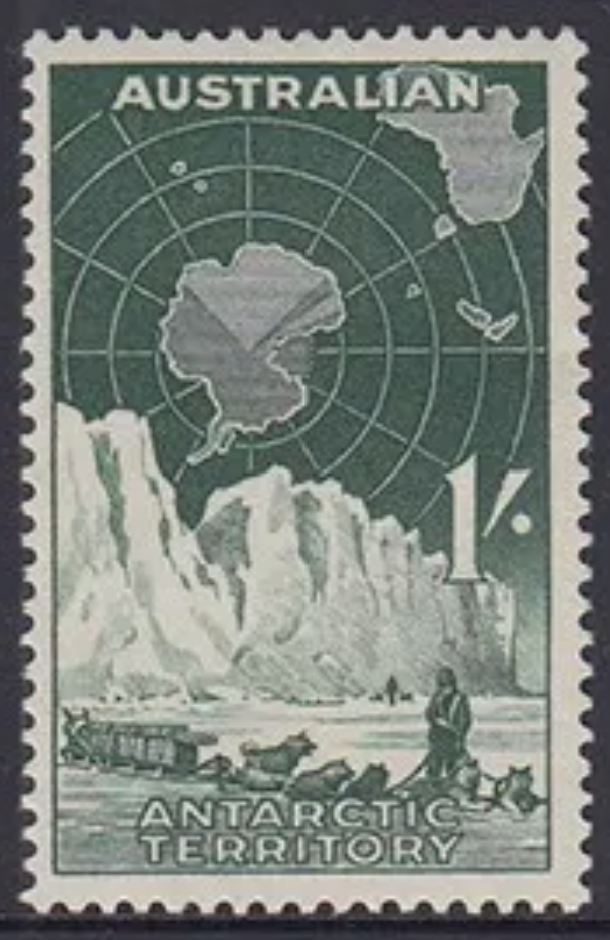
'DOG SLED AND TEAM', a part of the fourth stamp release for the Australian Antarctic Territory in October 1961 and worth 1 shilling at the time

Australia has issued postage stamps for the Australian Antarctic Territory since 1957. All have been Antarctic themed, and are also valid for postage in Australia, so in practice, they are just Australian stamps with a different inscription. The Australian Antarctic Territory Act (1954) allowed for a postage system to be introduced in 1955, under the commonwealth and after the territory had commenced philatelic colonialism. The introduction of the system produced both a postmark and postcard, which could be used both on mainland Australia (for postage all over the country, not specifically to the Antarctic Territory) or from the Territory itself.

=== Post ===
==== Past postage systems ====
Before the Australian Antarctic Territory Act was signed in 1954, all expeditions to Antarctica were customised with different rubber postage stamps. For the Australian Antarctic Expedition, 1911–1914, commandeered and under the leadership of Sir Douglas Mawson a stamp was commissioned in order to show that letters were being sent from the ship used to travel to Antarctica. The stamps were round, with an emperor penguin and the inscription "LOOSE SHIP'S LETTER/POSTED IN ANTARCTICA/S.Y. AURORA". All letters leaving from the S.Y. Aurora were stamped with an Australian stamp, which was then covered with the official expedition stamp in order to show the location from which they were sent from.

This system was adjusted in 1955 when the first post office was established in MacRobertson Land (Mawson Station), where letters were stamped with adhesive stamps and sent via plane or ship to mainland Australia, where they were sorted and distributed across the country.

However, when expeditions were organised, such as the South Indian Ocean Expedition to Heard Island (1964–65) and the Australian National Antarctic Research Expeditions (1947–65), rubber stamps were also commissioned, often featuring penguins, in order to clearly identify where letters were arriving from in the sorting office in mainland Australia.

==== Australian Antarctic Territory postage stamps ====
In the past, until approximately 1970, stamps were issued in both Australia and the Australian Antarctic Territory, and were available in Australian post offices for two weeks before being "procurable at the [Australia Post] Department's philatelic sections in all States", in order to increase interest around the Antarctic discoveries for Australia. However, after this period, stamps for the Territory were issued in both Australia and the Australian Antarctic Territory, yet limited in Australia to a small amount of stock which could be bought at Australia Post Offices. Throughout both periods, all stamps were still valid after their sale in both Australia and the Australian Antarctic Territory.

===== Past stamp designs =====
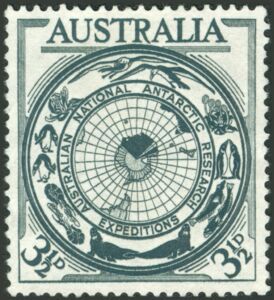
ANTARCTIC RESEARCH COMMEMORATION – Australian stamp

Antarctic Research Commemorative Stamp: (Australian release only)

On the 17th of November 1954, prior to the commencement of the postage system in the Australian Antarctic Territory, a stamp to commemorate the discoveries made and expeditions by

Australians within the Territory was issued throughout mainland Australia. As pictured, it featured several important flora and fauna relevant to certain discoveries, including;

- Black-bowed Albatross (Domeda Melanorphris) (Temminck)
- Kerguelen Cabbage (Pringlea antiscorbutica)
- King Penguin (Aptenodytes patagonica)
- 2 fish breeds; (Cygnodraco mawasoni) and (Notothenia macrocephala)
- Elephant Seal (Miroungra leonine) (Linn)
- Crustaceans (Zooplankton)
- Gentoo Penguin (Pygoscelia papua (Forster)
- Coastal bog plant (Pleurophylum hookeri (Buch))

== First stamp ==
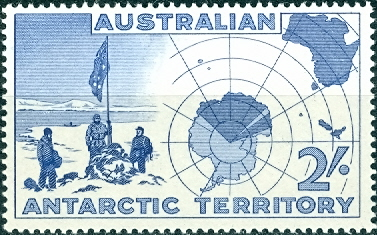
MAP OF ANTARCTICA – Australian Antarctic Territory postage stamp

The first stamp issued specifically for the territory was a two-shilling blue stamp with a design of explorers and an Antarctic map. This was first issued in Australia on 27 March 1957 and in Antarctica on 11 December 1957. The original stamp design of 1957, which included a map of Antarctica, was seen as an "aggressive geopolitical assertion of territory" by the Australians, due to the map clearly marking the territory's boundaries. This caused issues within Antarctica as a whole, as the "issuing of postmarks can only be performed by a sovereign state". However, more than 23,000 letters were stamped with this postmark up until 1959, when several more stamps, such as the ‘Explorers at South Magnetic Pole’ and ‘Dog Sled and Team’ were released.

This stamp also features the flying of the Australian flag, in Vestfold Hills, Antarctica, on 3 March 1954, after a temporary landing in the Antarctic by Peter Shaw, Philip Law, and Dr. Arthur Gwynn. The flag flying image was converted to a drawing from a photograph donated by ANARE (Australian National Antarctic Research Expeditions), showing the three scientists next to the flag waving in the wind. This first stamp was sold at only two shillings per print.

== The first commemorative stamp ==
The first commemorative stamp (as seen in the infobox) of the Australian Antarctic Territory was released on 16 October 1961 to commemorate the 50th anniversary of the first Antarctic Expedition in 1911, led by the Australian scientist and explorer, Sir Douglas Mawson. This stamp features an image of Mawson on this expedition, surrounded by the words "Australian Antarctic Territory". On the day of release for this stamp, Lady Francisca Adriana Mawson, the widowed wife of Mawson, received a "special album on behalf of the Postmaster General, Hon. C. W. Davidson". The album contained a sheet of the minted stamps of Mawson, as well as past Australian Antarctic Territory that had also depicted him, such as ‘Explorers at South Magnetic Pole’ (1959). Similarly, an "imperforate block of four of the Mawson stamps was presented to Sir Thomas Playford, Premier of South Australia, for inclusion in the collection of the National Gallery of South Australia".

== Current postage system ==
Mail is delivered according to the transport schedule of the Australian Antarctic Territory from Hobart International Airport, Tasmania. All mail is consolidated at the Territory's Australian headquarters in Hobart, then consigned to transport, according to the schedule. There are several regulations around the postal system, in order to ensure that it runs smoothly due to the limited movement between the Territory and mainland Australia. Some of these include that all mail over one kilogram is considered to be cargo, whilst mail under one kilogram is considered air mail. All cargo mail leaves Tasmania with cargo flights, rather than on regular transportation flights.

== Recent stamp designs ==
=== 2021 ===
==== March 2021 ====
The stamp issue of 6 March 2021 showed printed images of contributors to the Australian Antarctic Territory Arts Fellowship programme. There is one stamp design for music, painting, photography and sound recording, to "create opportunities for artists to work with art, science and technology partners", as well as use the Australian Antarctic Territory to gain inspiration for their artistic works.

===== Artists featured on the Australian Antarctic Territory Fellowship Stamps =====
- Alice Giles AM:

Giles is featured on the ‘Music’ stamp, capturing her performance on the Harp at centenary of the first Australian Antarctic Expedition.

- Associate Professor Philip Samartzis: (RMIT University, Melbourne)

Samartzis is portrayed on the ‘Sound Recording’ stamp, to capture the ‘experience of working in a unique research station’, and ‘explore the impacts of extreme environmental conditions on people’.

- David Neilson:

Neilson's images from 1990 to 1991 and 2004 to 2005 are featured on the ‘Photography’ stamp, portraying the "great white south"

- John Kelly:

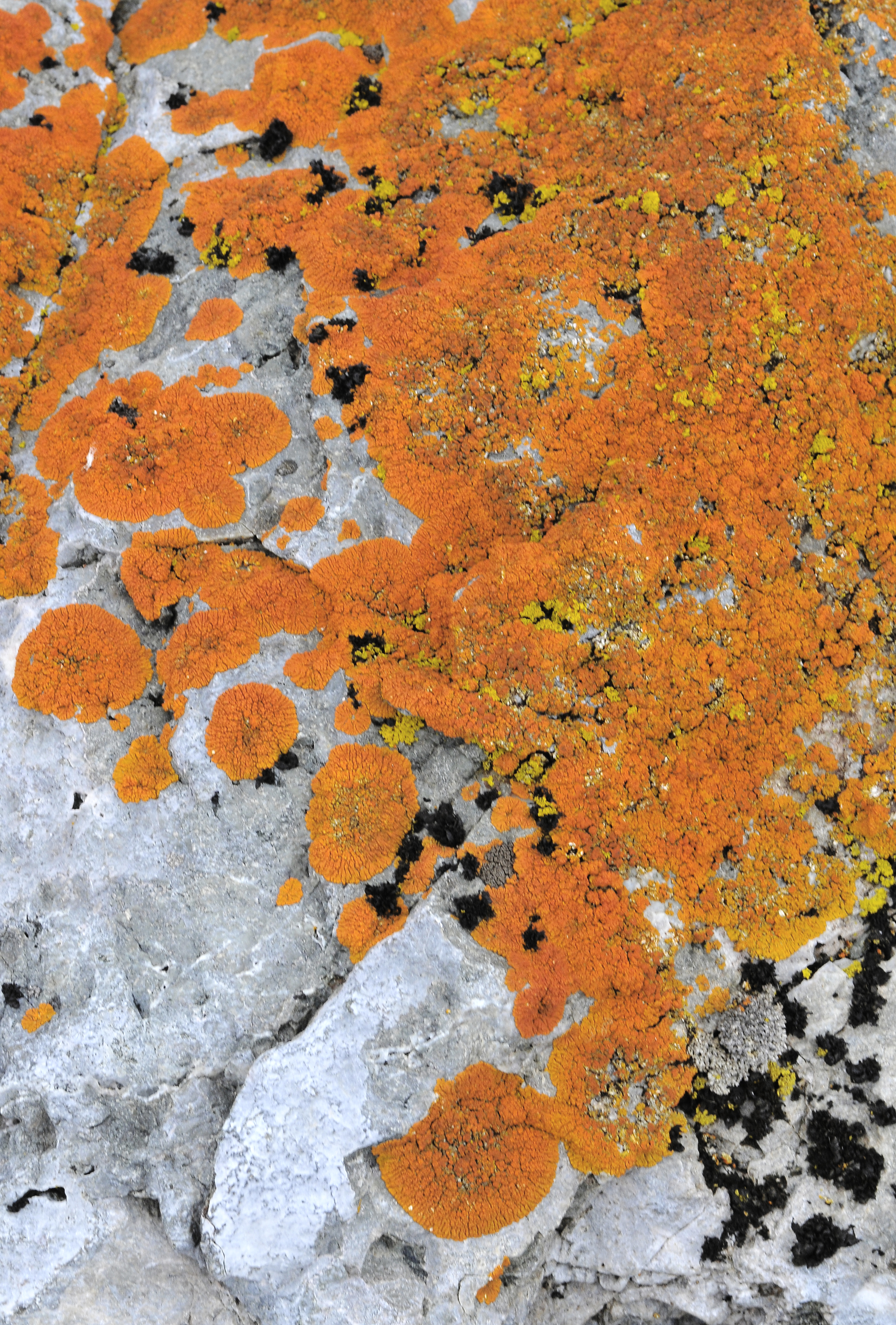
Lichen in Antarctica

The painter and sculptor appears with his highlights of his work; a series of 57 oil paintings from 2013 on the ‘Painting’ stamp.

==== October 2021 ====
This issue, released on 5 October 2021, features four different kinds of Lichen endemic to the AAT.

They are:

- Buellia frigida
- Xanthoria mawsonii
- Umbilicaria decussata
- Xanthoria elegans

== Stamp issues ==
=== Pre-decimal stamps ===
Issue name	Date	Number in Issue	Denominations	Ref.
Definitive Issue	27 March 1957	1	2s	
Definitives	16 December 1959	5	5d, 5d, 8d, 1s, 2/3	
50th Anniversary of the 1911 Mawson Antarctic Expedition	18 October 1961	1	5d	

=== Decimal stamps ===
Issue name	Date	Number in Issue	Denominations	Ref.
Decimal Definitives	28 September 1966	11	1c, 2c, 4c, 5c, 7c, 10c, 10c, 15c, 20c, 25c, 50c, $1	
10th Anniversary of Antarctic Treaty	23 July 1971	2	6c, 30c	
Bicentenary of Cook's Circumnavigation of Antarctica	13 September 1972	2	7c, 35c	
Definitives: Food Chain & Explores’ Aircraft	15 August 1973	12	1c, 5, 7c, 8c, 9c, 10c, 20c, 25c, 30c, 35c, 50c, $1	
50th Anniversary of the First Flight Over the South Pole	20 June 1979	2	20c, 55c	
Definitives: Antarctic Ships	1972-82	16	1c, 2c, 5c, 10c, 15c, 15c, 20c, 22c, 25c, 30c, 35c, 40c, 45c, 50c, $1	
Sir Douglas Mawson Centenary	5 May 1982	2	27c, 75c	
Regional Wildlife	6 April 1983	5	27c, 27c, 27c, 27c, 27c	
12th Antarctic Treaty Consultative Meeting, Canberra	7 September 1983	1	27c	
75th Anniversary of the Expedition to the South Magnetic Pole	16 January 1983	2	30c, 85c	
Definitives: Antarctic Scenes	1984–1987	15	2c, 5c, 10c, 15c, 20c, 25c, 30c, 33c, 36c, 60c, 75c, 85c, 90c, $1	
25th Anniversary of the Antarctic Treaty	17 September 1986	1	36c	
Environment, Conservation & Technology	20 July 1988	5	37c, 37c, 37c, 37c, 37c	
Landscapes – Paintings by Sydney Nolan	14 June 1989	4	39c, 39c, 60c, 80c	
Anniversaries	20 June 1991	2	43c, $1.20	
Antarctic Regional Wildlife	24 May 1992	5	45c, 75c, 85c, 95c, $1.20	
Antarctic Regional Wildlife – Series II	14 January 1993	3	$1, $1.40, $1.50	
The Last Huskies	13 January 1994	4	45c, 75c, 85c, $1.05	
Whales & Dolphins	15 June 1995	4	45c, 45c, 45c, $1	
Antarctic Landscapes	16 May 1996	4	45c, 45c, $1, $1.20	
50th Anniversary of ANARE (Australian National Antarctic Research Expedition)	15 May 1997	5	45c, 45c, 95c, $1.05, $1.20	
Antarctic Territory Transport	5 March 1998	4	45c, 45c, $1, $2	
Mawson	13 May 1999	4	45c, 45c, 90c, $1.35	
Antarctic Penguins	24 July 2000	2	45c, 45c	
Australians in the Antarctic	17 May 2001	20	5c, 5c, 5c, 5c, 5c, 10c, 10c, 10c, 10c, 10c, 25c, 25c, 25c, 25c, 25c, 45c, 45c, 45c, 45c, 45c	
Leopard Seals	11 September 2001	4	45c, 45c, 45c, 45c	
Australian Antarctic Territory Research	2 July 2002	4	45c, 45c, 45c, 45c	
Antarctic Ships	15 April 2003	4	50c, 50c, $1, $1.45	
AAT Mawson Station 1954 – 2004	13 February 2004	4	50c, 50c, $1, $1.45	
Aviation in the AAT	6 September 2005	4	50c, 50c, $1, $1.45	
Fish of the Antarctic Territory	1 August 2006	4	50c, 50c, $1, $1	
Royal Penguins	7 August 2007	4	50c, 50c, $1, $1	
International Polar Year 2007 – 2008	16 September 2008	4	55c, 55c, $1.10, $1.10	
Centenary of the First Expedition to the South Pole 1909 – 2009	8 January 2009	4	55c, 55c, $1.10, $1.10	
Poles & Glaciers	4 March 2009	2	55c, $2.05	
Macquarie Island	26 October 2010	4	60c, 60c, $1.20, $1.20	
Icebergs	7 June 2011	4	60c, 60c, 60c, 60c	
Centenary of the Australasian Antarctic Expedition	2 August 2011	5	60c, 60c, 60c, 60c, 60c	
Phillip Law 1912-2010	6 March 2011	3	60c, $1.20, $1.80	
Centenary of the Australasian Antarctic expedition	4 September 2012	5	60c, 60c, 60c, $1.20, $1.20	
Mountains	12 March 2013	4	60c, 60c, $1.20, $1.80	
Centenary of the Australasian Antarctic Expedition	10 September 2013	5	60c, 60c, 60c, $1.20, $1.20	
Australasian Antarctic Expedition 1914 – Homeward Bound	18 February 2014	5	60c, 60c, 60c, $1.20, $1.20	
Era of the Husky	9 September 2014	4	70c, 70c, $1.40, $1.40	
Colours of the AAT	26 May 2015	4	70c, 70c, $1.40, $1.40	
The Dogs that Saved Macquarie Island	9 September 2015	4	70c, 70c, $1.40, $1.40	
Hurley's Journey	21 June 2016	5	$1, $1, $2, $2, $3	
Hurley's Journey, 1914–16	21 June 2016	5	$1, $1, $2, $2, $3	
Ice Flowers	20 September 2016	4	$1, $1, $2, $3	
East Antarctic Deep Sea Creatures	7 March 2017	4	$1, $1, $2, $2	
Cultural Heritage	19 September 2017	3	$1, $1, $2	
Crabeater Seal	27 March 2018	4	$1, $1, $2, $2	
RSV Aurora Australis – 30 Years	25 September 2018	4	$1, $1, $2, $2	
Casey Research Station	26 March 2019	4	$1, $1, $2, $2	
Mapping the AAT	20 August 2019	4	$1, $1, $2, $2	
Wyatt Earp Expedition, 1948	31 March 2020	3	$1.10, $1.10, $3.30	
RSV Nuyina	11 September 2020	4	$1.10, $1.10, $2.20, $2.20	
Australian Antarctic Territory Arts Fellowship	16 March 2021	4	$1.10, $1.10, $2.20, $2.20	
Australian Antarctic Territory Lichen	5 October 2021	4	$1.10, $1.10, $2.20, $3.30	
AAT Penguins	22 March 2022	4	$1.10, $1.10, $2.20, $2.20	

== Used stamps ==
Used stamps from the territory are usually found with either mainland Australia postal cancels, or first-day cover cancels as there is relatively little genuine mail from the bases.

== Bases ==
The Australian Antarctic Territory bases are:

- Casey Station
- Davis Station
- Macquarie Island Station
- Mawson Station
- Heard Island
- Cape Denison (Opened 2010)
- Wilkes Station (now closed)

Base cover sets are issued from Mawson, Davis, Casey and Macquarie Island stations.

All AAT mail will be cancelled with a postmark from one of these bases, though first day covers are now thought to be cancelled with the relevant base name at the Australian Philatelic Bureau, and not all bases are currently in use or permanently occupied.
