= Conjunctive use (philately) =

In philately, the term conjunctive use refers to the simultaneous use of different types of postage stamps to pay separate parts of a postal charge on the same letter.

Examples include the addition of an adhesive postage stamp to an item of postal stationery already bearing an imprinted stamp to pay additional postal charges such as airmail or registration charges, or the part transport of mail by a local postal service. Such covers are known as conjunctive covers.
