= Telephone numbers in the Australian Antarctic Territory =

Country Code: +672 1x (partial)
International Call Prefix: 0011
Trunk Prefix:

National Significant Numbers (NSN):

six digits (fixed)
six digits (mobile)

Format: +672 1X XXXX

Telephone numbers in the Australian Antarctic Territory use the same country code as Telephone numbers in Norfolk Island.

== Numbering ==
NUMBERING
Station	Current
Davis	+672 10 XXXX
Mawson	+672 11 XXXX
Casey	+672 12 XXXX
Macquarie Island	+672 13 XXXX
Aurora Australis, Wilkins and mobile phones	+672 14 XXXX
