= Postage stamps and postal history of Hatay =

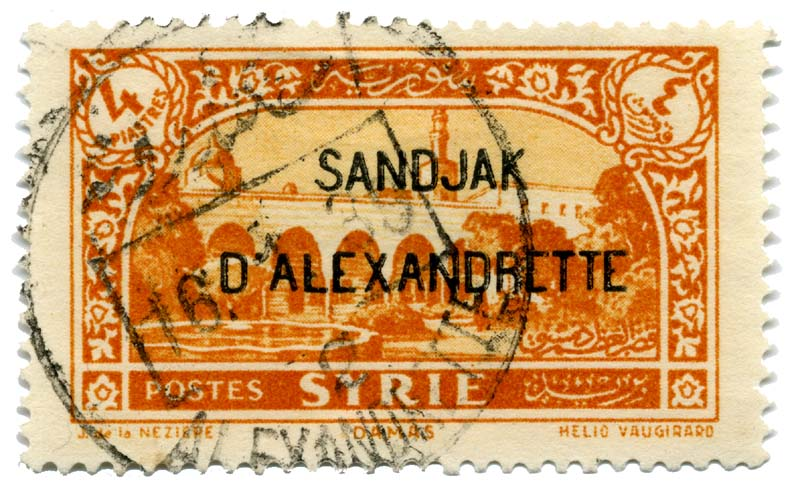
A 4-piastre Syrian postage stamps overprinted and issued in 1938 for the Sanjak of Alexandretta, cancelled sometime in 1939

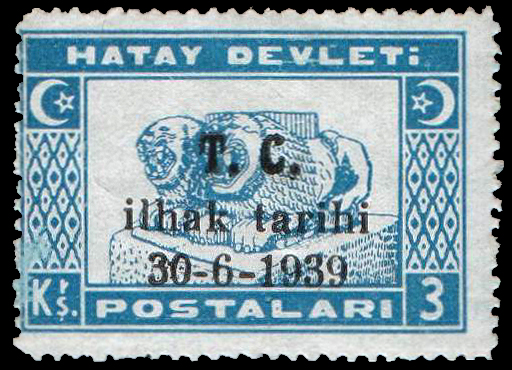
Stamp of Hatay overprinted "T. C. ilhak tarihi 30-6-1939" (Annexation 30-6-1939)

This is a survey of the postage stamps and postal history of Hatay State, formerly the Sanjak of Alexandretta of the French Mandate of Syria.

== Background ==
After the First World War the Sanjak of Alexandretta became part of the French Mandate of Syria, under a special statute, but Turkey demanded its return as the area was ethnically divided between Turks, Sunni Arabs, and large numbers of Alawites.

On September 2, 1938, the Sanjak of Alexandretta was proclaimed as the Hatay State. In July 1939, the Hatay State was annexed to Turkey as the Hatay Province.

== Postage stamps ==
France overprinted Syrian postage stamps in 1938 for use in the Sanjak of Alexandretta. The Hatay State issued stamps in 1939. After the annexation of Hatay into Turkey, stamps of Hatay were overprinted “T.C. ilhak tarihi 30-6-1939”.

== Sources ==
- Stanley Gibbons Ltd: various catalogues
- Encyclopaedia of Postal Authorities
- Rossiter, Stuart & John Flower. The Stamp Atlas. London: Macdonald, 1986. ISBN 0-356-10862-7
