= Postage stamps and postal history of the Alawite State =

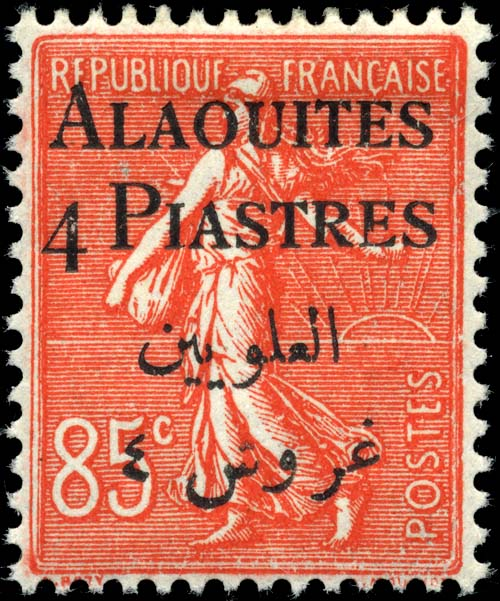
4-piastre overprint on 85-centime "Sower" of France

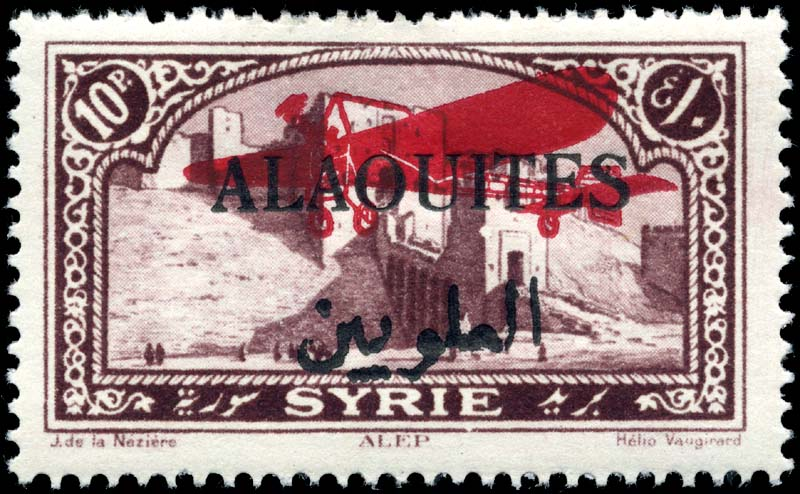
A double overprint; an airplane (indicating airmail) on "ALAOUITES" on 10-piastre stamp of Syria

The Alawite State or the Alaouites (Fr.) was located between the Turkish province of Hatay (formerly the Syrian province of Alexandretta) and Lebanon. Geographically within Syria, the Alawite state was administered under a French mandate between 1920 and 1930 and as the Sanjak of Latakia from 1930. From 5 December 1936 (effective in 1937) it was fully incorporated into Syria.

== Alaouites ==
France never designed postage stamps specifically for the Alawite state. There was an initial period in which Syrian stamps were used, inevitably causing accounting difficulties between the Alawite and Syrian postal services. In 1925, French stamps were overprinted "ALAOUITES" followed by a denomination in piastres (French stamps being denominated in francs) and this was followed by the same information in Arabic.

Later between 1925 and 1930, similar overprints were used on stamps of Syria. Airmail overprints included the word "AVION" and after 1926 a picture of a monoplane.

== Latakia ==
From 1931 to 1936, stamps of Syria were overprinted "Lattaquie" in French and Arabic.

== References and sources ==
Sources

- Stanley Gibbons Ltd: various catalogues
- Encyclopaedia of Postal History
