= List of Malian flags =

Flags of Mali

The Following is a list of flags used in Mali.

== National flag ==
Flag	Date	Use	Description
	1961–present	Flag of Mali	A vertical tricolour of green, gold, and red.

== Azawad flags ==
=== Separatist flags ===
Flag	Date	Use	Description
	2011	Proposed flag for Azawad	Two equal horizontal bands of blue (top) and white with a red isosceles triangle based on the hoist side.
	2011	Proposed flag for Azawad	A white field with a blue star and crescent in the center.
	2012–present	Flag of the National Movement for the Liberation of Azawad	A horizontal tricolor of green, red, and black with a yellow triangle based on the hoist side. Used as the national flag of the unrecognized State of Azawad from 2012 to 2013.

=== Flags of armed groups and political organizations ===
Flag	Date	Use	Description
	2012–present	Flag of the Arab Movement of Azawad	A horizontal tricolor of green, white, and black with a red star and crescent in the center.
	2014–present	Flag(s) of the Coordination of Azawad Movements	A red field charged with white text reading "CMA".
	2014–present	Flag(s) of the Coordination of Azawad Movements	A horizontal tricolor of green, white, and red with a yellow star in the center.
	2014–present	Flag of the Imghad Tuareg Self-Defense Group and Allies	A blue field with a red Tifinagh letter "ⵣ" (which represents the sound [z]) in the center.
	2014–present	Flag of the Popular Movement for the Salvation of Azawad	A horizontal tricolour of red, white, and black; with a green triangle based at the hoist and four five-pointed green stars in the white stripe.
	2016–present	Flag of the Congress for Justice in Azawad	A white field with a blue band crossing the flag from the top-left corner to the bottom-right.
	2016–present	Flag of the Movement for the Salvation of Azawad	Two equal horizontal bands of green (top) and yellow with a blue isosceles triangle based on the hoist side.
	2018–present	Flag of the Alliance for Salvation in the Sahel	A horizontal tricolor of white, red, and black.
	c.2020	Flag used by Ganda Iso	A vertical tricolor of red, green, and white.

== Historical flags ==
=== Mali Empire ===
Flag	Date	Use	Description
	c.1324	Imperial flag of Musa I (possible)	A reconstruction of the banner used by Musa I on the Hajj, a possible historical flag of the Mali Empire, consisting of a yellow rectangle centered on a red field.

=== Local kingdoms ===
Flag	Date	Use	Description
	1878–1898	Flag of the Wassoulou Empire	A horizontal tricolor of blue, cyan, and white with a red triangle based on the hoist side and a seven-pointed star inside of the triangle with a little red diamond inside the star.

=== Under French colonial rule ===
Flag	Date	Use	Description
	1880–1958	Flag of French Sudan	Three vertical stripes arranged from hoist to fly in blue, white, and red.
	1958–1959	Flag of French Sudan	The French tricolor with a black Kanaga mask centered on the white band.
	1959–1960	Flag of the Mali Federation	A vertical tricolor of green, gold, and red with a black Kanaga mask centered on the gold band.

=== Independence ===
Flag	Date	Use	Description
	1960–1961	Flag of Mali	A vertical tricolor of green, gold, and red with a black Kanaga mask centered on the gold band.

== See also ==
- Flag of Mali
- Coat of arms of Mali
