= Postage stamps and postal history of Senegambia and Niger =

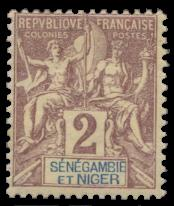
Stamp of Senegambia and Niger, 1903

Senegambia and Niger was a short-lived administrative unit of the French possessions in Africa, formed in 1902 and reorganized in 1904 into Upper Senegal and Niger.

Despite its brief existence, the French government-issued postage stamps for the administrative unit, in the form of a version of its Navigation and Commerce series, inscribed "SENEGAMBIE / ET NIGER". The set consisted of 13 values, from 1 centime to 1 franc.

== See also ==
- Postage stamps and postal history of French Sudan
- Postage stamps and postal history of The Gambia
- Postage stamps and postal history of Upper Senegal and Niger
