= Postage stamps and postal history of Mali =

A 1963 stamp of Mali

This is a survey of the postage stamps and postal history of Mali.

Mali is a landlocked country in Western Africa bordering Algeria to the north, Niger to the east, Burkina Faso and the Côte d'Ivoire to the south, Guinea to the south-west, and Senegal and Mauritania to the west. Its size is just over 1,240,000 km² with a population more than 14 million. Its capital is Bamako.

The Mali Republic was created in September 1960 and occupies roughly the same territory as the former French Sudan. It replaced the previous, short lived, Mali Federation between French Sudan and Senegal.

== Before 1959 ==
From 1894 to 1902, the colony of French Sudan used the general issues of the French colonies (Alpheus Dubois and Group types) with the name of the colony. In 1903, the group-type stamps were marked "SENEGAMBIA AND NIGER", the new name of the colony. In 1906, new stamps were issued marked "Upper Senegal and Niger", a state which came into existence in 1904, with varied illustrations including colonial personalities: General Louis Faidherbe and Governor General Noël Ballay in 1906 and a Tuareg horseman in 1914. All the above stamps of this colony with its successive names became uncommon for letters until 1920.

In 1920, Upper Senegal and Niger became French Sudan and some of its regions became Upper Volta and Niger. The Tuareg horseman stamps were widely used in these three colonies until the late 1920s. From 1931 to 1944, the subjects were the Colonial Exhibition of 1931, Pierre and Marie Curie, the explorer René Caillié or the anniversary of the storming of the Bastille. But the subjects of the issues from 1931 became the most common. They include a Fulani milkmaid, the door of the Djenne residence, and a boatman on the river Niger. From 1944 to 1959, the French West Africa issues were used in the French Sudan.

== Mali Federation ==
The first stamps of the Mali Federation were issued on 7 November 1959. In 1959 and early 1960 nine stamps were issued in the name of the short-lived Federation of Mali which consisted of Senegal and French Sudan. They depict symbols of the Federation with a series of fish and a common issue with some other of former French colonies in Africa. But tensions quickly arose between the two states of the new federation. Senegal then seceded, while the former Sudan retained the name of Mali, as well as the use of the Federation stamps. The stamps of the defunct federation are rare on letters, especially as in 1961 the remaining stock was overprinted "RÉPUBLIQUE DU MALI".

== Mali Republic ==
The first stamps of the Mali Republic were issued in September 1960. The first two definitive issues were the presidents of the Republic of Mali: Mamadou Konaté and Modibo Keïta, the third representing the anniversary of independence. Mali's stamp represented local issues include economic activities, flora and fauna, traditions. International issues soon appeared: the Olympics and the anniversaries of the presidents of the United States. From 1964, initiatives to overcome locusts led to three issues.

== See also ==
- Postage stamps and postal history of French Sudan
- Revenue stamps of Mali
