= Flag of French Sudan =

Proportion: 2:3

The flag of French Sudan was the French tricolour, used by most French colonial possessions, with a black stick figure with arms raised, a so-called kanaga. The flag continued to be used when the colony gained autonomy from France in 1958, but its colors were changed to green, yellow and red with the adoption of the flag of the independent Mali Federation in 1959.

== See also ==
- Flag of Mali
- French colonial flags
