= Kanaga =

Kanaga may refer to:

- Kanaga Island in the Andreanof Islands group of the Aleutian Islands in Alaska
- Kanaga Volcano, a volcano on Kanaga Island
- Kanaga, Iran, a village in Ardabil Province, Iran
- Kanaga, web series, KANAGA is an independent international Web Series starring Mehmet Günsür
- Kanaga, a human effigy tribal figure on the original Flag of Mali
