= National Anthem of the Mali Federation =

Historical anthem of the Mali Federation

Coat of Arms of the Mali Federation

The National Anthem of the Mali Federation is a former national anthem that was created per the Federation's Official Law of 18 June 1960. It uses the music of the current national anthem of Mali composed by Banzumana Sissoko, and its lyrics are a slightly modified version of those of the national anthem of Senegal written by Léopold Sédar Senghor. After separation of the two countries, Mali kept the music (as the composer was from this country) and Senegal retained the lyrics of the Federation (which was written by who would become the first Senegalese President), albeit removing the name "Mali" among other minor changes.

== Lyrics ==
French original

Pincez tous vos koras, frappez les balafons.
Le lion rouge a rugi, le dompteur de la brousse.
D'un bond s'est élancé, dissipant les ténèbres.
Soleil sur nos terreurs, soleil sur notre espoir.
Debout, debout mes frères ! Voici l'Afrique rassemblée.

Refrain :
Fibres de mon cœur vert. Ô Maliennes et Maliens,
Unissons la mer et les sources, unissons la steppe et la forêt !
Épaule contre épaule, sont mes plus que frères,
Salut Afrique mère, salut Afrique mère !

Toi, Mali, toi, le fils de l'écume du lion,
Toi surgi de la nuit au galop des chevaux,
Rend-nous, oh ! rends-nous l'honneur de nos ancêtres,
Splendides comme ébène et forts comme le muscle
Nous disons droits : l'épée, l'épée n'a pas une bavure.

Refrain

Ô Mali, nous faisons nôtre ton grand dessein :
Rassembler les poussins à l'abri des milans
Pour en faire, de l'est à l'ouest, du nord au sud,
Debout, un même peuple, un peuple sans couture
Mais un peuple tourné vers tous les vents du monde.

Refrain

Ô Mali, comme toi, comme tous nos héros,
Nous serons durs sans haine et des deux bras ouverts.
L'épée, nous la mettrons dans la paix du fourreau,
Car le travail sera notre arme et la parole.
Le Bantou est un frère, et nous et l'Arabe et le Blanc.

Refrain

Mais que si l'ennemi incendie nos frontières,
Nous serons tous dressés et les armes au poing :
Un peuple dans sa foi défiant tous les malheurs,
Les jeunes et les vieux, les hommes et les femmes.
La mort, oui ! Nous disons la mort, mais pas la honte.

Refrain

English translation

Strum all your koras, strike the balafons.
The red lion roared, tamer of the bush.
With a leap sprang up, dispelling the darkness.
Sun on our terrors, sun on our hope.
Arise, arise my brothers! Here is Africa gathered.

Chorus:
Fibers of my green heart. O Malian daughters and sons,
Let us unite the sea and the sources, and unite the steppe and the forest!
Shoulder to shoulder, are my more than brothers,
Hail, Mother Africa! Hail, Mother Africa!

You, Mali, you, the daughter of the lion's foam,
You emerged from the night at the gallop of the horses,
Give us back, oh! give us the honor of our ancestors,
Splendid as ebony and strong as muscle,
We say rights: the sword, the sword has not a burr.

Chorus

O Mali, we make your great plan our own:
Gather the chicks away from the kites.
To make it, from east to west, from north to south,
Standing, as one people, one seamless people
But a people turned towards all winds of the world.

Chorus

O Mali, like you, like all our heroes,
Tough we shall be without hatred and with open arms.
The sword we shall put in the peace of the scabbard
Because work will be our weapon and our word.
The Bantu are our brothers, as are the Arabs and the Whites.

Chorus

But if the enemy burns down our borders,
We shall all be erect and our guns in hand:
A people in their faith defying all misfortunes,
Young and old, men and women.
Death, yes! We say death, but not shame.

Chorus
