= Revenue stamps of Mali =

Revenue stamps issued since the independence of Mali

Revenue stamps of Mali have been issued since the country's independence in 1960, and before that, the colony of French Sudan also had its revenue stamps. The first issue after independence consisted of revenue stamps of France of the "Daussy" key type overprinted REPUBLIQUE DU MALI.

A second set of revenue stamps had a similar design to the first issue but incorporated the coat of arms of Mali, which was issued in around 1973. Since then, three other stamps have been issued, all bearing the coat of arms and local sculptures. All known Mali revenue stamps are inscribed Timbre Fiscal, for general-duty fiscal purposes.

The use of revenue stamps has mostly been limited to the southern part of Mali, partly due to the instability in northern Mali. Revenues are most commonly seen on passports or other travel and identity documents. Mali revenue stamps are also used in the country's diplomatic missions abroad.

== See also ==
- Postage stamps and postal history of Mali
