= Le Mali =

National anthem of Mali

English: Mali
- National anthem of Mali
- Also known as: "Pour l'Afrique et pour toi, Mali" or "Afiriki ye ani e ye, Mali" (English: "For Africa and for you, Mali") "À ton appel Mali" (English: "At your call, Mali")
- Lyrics: Seydou Badian Kouyaté
- Music: Banzumana Sissoko
- Adopted: 9 August 1962

Audio sample
- U.S. Navy Band abridged instrumental version in A-flat major (equivalent to the last four lines of a verse and the chorus): file; help

"Le Mali" (English: "The Mali") is the national anthem of Mali. Adopted in 1962, it was written by Seydou Badian Kouyaté, while the music is attributed to Banzumana Sissoko. It is popularly known as "Pour l'Afrique et pour toi, Mali" (English: "For Africa and for you, Mali") or "À ton appel Mali" (English: "At your call, Mali").

== History ==
The anthem was written by Seydou Badian Kouyaté around the time of the dissolution of the Mali Federation with Senegal in 1960, which left Mali without a flag or anthem. In a 2010 interview, Kouyaté stated that President Modibo Keïta had been passing through his locality when he approached Kouyaté and asked him to create a song to help the youth remember Malian pre-independence politician Mamadou Konaté. Kouyaté created a song called "Ô jeunesse, c'est le jour de l'Afrique, belle espoir". Keïta then called Kouyaté and told him to try creating something for the national anthem. Kouyaté made a draft for a national anthem and sang it with Keïta, who was pleased with it. Kouyaté stated that Keïta had previously received a proposal for a national anthem by a European pianist residing in the Malian capital, Bamako, but he rejected it, because he wanted something that had an aura of Africa and Mali. Kouyaté reworked an air dating back to the 13th century and the Mali Empire. The musical arrangement is credited to jeli Banzumana Sissoko.

The anthem was officially adopted just under a year after independence, by law n° 62-72 of 9 August 1962. The Malian Young Pioneer movement of the 1960s translated it into Bambara for its rallies as "Afiriki ye ani e ye, Mali". The translation is credited to Abdulay Bari. It is traditionally played at state ceremonies by the band of the Garde Républicaine of the Armed Forces of Mali.

== Lyrics ==
French original

I
À ton appel Mali
Pour ta prospérité
Fidèle à ton destin
Nous serons tous unis
Un peuple, un but, une foi
Pour une Afrique Unie
Si l'ennemi découvre son front
Au dedans ou au dehors
Debout sur les remparts
Nous sommes résolus de mourir

Refrain :
Pour l'Afrique et pour toi, Mali,
Notre drapeau sera liberté.
Pour l'Afrique et pour toi, Mali,
Notre combat sera unité.
Ô Mali d'aujourd'hui
Ô Mali de demain
Les champs fleurissent d'espérance
Les cœurs vibrent de confiance

II
Debout villes et campagnes
Debout femmes, jeunes et vieux
Pour la patrie en marche
Vers l'avenir radieux
Pour notre dignité
Renforçons bien nos rangs
Pour le salut public
Forgeons le bien commun
Ensemble au coude à coude
Faisons le sentier du bonheur

Refrain

III
La voie est dure très dure
Qui mène au bonheur commun
Courage et dévouement
Vigilance à tout moment
Vérité des temps anciens
Vérité de tous les jours
Le bonheur par le labeur
Fera le Mali de demain

Refrain

IV
L'Afrique se lève enfin
Saluons ce jour nouveau
Saluons la liberté
Marchons vers l'unité
Dignité retrouvée
Soutient notre combat
Fidèle à notre serment
De faire l'Afrique unie
Ensemble debout mes frères
Tous au rendez-vous de l'honneur

Refrain

Bambara lyrics

I
Mali man'a kan bɔ
ɲɛtaa kɛlɛba don
An bɛɛ b'an cɛsiri
Ka lahidu tiimɛ
So, haju, ŋaniya kelen
Farafinna kelenya
Jugu man'a kun bɔ
Kɔnɔna o Kɛnɛma
Bɛɛ ka wuli k'i jɔ
Saya ka fisa malo ye

Laminɛni:
Farafinna n'an faso Mali
Jɔnjɔn in ko: hɔrɔnya bɛrɛ
Farafinna n'an faso Mali
Kɛlɛ in ko: kelenya kɛlɛ
Un! Mali tile bɛ bi
Un! Mali tile bɛ sini
Jigiya forow funtira kayira
Denw hakili latigɛra pewu pewu

II
Wuli so ni kungo
Muso cɛ ni denmisɛn
Wuli ɲɛtaa kama
Bɛɛ ka wasa sini
Faso danbe kama
An ka an ka jɛ sinsin
Jama hɛrɛ kosɔn
Foroba ka yiriwa ka
An bolo di ɲɔgɔn ma
Ka daamu forobaci kɛ.

Laminɛni

III
Sira ka gɛlɛn haali
Jamana nafa sira
Dusu ani kaari
Badaa janto jugu la
Tiɲɛ kunun tiɲɛ
Tiɲɛ bi ni sini
Mali bɔ nɔgɔ la o
Sabu dan ye baara ye.

Laminɛni

IV
Farafinna dan ka wuli
Taare ! fiɲɛ kura
Taare ! mahɔrɔnya
Kelenya sira magɛn
Danbe seginna an ma
Ka cɛsiri sinsin
Farafinna kelenya
Layidu tiimɛ kama
A’ ye wuli n badenw
Bɛɛ ka ye o dawulakɛnɛ kan.

Laminɛni

English translation

I
At your call, Mali
For your prosperity
Loyal towards your destiny
We will be all united,
One people, one goal, one faith,
For a united Africa
If the enemy should show himself
Inside or outside,
Standing on the ramparts,
We are ready to die.

Chorus:
For Africa and for you, Mali,
Our banner shall be liberty.
For Africa and for you, Mali,
Our fight shall be for unity.
Oh, Mali of today,
Oh, Mali of tomorrow,
The fields are flowering with hope
Hearts are thrilling with confidence.

II
Standing town and country
Standing women, young and old
For the country moving
Towards a bright future
For our dignity
Let us strengthen our ranks well
For the public salvation
Let us forge the common good
Together shoulder to shoulder
Let us make the path of happiness

Chorus

III
The path is hard very hard
Which leads to common happiness
Courage and dedication
Vigilance at all times
Truth of ancient times
Truth everyday
Happiness through labour
Will make the Mali of tomorrow

Chorus

IV
Africa finally rises
Let us welcome this new day
Let us welcome liberty
Let us march towards unity
New found dignity
Support our fight
True to our oath
Of making Africa united
My brothers standing together
All at the appointment of honour

Chorus
