= Postage stamps and postal history of Upper Senegal and Niger =

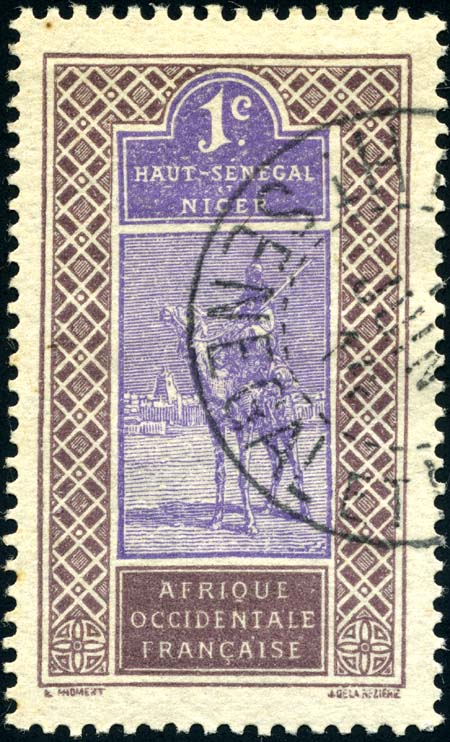
1-centime value of the camel and rider design, used in June 1914

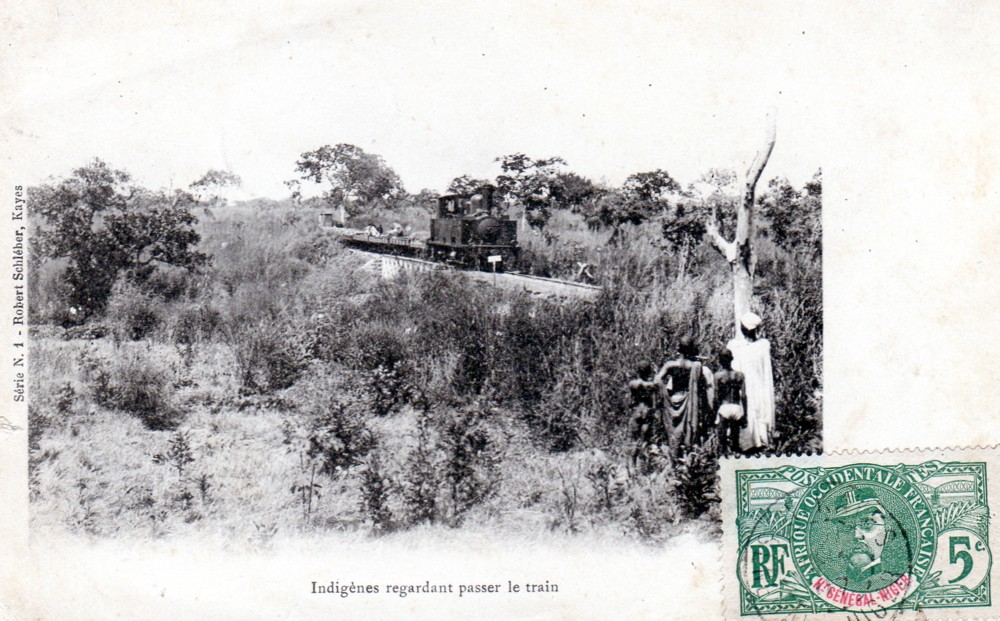
A postcard bearing a 5 centime Upper Senegal and Niger stamp with the portrait of Louis Léon César Faidherbe

Upper Senegal and Niger was a colony in French West Africa created in 1904 from Senegambia and Niger. Niger became a separate military district in 1911 and a separate colony in 1922, Upper Volta was split off in 1919, and the remainder reorganized as French Sudan in 1920. The capital was Bamako.

The colony issued a number of postage stamps during its short existence. The first issue was part of the 1906 omnibus issue of the French West Africa, consisting of 17 stamps in three designs: portraits of Louis Faidherbe, Eugene Ballay, and an oil palm, with values ranging from 1 centime to 5 francs. Another series of 17 followed in 1914, all of same design—a camel with its rider—but each printed in a different pair of colours.

In addition, in 1915 the 10c stamp of 1914 was surcharged an additional 5c and sold as a semi-postal stamp. Sets of postage due stamps were also issued in 1906 and 1914. Stamps of French Sudan superseded all of these in 1921.

== See also ==
- Postage stamps and postal history of Niger
- Postage stamps and postal history of Senegal
