= Haoua Issa =

Nigerian singer

- Born: 1920 (age 105–106)
- Citizenship: Niger
- Occupation: Singer

Haoua Issa (sometimes called Haoua Zaley) (1925/1927 - 23 September 1990) was a Nigerien singer.

Issa was one of the Koirategui nobility of the Dosso Kingdom, being related to one of its zarmakoy, Alpha Atta. She chose to follow a career as a praise singer, a role usually occupied by griots, held to be an inferior class; this led to a longstanding rift with other members of her family. She became famous for her skills in the zaley genre, and became quite well-off as a result of her performances, finding as she did an audience in Nigerien male society of the 1940s and 1950s. It is believed that she was the first Nigerien musician to derive benefit from the country's copyright laws. She retired from singing in the 1960s. Her likeness was featured on a 1992 Nigerien postage stamp.
