= Postage stamps and postal history of French Sudan =

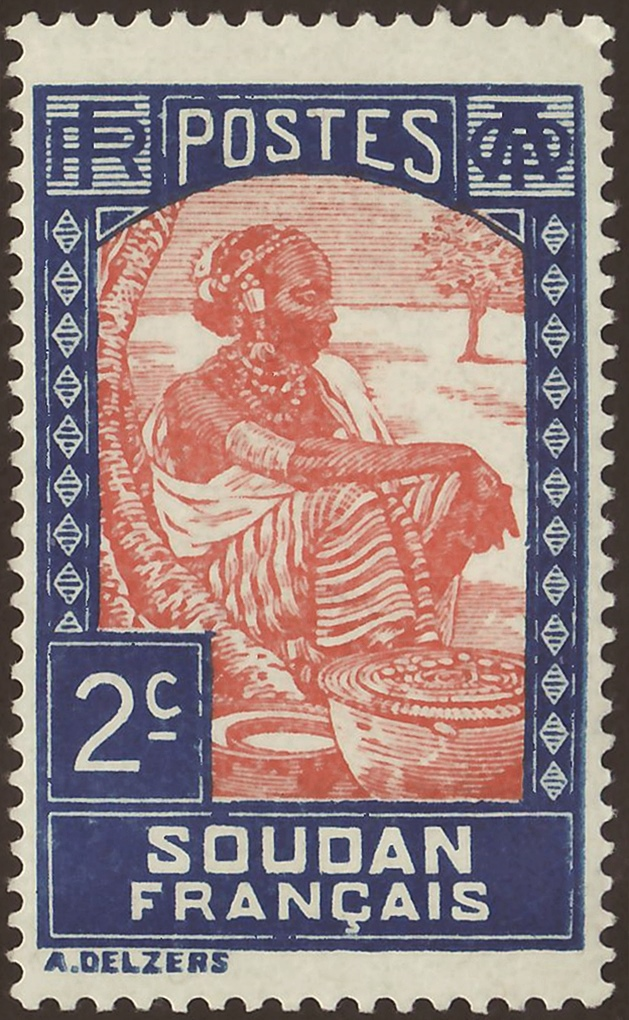
1931 French Sudan Stamp

French Sudan (Soudan Français) was established in the late nineteenth century and occupied roughly the same territory as modern Mali.

== First stamps ==
From 1894 to 1902, the colony of French Sudan used the general issues of the French colonies (Alphée Dubois and Group types) with the name of the colony. In 1903, the group-type stamps were marked "SENEGAMBIA AND NIGER", the new name of the colony. In 1906, new stamps were issued marked "Upper Senegal and Niger", a state which came into existence in 1904, with varied illustrations including colonial personalities: General Louis Faidherbe and Governor-General Noël Ballay in 1906 and a Tuareg horseman in 1914. All the above stamps of this colony with its successive names became uncommon for letters until 1920.

In 1920, Upper Senegal and Niger became French Sudan and some of its regions became Upper Volta and Niger. The Tuareg horseman stamps were widely used in these three colonies until the late 1920s. From 1931 to 1944, the subjects were the Colonial Exhibition of 1931, Pierre and Marie Curie, the explorer René Caillié or the anniversary of the storming of the Bastille. But the subjects of the issues from 1931 became the most common. They include a Fulani milkmaid, the door of the Djenne residence, and a boatman on the river Niger.

== French West Africa ==
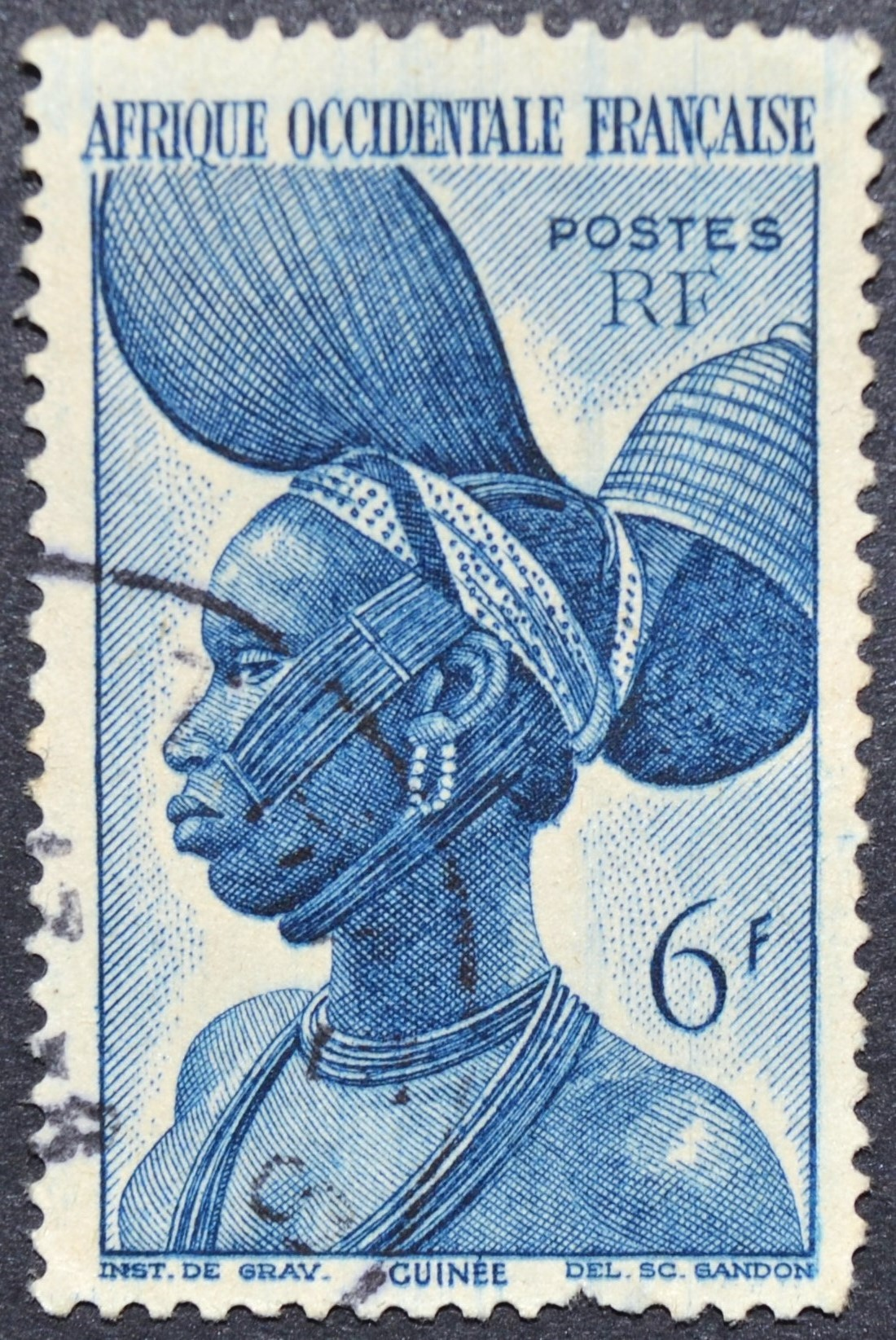
French West Africa 1947 series

From 1944 to 1959, the French West Africa issues were used in the French Sudan.

Various territories were joined in 1895 by the French colonial authorities in a federation known as French West Africa (AOF). These territories included Mauritania, Senegal, French Sudan (now Mali), French Guinea (now Guinea), Côte d'Ivoire, Niger, Upper Volta (now Burkina Faso) and Dahomey (now Benin). The French colonial territories in the federation issued their own postage stamps until 1943. In many cases, the stamps were inscribed with the name of the federation "Afrique Occidentale Française" as well as the colony's own name.

In 1943 and 1944, stamps of Senegal and Mauritania were overprinted with new values and valid throughout French West Africa.

The first issues printed specifically for the federation were the Eboue common design type and a definitive series depicting colonial soldiers, both in 1945. A series of 1947 featured 19 scenes and people of the various colonies, then during the 1950s, there were about 30 various commemoratives. The last issue inscribed "Afrique occidentale française" and "RF" was the Human Rights issue of December 1958.

It was followed by a Stamp Day issue on March 21, 1959, which omitted the federation's name and was inscribed "CF" along with "Dakar-Abidjan" for use in Ivory Coast and Senegal.

== Independence ==
French Sudan joined in a short-lived federation with Senegal in 1959, but ties to both countries quickly weakened. In 1960, French Sudan formally became the Republic of Mali.

== See also ==
- Postage stamps and postal history of Senegambia and Niger
- Postage stamps and postal history of Upper Senegal and Niger
- Postage stamps and postal history of Mali
- French colonial flags
- French Colonial Empire
- List of French possessions and colonies

== References and sources ==
Sources

- Stanley Gibbons catalogue
