= Mali at the 2017 World Aquatics Championships =

- Flag of Mali
- FINA code: MLI
- National federation: Federation Malienne de Natation

in Budapest, Hungary
- Competitors: 3 in 1 sport
- Medals: Gold 0 Silver 0 Bronze 0 Total 0

World Aquatics Championships appearances
- 1973; 1975; 1978; 1982; 1986; 1991; 1994; 1998; 2001; 2003; 2005; 2007; 2009; 2011; 2013; 2015; 2017; 2019; 2022; 2023; 2024

Mali competed at the 2017 World Aquatics Championships in Budapest, Hungary from 14 July to 30 July.

== Swimming ==
Mali has received a Universality invitation from FINA to send three swimmers (two men and one woman) to the World Championships.

Athlete	Event	Heat		Semifinal		Final	
Athlete	Event	Time	Rank	Time	Rank	Time	Rank
Sébastien Kouma	Men's 50 m breaststroke	29.92	53	Did not advance			
Sébastien Kouma	Men's 100 m breaststroke	1:05.03	54	Did not advance			
Oumar Toure	Men's 50 m butterfly	DSQ		Did not advance			
Oumar Toure	Men's 100 m butterfly	57.52	62	Did not advance			
Fatoumata Konate	Women's 50 m freestyle	DNS		Did not advance			
Fatoumata Konate	Women's 50 m breaststroke	DNS		Did not advance			
