= Mali at the 2024 World Aquatics Championships =

- Flag of Mali
- FINA code: MLI
- National federation: Fédération Malienne de Natation

in Doha, Qatar
- Competitors: 3 in 1 sport
- Medals: Gold 0 Silver 0 Bronze 0 Total 0

World Aquatics Championships appearances
- 1973; 1975; 1978; 1982; 1986; 1991; 1994; 1998; 2001; 2003; 2005; 2007; 2009; 2011; 2013; 2015; 2017; 2019; 2022; 2023; 2024

Mali competed at the 2024 World Aquatics Championships in Doha, Qatar from 2 to 18 February.

== Competitors ==
The following is the list of competitors in the Championships.

Sport	Men	Women	Total
Swimming	2	1	3
Total	2	1	3

== Swimming ==
Mali entered 3 swimmers.

Men

Athlete	Event	Heat		Semifinal		Final	
Athlete	Event	Time	Rank	Time	Rank	Time	Rank
Alexien Kouma	50 metre freestyle	24.77	76	Did not advance			
Alexien Kouma	100 metre freestyle	55.13	85	Did not advance			
Sébastien Kouma	50 metre breaststroke	31.99	51	Did not advance			
Sébastien Kouma	100 metre breaststroke	1:14.39	71	Did not advance			

Women

Athlete	Event	Heat		Semifinal		Final	
Athlete	Event	Time	Rank	Time	Rank	Time	Rank
Aïchata Diabaté	100 metre freestyle	1:30.74	84	Did not advance			
Aïchata Diabaté	50 metre backstroke	52.22	54	Did not advance			
