= Postage stamps and postal history of Niger =

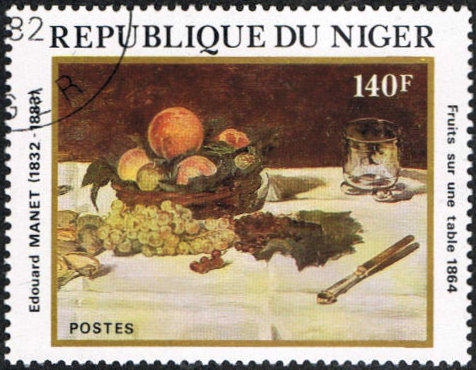
Fruits on a table by Edouard Manet (1864) on a 1982 stamp of Niger

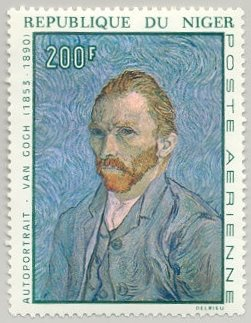
A 1968 stamp of Niger

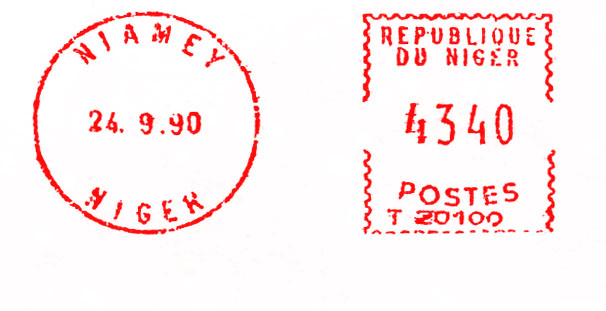
A 1990 meter stamp of Niger from Niamey

This is a survey of the postage stamps and postal history of Niger, a former French colony that obtained independence in 1960.

Niger is a landlocked country in West Africa named after the Niger River. It borders Nigeria and Benin to the south, Burkina Faso and Mali to the west, Algeria and Libya to the north and Chad to the east. Niger covers a land area of almost 1,270,000 km^{2}, over 80 percent of which is covered by the Sahara desert. The capital city is Niamey.

== First stamps ==
In 1920, Niger was separated from Upper Senegal & Niger and became a separate colony in 1922.

The first stamps used in the new colony were stamps of Upper Senegal and Niger overprinted TERRITOIRE DU NIGER in 1921. The same stamps were surcharged in 1922.

From 1926, stamps marked prominently NIGER and in smaller letters AFRIQUE OCCIDENTALE FRANCAISE were issued.

== 1944 to 1959 ==
In these years, Niger used the stamps of French West Africa.

== Since independence ==
The first stamps of Niger as an autonomous republic were issued in 1959 and are marked Republique du Niger. Niger acquired full independence on 3 August 1960.

Stamps up to the 1970s tended to be large engraved issues similar to other former French colonies, including stamps featuring famous paintings like those of France. Later, more cheaply produced stamps were issued but designs continue to be large pictorials, typically of local relevance with some issues designed to appeal internationally to thematic stamp collectors.

Niger does not appear to distinguish between commemorative and definitive stamps, and unlike many African countries, has not issued cheaply produced definitive stamps for domestic mail use. A series of 14 small official stamps were issued in 1962 and a replacement set in 1988. Several series of postage due stamps have also been issued.

== Illegal stamps ==
A number of stamps have been issued which purport to be from Niger but which are believed to be illegal issues.

== See also ==
Media related to Postage stamps of Niger at Wikimedia Commons

- Niger Poste
- Postage stamps and postal history of Upper Senegal and Niger
- Postage stamps and postal history of French West Africa
