= Postage stamps and postal history of Ivory Coast =

Côte d'Ivoire, or the Ivory Coast, is a country in West Africa established as a French colony in 1893, and becoming independent in 1960.

== First posts ==
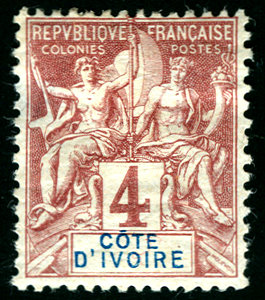
An 1892 4c stamp for Côte d'Ivoire of the Navigation and Commerce key type series

The French established trading posts during several time periods, but the first post office, at San Pédro, dates from 1847, with Grand Bassam, Jacqueville, and Assinie getting offices in 1890.

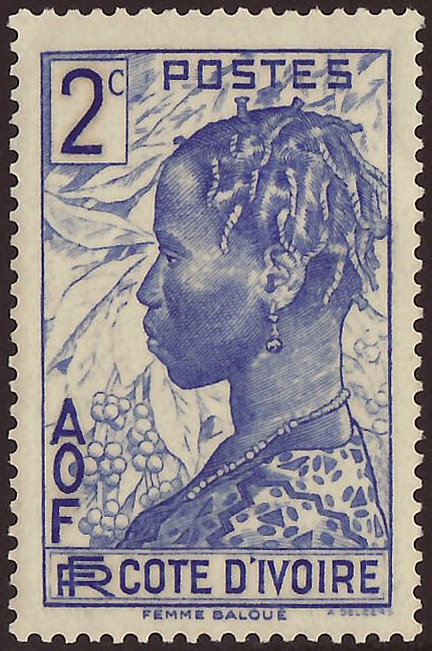
1936 stamp of Côte d'Ivoire showing of a Baoulé woman and coffee branches

== First stamps used ==
The first use of postage stamps was at Assinie from 1862, where the French Colonies general issues were available. The cancellation was an "ASI" in a lozenge of dots.

== First stamps of the colony ==
The colony received its own stamps in November 1892, just a few months prior to formal establishment. As typical for French colonies of the time, these were of the Navigation and Commerce design, with 13 values ranging from 1 centime to 1 franc. Four of the values were reissued with color changes in 1900, and several were surcharged in 1904 and again in 1912.

== Twentieth century ==
The colony participated in the West Africa commemorative stamp of 1906, and in 1913 an issue of stamps depicting a river scene started a long series that continued in use until the mid-1930s.

In the meantime, post offices multiplied, with 38 in existence throughout the territory by 1915.

When Upper Volta was dissolved in 1933, several of its provinces were added to Côte d'Ivoire, and 16 types of its stamps were overprinted "Côte d'Ivoire".

Stamps of French West Africa superseded Ivoirean stamps from 1944 to 1959.

On 1 October 1959, the first issue of the new republic went on sale. The three values depicted an elephant, and were inscribed "République de Côte d'Ivoire". A stamp in December depicted the country's first president, Félix Houphouët-Boigny. The first definitive series of the republic, in 1960, depicted masks from various tribes.

== References and sources ==
Sources

- Scott catalogue
