= Swimming at the 2020 Summer Olympics – Men's 100 metre breaststroke =

Men's 100 metre breaststroke at the Games of the XXXII Olympiad
- Venue: Tokyo Aquatics Centre
- Dates: 24 July 2021 (heats); 25 July 2021 (semifinals); 26 July 2021 (final)
- Competitors: 49 from 38 nations
- Winning time: 57.37

Medalists
1st place, gold medalist(s)		Adam Peaty	Great Britain
2nd place, silver medalist(s)		Arno Kamminga	Netherlands
3rd place, bronze medalist(s)		Nicolò Martinenghi	Italy

The men's 100 metre breaststroke event at the 2020 Summer Olympics was held from 24 to 26 July 2021 at the Tokyo Aquatics Centre. It was the event's fourteenth consecutive appearance, having been held at every edition since 1968.

== Summary ==
Great Britain's Adam Peaty defeated the field to become the country's first swimmer to claim back to back Olympic titles, and the second in this event after Japan's Kosuke Kitajima (2004-08). He jumped to an immediate lead, and never looked back, charging ahead of the field with his trademark high stroke rate to win gold in 57.37 - the fifth-fastest time in the history. The Netherlands' Arno Kamminga, the only other man in history to break the 58 seconds barrier, could not replicate his Dutch record from the heats and claimed silver in 58.00. Meanwhile, Italian Nicolò Martinenghi was only a shade off his national record time from the semi-finals, clocking a 58.33 to take bronze.

The U.S.' Michael Andrew was 7 tenths of a second shy of his American record set at the 2020 United States Olympic swimming trials, falling to fourth place in 58.84. Peaty's compatriot James Wilby (58.96) came fifth, while the U.S.' Andrew Wilson and China's Yan Zibei tied for sixth three one-hundredths behind in 58.99. Belarus' Ilya Shymanovich (59.36) was unable to break 59 seconds, rounding out the field in eighth.

The medals for the competition were presented by the United Kingdom's Sir Craig Reedie, IOC member, and the gifts were presented by Morocco's Zouheir El Moufti, FINA Bureau Member.

== Records ==
Prior to this competition, the existing world and Olympic records were as follows.

World record	Adam Peaty (GBR)	56.88	Gwangju, South Korea	21 July 2019
Olympic record	Adam Peaty (GBR)	57.13	Rio de Janeiro, Brazil	7 August 2016

No new records were set during the competition.

== Qualification ==
The Olympic Qualifying Time for the event is 59.93 seconds. Up to two swimmers per National Olympic Committee (NOC) can automatically qualify by swimming that time at an approved qualification event. The Olympic Selection Time is 1:01.73. Up to one swimmer per NOC meeting that time is eligible for selection, allocated by world ranking until the maximum quota for all swimming events is reached. NOCs without a male swimmer qualified in any event can also use their universality place.

== Competition format ==
The competition consists of three rounds: heats, semifinals, and a final. The swimmers with the best 16 times in the heats advance to the semifinals. The swimmers with the best 8 times in the semifinals advance to the final. Swim-offs are used as necessary to break ties for advancement to the next round.

== Schedule ==
All times are Japan Standard Time (UTC+9)

Date	Time	Round
24 July	20:25	Heats
25 July	11:33	Semifinals
26 July	11:12	Final

== Results ==
=== Heats ===
The swimmers with the top 16 times, regardless of heat, advanced to the semifinals.

Rank	Heat	Lane	Swimmer	Nation	Time	Notes
1	7	4	Adam Peaty	Great Britain	57.56	Q
2	6	4	Arno Kamminga	Netherlands	57.80	Q, NR
3	5	4	Michael Andrew	United States	58.62	Q
4	7	5	Nicolò Martinenghi	Italy	58.68	Q
5	7	3	Yan Zibei	China	58.75	Q
6	5	5	James Wilby	Great Britain	58.99	Q
7	6	3	Andrew Wilson	United States	59.03	Q
8	7	8	Felipe Lima	Brazil	59.17	Q
9	6	5	Ilya Shymanovich	Belarus	59.33	Q
9	7	1	Federico Poggio	Italy	59.33	Q
11	5	1	Lucas Matzerath	Germany	59.40	Q
11	6	8	Ryuya Mura	Japan	59.40	Q
13	5	7	Andrius Šidlauskas	Lithuania	59.46	Q
14	6	6	Fabian Schwingenschlögl	Germany	59.49	Q
15	5	3	Anton Chupkov	ROC	59.55	Q
16	7	2	Kirill Prigoda	ROC	59.68	Q
17	5	6	Dmitriy Balandin	Kazakhstan	59.75	
18	6	7	Berkay Ömer Öğretir	Turkey	59.82	
19	7	6	Emre Sakçı	Turkey	59.87	
20	4	5	Cho Sung-jae	South Korea	59.99	
21	3	5	Matti Mattsson	Finland	1:00.02	
22	6	2	Matthew Wilson	Australia	1:00.03	
23	7	7	Shoma Sato	Japan	1:00.04	
24	4	3	Zac Stubblety-Cook	Australia	1:00.05	
25	5	8	Caspar Corbeau	Netherlands	1:00.13	
26	6	1	Čaba Silađi	Serbia	1:00.19	
27	4	1	Denis Petrashov	Kyrgyzstan	1:00.23	
28	2	4	Jérémy Desplanches	Switzerland	1:00.29	NR
29	4	2	Darragh Greene	Ireland	1:00.30	
30	3	4	Bernhard Reitshammer	Austria	1:00.41	
31	3	7	Jorge Murillo	Colombia	1:00.62	
32	3	2	Lyubomir Epitropov	Bulgaria	1:00.71	
33	4	7	Théo Bussière	France	1:00.75	
34	4	6	Caio Pumputis	Brazil	1:00.76	
35	3	6	André Grindheim	Norway	1:00.86	
36	4	8	Giedrius Titenis	Lithuania	1:00.92	
37	4	4	Michael Houlie	South Africa	1:01.22	
38	3	3	Gabe Mastromatteo	Canada	1:01.56	
39	3	1	Josué Domínguez	Dominican Republic	1:01.86	
40	3	8	Izaak Bastian	Bahamas	1:01.87	
41	2	6	Amro Al-Wir	Jordan	1:02.17	NR
42	2	3	Adriel Sanes	Virgin Islands	1:02.43	
43	2	5	Julio Horrego	Honduras	1:02.45	
44	2	2	Sebastien Kouma	Mali	1:02.84	NR
45	2	7	Abobakr Abass	Sudan	1:04.46	
46	1	4	Micah Masei	American Samoa	1:04.93	
47	1	3	Muhammad Isa Ahmad	Brunei	1:08.65	
	1	5	Amini Fonua	Tonga	DSQ	
	5	2	Tobias Bjerg	Denmark	DSQ	

=== Semifinals ===
The swimmers with the best 8 times, regardless of heat, advanced to the final.

Rank	Heat	Lane	Swimmer	Nation	Time	Notes
1	2	4	Adam Peaty	Great Britain	57.63	Q
2	1	4	Arno Kamminga	Netherlands	58.19	Q
3	1	5	Nicolò Martinenghi	Italy	58.28	Q, NR
4	2	3	Yan Zibei	China	58.72	Q
5	2	5	Michael Andrew	United States	58.99	Q
6	1	3	James Wilby	Great Britain	59.00	Q
7	2	2	Ilya Shymanovich	Belarus	59.08	Q
8	2	6	Andrew Wilson	United States	59.18	Q
9	2	7	Lucas Matzerath	Germany	59.31	
10	1	1	Fabian Schwingenschlögl	Germany	59.32	
11	1	8	Kirill Prigoda	ROC	59.44	
12	1	6	Felipe Lima	Brazil	59.80	
13	1	7	Ryuya Mura	Japan	59.82	
13	2	1	Andrius Šidlauskas	Lithuania	59.82	
15	1	2	Federico Poggio	Italy	59.91	
16	2	8	Anton Chupkov	ROC	59.93	

=== Final ===
Rank	Lane	Swimmer	Nation	Time	Notes
1st place, gold medalist(s)	4	Adam Peaty	Great Britain	57.37	
2nd place, silver medalist(s)	5	Arno Kamminga	Netherlands	58.00	
3rd place, bronze medalist(s)	3	Nicolò Martinenghi	Italy	58.33	
4	2	Michael Andrew	United States	58.84	
5	7	James Wilby	Great Britain	58.96	
6	6	Yan Zibei	China	58.99	
6	8	Andrew Wilson	United States	58.99	
8	1	Ilya Shymanovich	Belarus	59.36	
