= Bouli Kakasi =

Nigerien singer (born 1937)

- Born: January 1, 1937 (age 88); Gothèye
- Occupation: Singer

Bouli Kakasi (sometimes Kakassi) (born 1937) is a Nigerien singer.

Born in Gothèye, Kakasi was noted for her performances in the zaley genre. She was a particular favorite of Aissa Diori, about whom she would sing songs of praise during her tenure as first lady. In latter years she has fallen from favor and into extreme poverty. Her career, along with that of Hama Dabgue, has been described as "emblematic of the decline of traditional Nigerien music".
