= Mali at the 2013 World Aquatics Championships =

- Flag of Mali
- FINA code: MLI
- National federation: Federation Malienne de Natation

in Barcelona, Spain
- Competitors: 3 in 1 sports
- Medals: Gold 0 Silver 0 Bronze 0 Total 0

World Aquatics Championships appearances
- 1973; 1975; 1978; 1982; 1986; 1991; 1994; 1998; 2001; 2003; 2005; 2007; 2009; 2011; 2013; 2015; 2017; 2019; 2022; 2023; 2024

Mali competed at the 2013 World Aquatics Championships in Barcelona, Spain from 19 July to 4 August 2013.

== Swimming ==
Malian swimmers achieved qualifying standards in the following events (up to a maximum of 2 swimmers in each event at the A-standard entry time, and 1 at the B-standard):

Men

Athlete	Event	Heat		Semifinal		Final	
Athlete	Event	Time	Rank	Time	Rank	Time	Rank
Boubou Togo	50 m freestyle	31.78	104	did not advance			
Boubou Togo	50 m breaststroke	DSQ		did not advance			
Oumar Toure	50 m butterfly	26.09	54	did not advance			
Oumar Toure	100 m butterfly	59.86	53	did not advance			

Women

Athlete	Event	Heat		Semifinal		Final	
Athlete	Event	Time	Rank	Time	Rank	Time	Rank
Haoua Sangare	50 m freestyle	34.49	79	did not advance			
Haoua Sangare	50 m breaststroke	49.68	73	did not advance			
