= Mali at the 2015 World Aquatics Championships =

- Flag of Mali
- FINA code: MLI
- National federation: Federation Malienne de Natation

in Kazan, Russia
- Competitors: 3 in 1 sport
- Medals: Gold 0 Silver 0 Bronze 0 Total 0

World Aquatics Championships appearances
- 1973; 1975; 1978; 1982; 1986; 1991; 1994; 1998; 2001; 2003; 2005; 2007; 2009; 2011; 2013; 2015; 2017; 2019; 2022; 2023; 2024

Mali competed at the 2015 World Aquatics Championships in Kazan, Russia from 24 July to 9 August 2015.

== Swimming ==
Malian swimmers have achieved qualifying standards in the following events (up to a maximum of 2 swimmers in each event at the A-standard entry time, and 1 at the B-standard):

Men

Athlete	Event	Heat		Semifinal		Final	
Athlete	Event	Time	Rank	Time	Rank	Time	Rank
Mamadou Soumaré	50 m freestyle	26.41	85	did not advance			
Mamadou Soumaré	100 m freestyle	59.33	103	did not advance			
Oumar Touré	50 m butterfly	26.13	53	did not advance			
Oumar Touré	100 m butterfly	58.00	61	did not advance			

Women

Athlete	Event	Heat		Semifinal		Final	
Athlete	Event	Time	Rank	Time	Rank	Time	Rank
Fatoumata Samassékou	50 m freestyle	32.79	100	did not advance			
Fatoumata Samassékou	50 m butterfly	36.31	63	did not advance			
