= List of Malian records in swimming =

The Mali records in swimming are the fastest ever performances of swimmers from Mali, which are recognised and ratified by the Fédération Malienne de Natation.

All records were set in finals unless noted otherwise.

== Long Course (50 m) ==
=== Men ===
Event	Time		Name	Club	Date	Meet	Location	Ref
50 m freestyle	24.11	h	Sébastien Kouma	Alliance Dijon Natation	11 December 2020	French Championships	Saint-Raphaël, France	
100 m freestyle	52.70		Sébastien Kouma	Mali	6 March 2020	CANA Zone 2 Swimming Championships	Accra, Ghana	
200 m freestyle	1:55.81		Sébastien Kouma	Alliance Dijon Natation	16 February 2019	Meeting de Châlon-sur-Saône	Châlon-sur-Saône, France	
400 m freestyle	4:12.87		Sébastien Kouma	Alliance Dijon Natation Mali	11 June 2016	Championnat Régional d'été	Montceau-les-Mines, France	
800 m freestyle								
1500 m freestyle								
50m backstroke	27.40	h	Sébastien Kouma	Alliance Dijon Natation	19 December 2020	Championnat Régional Hiver	Chalon-sur-Saône, France	
100m backstroke	1:00.15		Sébastien Kouma	Alliance Dijon Natation	19 December 2020	Championnat Régional Hiver	Chalon-sur-Saône, France	
200m backstroke	2:14.55		Sébastien Kouma	Alliance Dijon Natation	11 June 2016	Championnat Régional d'été	Montceau-les-Mines, France	
50m breaststroke	28.59		Sébastien Kouma	Ligue Bourgogne-Franche Comte	19 January 2019	Challenge International de Genève	Geneva, Switzerland	
100m breaststroke	1:02.84	h	Sébastien Kouma	Mali	24 July 2021	Olympic Games	Tokyo, Japan	
200m breaststroke	2:25.05	h	Sébastien Kouma	Alliance Dijon Natation	23 March 2019	Meeting Open Méditerranéen FFN Golden Tour - Camille Muffat	Marseille, France	
50m butterfly	25.45		Oumar Touré	AS Monaco Natation	10 July 2016	Championnats de Nationale 2 d'été	Canet-en-Roussillon, France	
100m butterfly	57.01	h	Oumar Touré	AS Monaco Natation	30 April 2017	Meeting International (Golden Tour - Camille Muffat)	Amiens, France	
200m butterfly	2:13.41	h	Oumar Toure	CN Cannes	21 March 2014	Championnats de nationale 2 d'hiver	Saint-Raphaël, France	
200m individual medley	2:07.31		Sébastien Kouma	Mali	7 March 2020	CANA Zone 2 Swimming Championships	Accra, Ghana	
400m individual medley	4:54.07		Sébastien Kouma	Alliance Dijon Natation	12 June 2016	Championnat Régional d'été	Montceau-les-Mines, France	
4×100m freestyle relay								
4×200m freestyle relay								
4×100m medley relay								

Legend: # – Record awaiting ratification by Fédération Malienne de Natation; WR – World record; AF – African record; e – equalled existing record;
Records not set in finals: h – heat; sf – semifinal; r – relay 1st leg; rh – relay heat 1st leg; b – B final; † – en route to final mark; so – swim-off; tt – time trial

=== Women ===
Event	Time		Name	Club	Date	Meet	Location	Ref
50 m freestyle	32.79	h	Fatoumata Samassékou	Mali	9 August 2015	World Championships	Kazan, Russia	
100 m freestyle	1:15.84	sf	Fatoumata Samassekou	Mali	14 May 2017	Islamic Solidarity Games	Baku, Azerbaijan	
200 m freestyle								
400 m freestyle								
800 m freestyle								
1500 m freestyle								
50 m backstroke								
100 m backstroke								
200 m backstroke								
50m breaststroke	47.41	h	Aichata Konate	Mali	21 August 2019	African Games	Casablanca, Morocco	
100 m breaststroke								
200 m breaststroke								
50 m butterfly	36.31	h	Fatoumata Samassékou	Mali	7 August 2015	World Championships	Kazan, Russia	
100 m butterfly								
200 m butterfly								
200 m individual medley								
400 m individual medley								
4×100 m freestyle relay								
4×200 m freestyle relay								
4×100 m medley relay								

Legend: # – Record awaiting ratification by Fédération Malienne de Natation; WR – World record; AF – African record; e – equalled existing record;
Records not set in finals: h – heat; sf – semifinal; r – relay 1st leg; rh – relay heat 1st leg; b – B final; † – en route to final mark; so – swim-off; tt – time trial

== Short Course (25 m) ==
=== Men ===
Event	Time		Name	Club	Date	Meet	Location	Ref
50m freestyle	23.37	r	Sébastien Kouma	Mali	16 November 2019	World Inter Universities Championships	Pula, Croatia	
100m freestyle	51.75	r	Sébastien Kouma	Alliance Dijon Natation	11 November 2017	Championnats Interclubs Régionaux	Auxerre, France	
200m freestyle	1:54.62	r	Sébastien Kouma	Alliance Dijon Natation	12 November 2017	Championnats Interclubs Régionaux	Auxerre, France	
400m freestyle	3:58.18		Sébastien Kouma	Alliance Dijon Natation	1 December 2019	Championnat Départemental - District Centre	Dijon, France	
800m freestyle								
1500m freestyle								
50m backstroke	26.99	h	Sébastien Kouma	Mali	8 December 2016	World Championships	Windsor, Canada	
100m backstroke	57.92		Sébastien Kouma	Alliance Dijon Natation	30 November 2019	Championnat Départemental - District Centre	Dijon, France	
200m backstroke	2:12.01		Sébastien Kouma	Alliance Dijon Natation	19 November 2016	Championnat Départemental d'hiver	Beaune, France	
50m breaststroke	27.54		Sébastien Kouma	Alliance Dijon Natation	15 December 2019	French Championships	Angers, France	
100m breaststroke	1:00.90	c	Sébastien Kouma	Alliance Dijon Natation	14 December 2019	French Championships	Angers, France	
200m breaststroke	2:15.94		Sébastien Kouma	Alliance Dijon Natation	10 November 2019	Championnats Régionaux Interclubs	Lons-le-Saunier, France	
50m butterfly	25.19		Oumar Toure	ASPTT Marseille	19 December 2015	Championnats de Nationale 2	Istres, France	
100m butterfly	56.47		Oumar Toure	ASPTT Marseille	8 November 2015	Championnat Régional Interclubs TC	Istres, France	
200m butterfly	2:07.81		Sébastien Kouma	Alliance Dijon Natation	3 December 2016	Championnats régionaux	Sochaux, France	
100m individual medley	55.05	c	Sébastien Kouma	Alliance Dijon Natation	12 December 2019	French Championships	Angers, France	
200m individual medley	2:02.76	h	Sébastien Kouma	Mali	15 November 2019	World Inter Universities Championships	Pula, Croatia	
400m individual medley	4:29.00		Sébastien Kouma	Alliance Dijon Natation	1 December 2019	Championnat Départemental - District Centre	Dijon, France	
4×50m freestyle relay								
4×100m freestyle relay								
4×200m freestyle relay								
4×50m medley relay								
4×100m medley relay								

Legend: # – Record awaiting ratification by Fédération Malienne de Natation; WR – World record; AF – African record; e – equalled existing record;
Records not set in finals: h – heat; sf – semifinal; r – relay 1st leg; rh – relay heat 1st leg; b – B final; † – en route to final mark; so – swim-off; tt – time trial

=== Women ===
Event	Time		Name	Club	Date	Meet	Location	Ref
50 m freestyle	32.80	h	Fatoumata Samassekou	Mali	12 December 2012	World Championships	Istanbul, Turkey	
100 m freestyle	1:13.64	h	Fatoumata Samassekou	Mali	13 December 2012	World Championships	Istanbul, Turkey	
200 m freestyle								
400 m freestyle								
800 m freestyle								
1500 m freestyle								
50 m backstroke								
100 m backstroke								
200 m backstroke								
50 m breaststroke	47.77	h	Ramata Coulibaly	Mali	3 December 2014	World Championships	Doha, Qatar	
100 m breaststroke								
200 m breaststroke								
50 m butterfly								
100 m butterfly								
200 m butterfly								
100 m individual medley								
200 m individual medley								
400 m individual medley								
4×50 m freestyle relay								
4×100 m freestyle relay								
4×200 m freestyle relay								
4×50 m medley relay								
4×100 m medley relay								

Legend: # – Record awaiting ratification by Fédération Malienne de Natation; WR – World record; AF – African record; e – equalled existing record;
Records not set in finals: h – heat; sf – semifinal; r – relay 1st leg; rh – relay heat 1st leg; b – B final; † – en route to final mark; so – swim-off; tt – time trial
