= Mali at the 2011 World Aquatics Championships =

- Flag of Mali
- FINA code: MLI
- National federation: Federation Malienne de Natation

in Shanghai, China
- Competitors: 3 in 1 sports
- Medals: Gold 0 Silver 0 Bronze 0 Total 0

World Aquatics Championships appearances
- 1973; 1975; 1978; 1982; 1986; 1991; 1994; 1998; 2001; 2003; 2005; 2007; 2009; 2011; 2013; 2015; 2017; 2019; 2022; 2023; 2024

Mali competed at the 2011 World Aquatics Championships in Shanghai, China between July 16 and 31, 2011.

== Swimming ==
Mali qualified 3 swimmers.

Men

Athlete	Event	Heats		Semifinals		Final	
Athlete	Event	Time	Rank	Time	Rank	Time	Rank
Mamadou Soumare	Men's 50m Freestyle	26.05	74	did not advance			
Mamadou Soumare	Men's 100m Freestyle	58.21	85	did not advance			
Mamadou Soumare	Men's 50m Butterfly	30.64	52	did not advance			
Mamadou Fofana	Men's 50m Breaststroke	32.03	41	did not advance			
Mamadou Fofana	Men's 100m Breaststroke	1:16.86	78	did not advance			

Women

Athlete	Event	Heats		Semifinals		Final	
Athlete	Event	Time	Rank	Time	Rank	Time	Rank
Faleumata Samassekou	Women's 50m Freestyle	32.40	71	did not advance			
Faleumata Samassekou	Women's 50m Backstroke	37.79	55	did not advance			
