= Zaley =

Nigerien music genre

Zaley (sometimes zalay) is a musical genre of the Zarma and Songhay people of Niger. Most famous during the 1940s and 1950s, it is a genre dominated by female performers, who take as the subject of their songs the virtues of men whose qualities they appreciated. The word itself comes from the Zarma language, and denotes a blend of musical instruments with female voices; it has also come to mean "amorous seeking". Some writers have described the genre's significance as being similar to that of romanticism in nineteenth-century European culture.

Notable singers of zaley have included Haoua Issa, sometimes called "Haoua Zaley", and Bouli Kakasi.
