= Seydou Badian Kouyaté =

Malian writer and politician (1928–2018)

- Born: April 10, 1928; Bamako, French Sudan
- Died: December 28, 2018 (aged 90); Bamako, Mali
- Occupations: Writer, politician

Seydou Badian Kouyaté (April 10, 1928 – December 28, 2018) was a Malian writer and politician. He wrote the lyrics to the Malian national anthem, "Le Mali".

== Early life and education ==
Born in Bamako, Kouyaté studied medicine at the University of Montpellier in France before returning to Mali.

== Career ==
Under president Modibo Keïta, he wrote the words for Mali's national anthem, "Le Mali". In the Plan of September 17, 1962, he was named Minister of Economic and Financial Coordination. However, with the coup d'état of 1968, and the rise to the presidency of Moussa Traoré, Kouyaté was deported to Kidal before being exiled to Dakar, in Senegal. Associated from its beginning with the Sudanese Union-African Democratic Rally, he was removed from the party in 1998 for having opposed part of its plan to refuse recognition to certain institutions participating in contested elections.

Kouyaté is also internationally known as a writer; even before Mali's independence, in 1957, he had published his first novel, Sous l'orage. This was followed by two other novels, Le Sang des masques in 1976 and Noces sacrées in 1977. In 2007 his novel La Saison des pièges was published.

In March 2018, Seydou Badian was awarded the Grand Prix des Mécènes of the GPLA 2017, as a tribute to all his bibliographic career.

== Works ==
- 1957 : Sous l’orage
- 1962 : La Mort de Chaka
- 1965 : Les Dirigeants africains face à leurs peuples, Grand prix littéraire d'Afrique noire
- 1976 : Le Sang des masques
- 1977 : Noces sacrées
- 2007 : La Saison des pièges, Nouvelles éditions ivoiriennes and Présence africaine

== Awards ==
- Grand prix littéraire d'Afrique noire
- Grand Prix des Mécènes (GPLA 2017).
