= Mali at the 2019 World Aquatics Championships =

- Flag of Mali
- FINA code: MLI
- National federation: Fédération Malienne de Natation

in Gwangju, South Korea
- Competitors: 3 in 1 sport
- Medals: Gold 0 Silver 0 Bronze 0 Total 0

World Aquatics Championships appearances
- 1973; 1975; 1978; 1982; 1986; 1991; 1994; 1998; 2001; 2003; 2005; 2007; 2009; 2011; 2013; 2015; 2017; 2019; 2022; 2023; 2024

Mali competed at the 2019 World Aquatics Championships in Gwangju, South Korea from 12 to 28 July.

== Swimming ==
Mali entered three swimmers.

Men

Athlete	Event	Heat		Semifinal		Final	
Athlete	Event	Time	Rank	Time	Rank	Time	Rank
Sebastien Kouma	50 m breaststroke	29.27	54	did not advance			
Sebastien Kouma	100 m breaststroke	1:04.03	59	did not advance			
Ousmane Touré	50 m butterfly	27.67	74	did not advance			
Ousmane Touré	100 m butterfly	1:00.81	72	did not advance			

Women

Athlete	Event	Heat		Semifinal		Final	
Athlete	Event	Time	Rank	Time	Rank	Time	Rank
Aichata Konate	50 m breaststroke	49.20	53	did not advance			
