= Banzumana Sissoko =

Malian jeli and n'goni player (1890–1987)

Background information
- Born: 1890
- Origin: Mali
- Died: 1987 (aged 96–97)
- Genres: World
- Instrument: N'goni

Banzumana Sissoko (1890–1987) was a noted Malian Jeli and N'goni player.

== Biography ==
Banzumana was born blind in Segou. He was considered a major national figure in Mali; Cheick Mahamadou Chérif Keïta writes: "From the late 1950s, when Banzumana Sissoko became known on the national scene, to his death in 1987, the entire Mandenka nation was witness to his categorical refusal to curry favor with any politician or rich patron. It is interesting that in his immensely rich repertoire of both traditional and original songs, not a single one contains praises for a living person."

== Anecdotes ==
In his Maanland Mali (Moonscape Mali, 2002; collected into Nomad's Hotel: Travels in Time and Space), the Dutch writer and traveller Cees Nooteboom reports that, at daybreak on November 19, 1968, all small radio transmitters, which had been silent overnight, started playing Banzumana's melodies. He had been banned by the President of Mali Modibo Keita's regime up to that night, as the lyrics of his songs said that all rulers would have been killed. Modibo Keita would be overthrown in a coup d'état on that day. Nooteboom also reports the legend according to which Banzumana's instrument was able to fly, and played alone, when his master was sleeping.

== Discography ==
In 1962 "A ton appel Mali", one of his compositions, became the national anthem of Mali; the text is by Seydou Badian Kouyaté.
