= Senegambia and Niger =

French colony in West Africa (1902-04)

Coordinates: 17°41′33.7″N 8°4′5.9″E

Senegambia and Niger Sénégambie et Niger (French) السنغامبيا والنيجر (Arabic) Al-singhambia walnayjar
- 1902–1904
- Flag

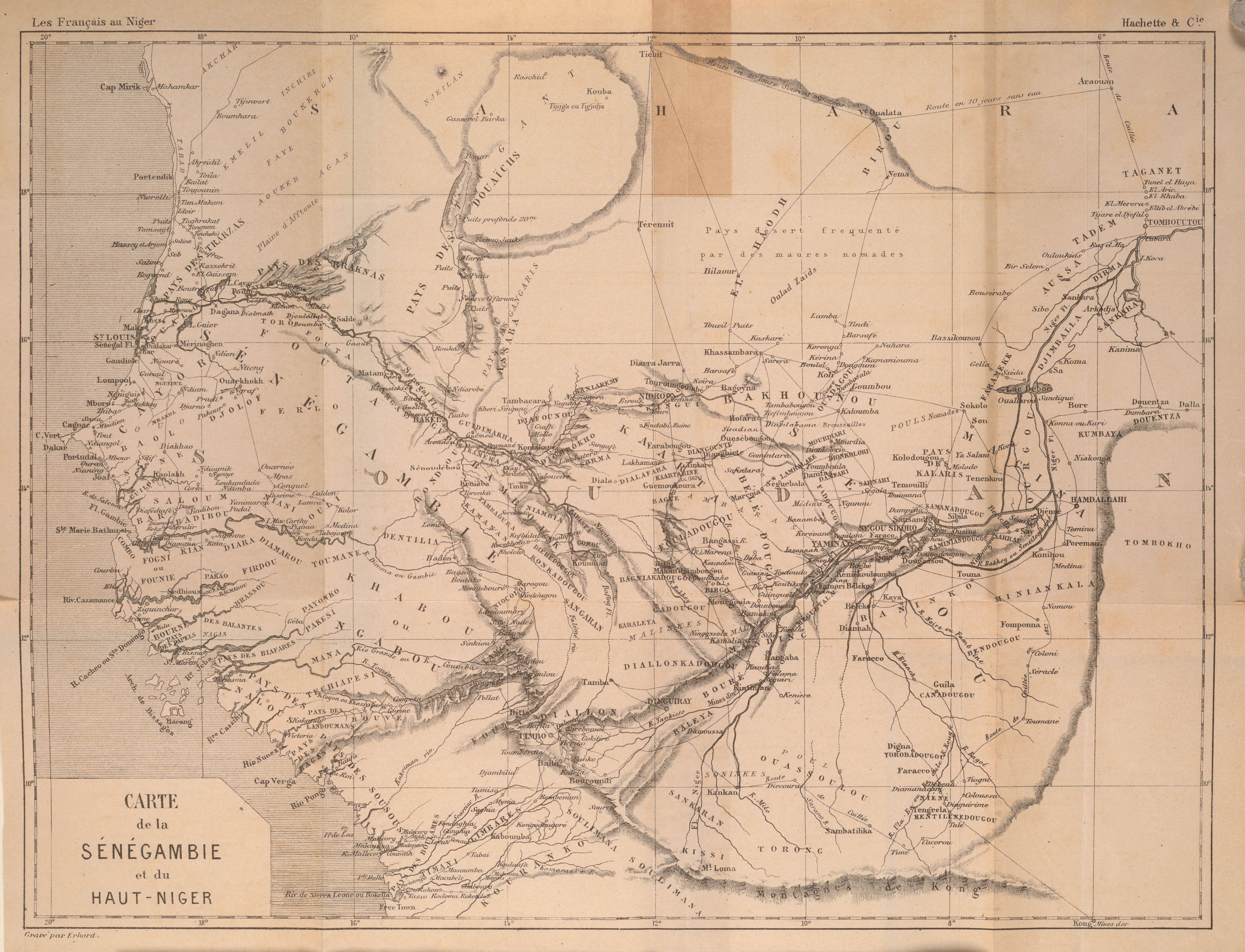
- Status: French colony
- Common languages: French
- History
  - Established: 1902
  - Disestablished: 1904
- Currency: French West African franc
Preceded by	Succeeded by
French Sudan	Upper Senegal and Niger

Senegambia and Niger was a short-lived administrative unit of the colonial French West Africa possessions, in the region of present-day Niger, Mali and Senegal.

It was formed in 1902, and reorganized in 1904 into Upper Senegal and Niger.

== Stamps ==
Despite its brief existence, the French government still managed to issue postage stamps for the administrative unit, in the form of a version of its Navigation and Commerce series, inscribed "SENEGAMBIE / ET NIGER".

== See also ==
- French West Africa topics
- French colonisation in Africa
- Sénégambia Confederation
