= Emblem of Mali =

- Armiger: Republic of Mali
- Adopted: 20 October 1973
- Shield: A light blue background: in the middle, the mosque of Djenné, in gold colour; above the mosque, a vulture in gliding flight, in gold colour; below, the rising sun, in gold colour; in front of the sun, two opposed bows bent by their arrow, in white colour; in the surround, the name of a country in French, "Republic of Mali" above and the National Motto below, in black capital letters.
- Motto: Un Peuple, Un But, Une Foi "One People, One Goal, One Faith"

The emblem of Mali is a national emblem consisting of a circle charged with a bird at the top, a mosque in the centre flanked by two bows and arrows, and the rising sun at the bottom. Adopted thirteen years after the country gained independence, it has been the seal of the Republic of Mali since 1973. It is utilized on official documents as a coat of arms.

== History ==
Seal of Mali from 1961 to 1973.

Mali gained independence in August 1960, when it separated from Senegal and became an independent country on its own, thus dissolving the short-lived Mali Federation that had unified the two nations. A seal for Mali was designed soon afterwards, which is almost identical to the current seal save for the colour scheme. It featured a red circle surrounded by a green border. The current seal was officially adopted 20 October 1973, under Ordinance no. 56 of the CMLN (Military Committee for National Liberation). It is utilized on official documents in place of a coat of arms, a heraldic device that the country has never adopted.

== Design ==
=== Symbolism ===
The colours and objects on the seal carry cultural, political, and regional meanings. The mosque depicted at the centre of the seal is the Great Mosque of Djenné. It represents Islam, the country's majority religion—practised by 94.8% of the population. Featured above the structure is a bird – the species it belongs to is disputed. Although the 1973 ordinance gives the description that it is a "legendary vulture" originating from Malian folklore, other sources claim it is actually a dove that symbolizes peace. The Djenné mosque is flanked by two bows and arrows, with the rising sun pictured at the very bottom.

=== Similarities ===
The country's motto—"One People, One Goal, One Faith" (French: Un Peuple, Un But, Une Foi)—is exactly the same as Senegal's. It is featured on that country's coat of arms as well.

== Gallery ==
Coat of arms of the Mali Federation (1959-1960)

Coat of arms of the Malian Armed Forces

== See also ==
- Flag of Mali
