= Upper Senegal and Niger =

French colony in West Africa (1904-21)

Coordinates: 12.6458°N 7.9922°W

Colony of Upper Senegal and Niger Haut Sénégal et Niger (French)
- 1904–1921
- Flag

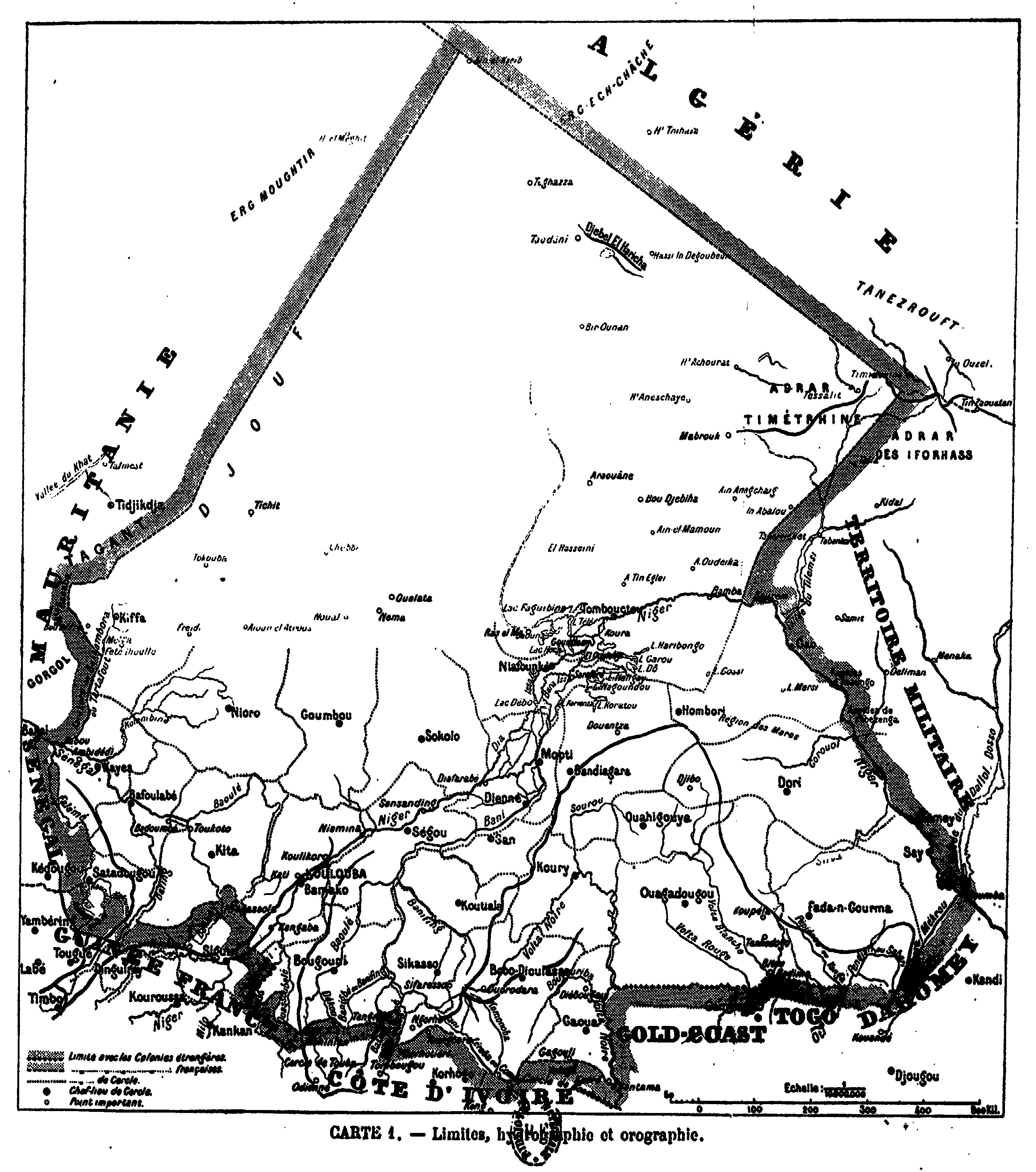
- A map of Upper Senegal and Niger circa 1912 from French colonial report
- Status: Colony in French West Africa
- Capital: Bamako
- Common languages: French
- History
  - Established: 1904
  - Disestablished: 1921

Area
  - Total: 780,000 km^{2} (300,000 sq mi)
- Currency: French West African franc
Preceded by
Senegambia and Niger
Succeeded by
French Upper Volta
French Sudan
Colony of Niger
- Today part of: Burkina Faso; Mali; Niger

Upper Senegal and Niger (French: Haut Sénégal et Niger) was a colony in French West Africa, created on 21 October 1904 from colonial Senegambia and Niger by the decree "For the Reorganisation of the general government of French West Africa". It was split into French Upper Volta and French Sudan in 1920 and 1921.

At its creation, the "Colony of Upper Senegal and Niger" contained the old territories of Upper Senegal, the Middle Niger, and three military territories in Niger. The colonial region covered 300,000 square miles (780,000 km^{2}) and the military region of Niger covered a further 50,000 square miles (130,000 km^{2}). Its capital was Bamako.

== History ==
French expeditions and colonization into the Middle Niger region by the French gained steam in the 1880s. Bamako was established as a French colonial post in 1883. A series of military expeditions led to French imperial control over the Imamate of Futa Jallon and treaties with other groups by the 1890s.

Further French colonial reorganization and taxation led to rebellions. Most notable were the Kobkitanda rebellion, led by the blind cleric Alfa Saibou, and the Karma revolt (December 1905–March 1906) of Oumarou Karma. The latter engulfed much of the Niger valley and was suppressed by four French columns arriving from Dori, Gao, Tahoua, and Zinder.

A decree of 2 March 1907 added the cercles of Fada N'gourma and Say, which had been part of the colony of French Dahomey (present-day Benin). On 1 January 1912, the military territory of Niger was split off from Upper Senegal and Niger, and was erected into a colony in 1922.

Between November 1915 and February 1917, the Colony of Upper Senegal and Niger witnessed vastly popular, temporarily successful, and sustained armed opposition to the colonial government in its western Volta region, which is referred to as the Volta-Bani War. It challenged colonial government authority for more than a year in an area stretching from Koudougou (in present-day Burkina Faso) in the east, to the banks of the Bani River (present-day Mali) in the west. This was the most significant armed opposition to colonial authority organized anywhere in sub-Saharan Africa in the period preceding World War II.

=== Division ===
After World War I ended, the unsuspected success of this resistance movement caused the French authorities to issue the decree "Concerning the Division of the Colony of Upper Senegal and Niger and the Creation of the Colony of Upper Volta" of 1 March 1919, which divided the colony into two distinct units:

- French Upper Volta, formed from the cercles of Gaoua, Bobo-Dioulasso, Dédougou, Ouagadougou, Dori, Say, and Fada N'Gourma;
- the remaining territory – present-day Mali – was still called "Upper Senegal and Niger" until it was renamed "French Sudan" on 1 January 1921, implementing the decree of 4 December 1920, "For the Denomination of the Colonies and Territories Composing the General Government of French West Africa."

== Geography ==
The precise boundaries of Upper Senegal and Niger changed over time, as a result of better mapping and international treaties. West to east, the territory spanned from 12 degrees west longitude to 12 degrees east longitude, approximately from the western edge of modern-day Mali to the Algeria-Niger-Libya tripoint. North to south, it spanned from 23 degrees north to 9° 20′ north latitude, approximately from the Algeria-Niger-Libya tripoint down to the southern edge of modern Burkina Faso. It contained most of the course of the Niger River, including the Inner Niger Delta and its great bend to the southeast.

== Stamps ==
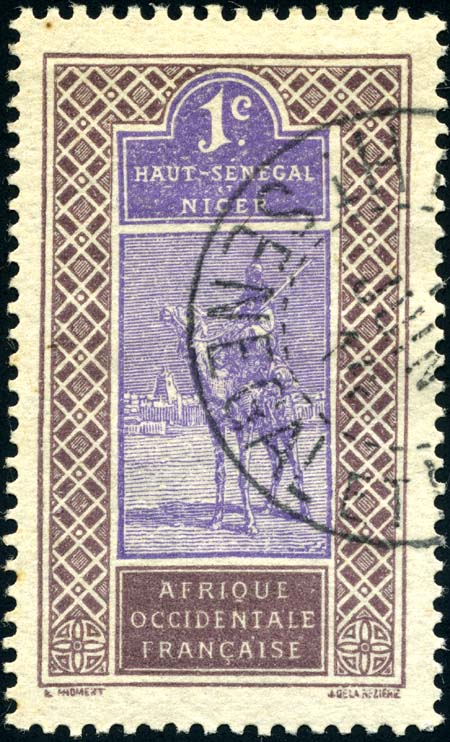
Camel and rider design on 1-centime stamp from 1914.

The colony of Upper Senegal and Niger is perhaps remembered most often by philatelists since it issued a number of postage stamps during its existence.

== See also ==
- French West Africa topics
- French Sudan topics
- French colonisation in Africa
