= Kanaga mask =

Dogon mask used by members of the Awa Society

The Kanaga mask is a mask of the Dogon of Mali traditionally worn by members of the male Awa Society during a ceremony called the dama. The dama is performed months or even years after a person has died, in order to send their soul to the world of the dead. The Kanaga mask is one of the most popular of the many types of masks used during a dama; in 1935, French anthropologist Marcel Griaule counted 29 out of 74 masks at one such ceremony as being of the Kanaga type.

== Description ==
The base wooden mask is worn on the face and is topped with a tall, two-barred cross, with the wooden crossbars being of equal length The lower of the two has its ends pointing down, while the upper has its ends pointing up. The entire mask can be over 3 feet (0.91 m) tall; the dimensions of one example are 43 1/16 × 24 3/8 × 6 15/16 inches (109.3 × 61.9 × 17.7 cm).

The shape of the mask may represent various animal subjects: the kommolo tebu (a bird), the lizard, the iguana, the barâmkamza dullogu (a water insect), the hand of God or the female spirit of the trees (gyinu ya). The mask is presented in male and female forms, the male version being the most numerous.

== Symbolism ==
The cross has two meanings. First, it represents the arms and legs of the creator god Amma. Second, it shows the arrangement of the universe, with the lower cross signifying the earth, and the upper the heavens or the sky.

== On flags ==
The Kanaga mask is represented on the flags of French Sudan (1892–1958), the ephemeral Republic of Sudan (1958–1959) and the short-lived Federation of Mali (1959–1960), which joined Senegal and the Sudanese Republic, formerly French Sudan.

== Gallery ==
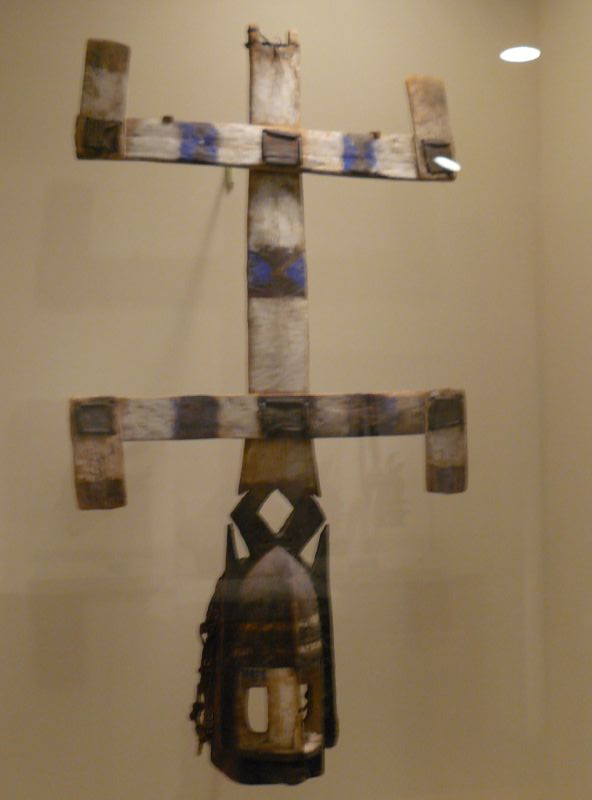

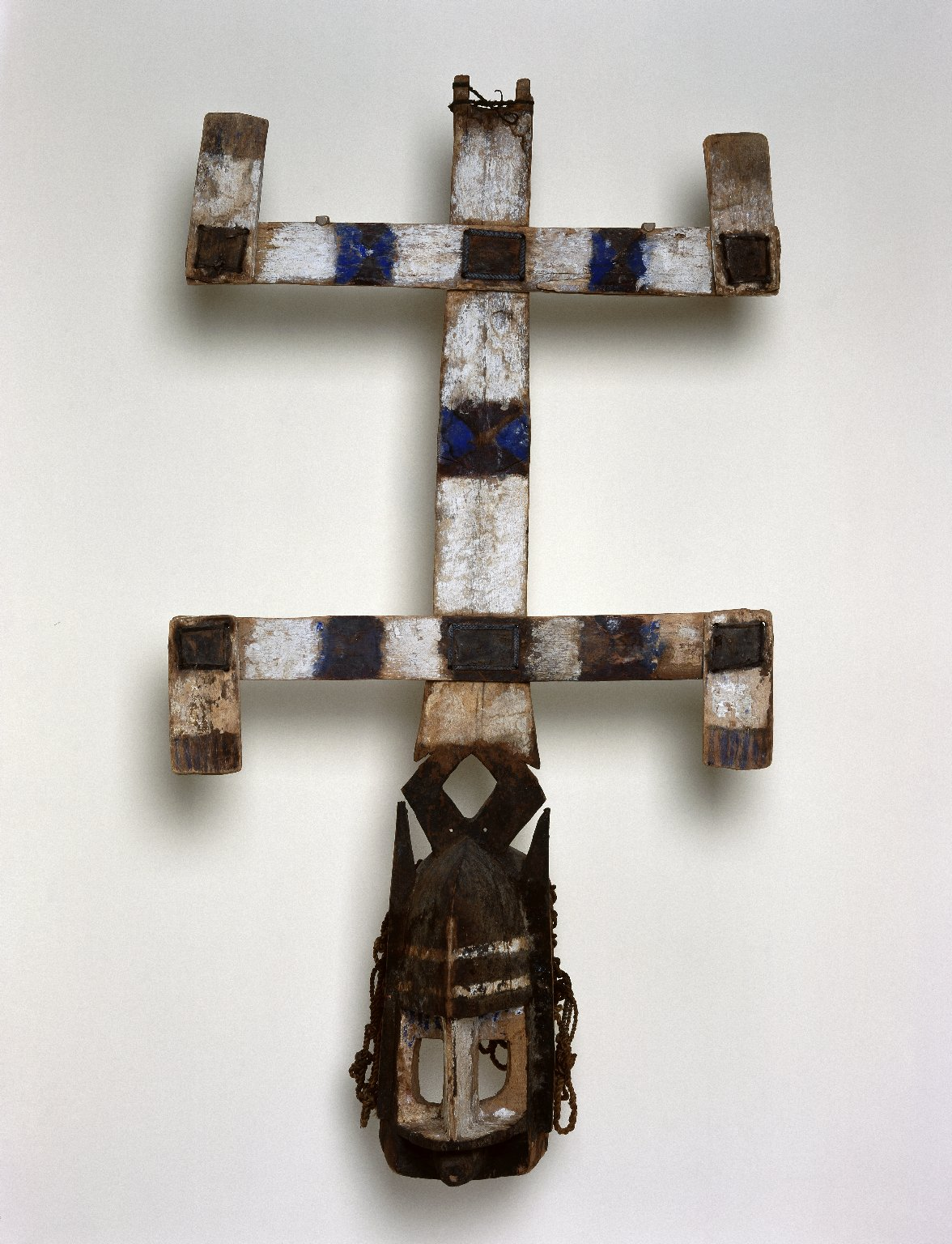

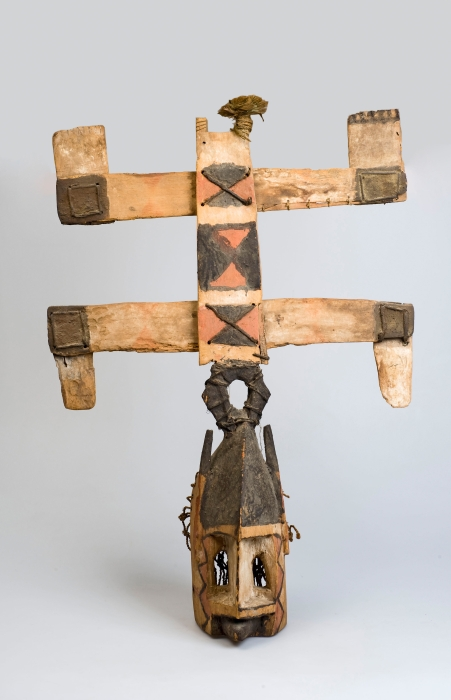

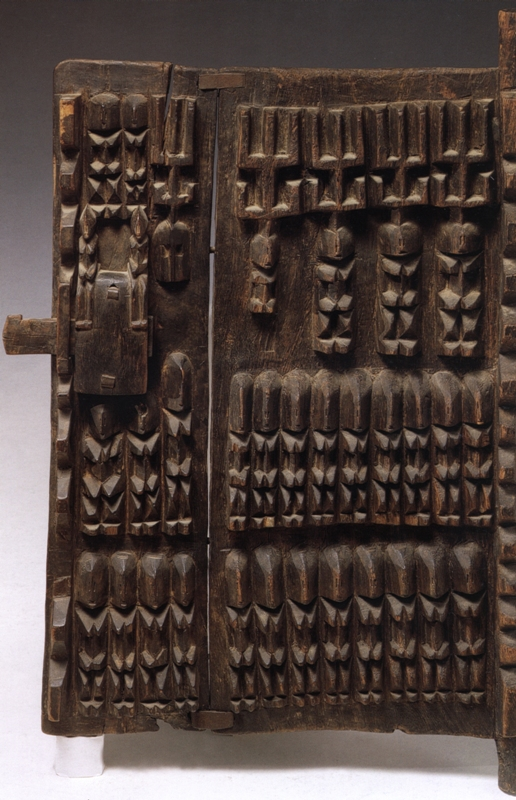

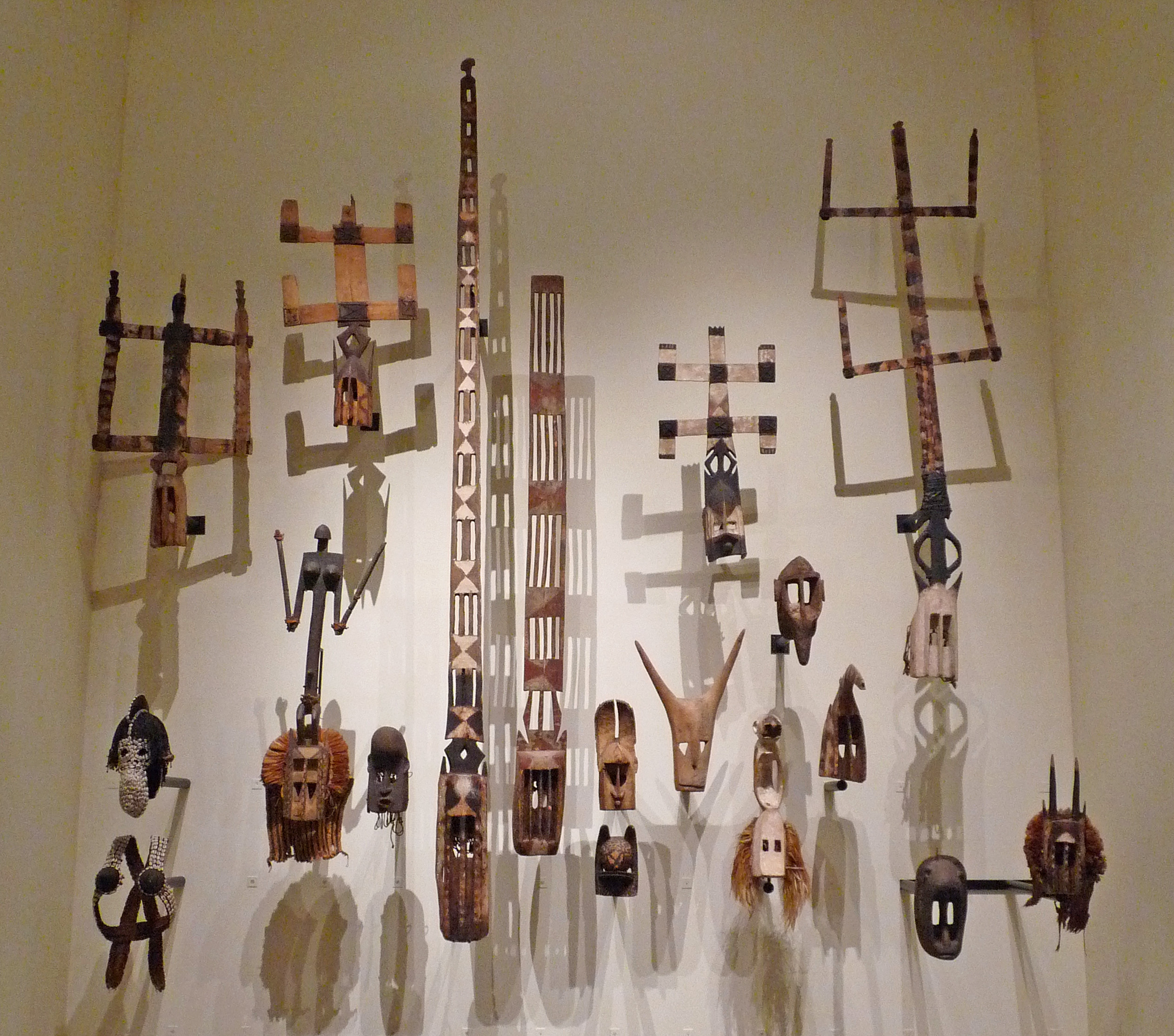

Flag of French Sudan

Flag of Mali Federation (1959-1961)

== Bibliography ==
- Marcel Griaule et Germaine Dieterlen, Le renard pâle : 1 Le Mythe cosmogonique, fasc. 1 La création du monde, Institut d'Ethnologie, Paris, 1991 (rééd.), p. 171-172
- Nadine Martinez, Écritures africaines: esthétique et fonction des écritures Dogon, Bamana et Sénoufo, L'Harmattan, Paris, 2010, 272 p. ISBN 9782296117341
- Famedji-Koto Tchimou, Langage de la danse chez les Dogons, L'Harmattan, Paris, 1995, 174 p. ISBN 9782296294660
