= French West African franc =

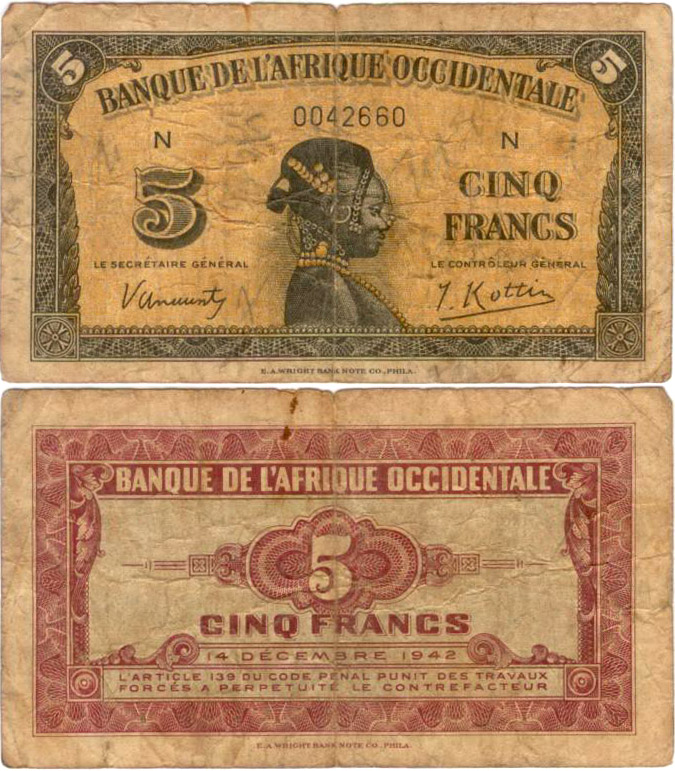
A 1943 5 French West African franc note

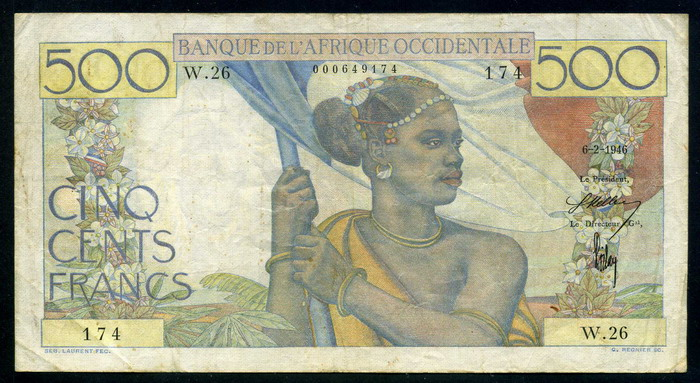
French West Africa 500 Francs banknote of 1946.

The franc was the currency of French West Africa. The French franc circulated, together with distinct banknotes from 1903 and coins from 1944. It was replaced by the CFA franc in 1945.

== Coins ==
In 1944, aluminium-bronze 50 centimes and 1 franc coins were issued. These were the only coins struck before the introduction of the CFA franc.

== Banknotes ==
The Banque de l'Afrique Occidentale began issuing notes in 1903. 100 franc notes were introduced that year, followed by 5 francs in 1904, 500 francs in 1912, 25 francs in 1917, 1000 francs in 1919 and 50 francs in 1920. 10 franc notes were introduced in 1943. In 1944, the government issued notes for 50 centimes, and 1 and 2 francs. The notes of the Banque de l'Afrique Occidentale continued to circulate after the introduction of the CFA franc.
