= Sébastien Kouma =

Malian swimmer

Personal information
- Nationality: MLI & FRA
- Born: 27 April 1997 (age 29) Dijon, France
- Height: 1.87 m (6 ft 2 in)

Sport
- Sport: Swimming
- Strokes: Breaststroke
- Club: Alliance Dijon Natation

Sébastien Kouma (born 27 April 1997) is a Malian swimmer who lives in France.

His speciality is Breaststroke.

== Sport career ==
In 2017, he competed in the men's 50 metre breaststroke event at the World Aquatics Championships. He has participated to all the International Competitions since December 2016 (World Championships, African Games, African Championships, Zone 2 African Championships) and more than 5 French National Championships.

He represented Mali at the 2019 World Aquatics Championships held in Gwangju, South Korea and he competed in the men's 50 metre breaststroke and men's 100 metre breaststroke events. He also represented Mali at the 2019 African Games held in Rabat, Morocco.

On the 24th of July 2021, he became an Olympic Athlete, competing in the Men's 100 metre breaststroke in the 2020 Summer Olympics. Even if he broke the national record in this race, 1.02.84 against 1.03.31, he finished 44th out 49 athletes and didn't qualify for the semi-finals.

He owns 12 National Records List of Malian records in swimming on 15 races in Long Course (50m).
