= French Sudan =

French colony in West Africa (1880–1960)

Coordinates: 12°39′N 8°0′W

French Sudan Soudan français
- Colony of French West Africa
- 1880–1960
- Flag (1958–1959)

- French Sudan French West Africa Other French possessions French Republic

Anthem
- La Marseillaise
- Capital: Bamako
- Area
  - 1959: 1,241,238 km^{2} (479,245 sq mi)
- Population
  - 1959: 4,407,000
- Historical era: New Imperialism
  - Established: c. 1880
  - Federated with Senegal: 1959
Preceded by
Wassoulou Empire
Toucouleur Empire
Kénédougou Kingdom
Mossi Kingdoms
Succeeded by
French West Africa
Mali Federation
- Today part of: Mali

French Sudan (French: Soudan français; Arabic: السودان الفرنسي as-Sūdān al-Faransī) was a French colonial territory in the Federation of French West Africa from around 1880 until 1959, when it joined the Mali Federation, and then in 1960, when it became the independent state of Mali. The colony was formally called French Sudan from 1890 until 1899 and then again from 1921 until 1958, and had a variety of different names over the course of its existence. The colony was initially established largely as a military project led by French troops, but in the mid-1890s it came under civilian administration.

A number of administrative reorganizations in the early 1900s brought increasing French administration over issues like agriculture, religion, and slavery. Following World War II, the African Democratic Rally (RDA) under Modibo Keïta became the most significant political force pushing for independence.

French Sudan initially retained close connections with France and joined in a short-lived federation with Senegal in 1959, but ties to both countries quickly weakened. In 1960, the French Sudan formally became the Republic of Mali and began to distance itself further from Senegal and France.

== Colonial establishment ==
French Sudan was formed as a set of military outposts as an extension of the French colony in Senegal. Though the area offered France little economic or strategic gain, the military effectively advocated greater conquest in the region. This was partly due to a fascination with the great empires, such as the Mali Empire and the Songhay Empire that rose to prominence in the area, and partly due to the promotional opportunities that military conquest offered for French military personnel.

French conquest began in 1879, when Joseph Gallieni was dispatched to the area to establish a fort and survey the land for a railroad from Dakar in Senegal to the Niger River. This was followed with the establishment of a number of French forts and political alliances with specific leaders in the region in the early 1880s. The administrative structure of the area was still largely under control of the French Governor of Senegal, and the most significant colonization were simply the military forts and outposts, including the important one established at Kayes in 1881 by Gustave Borgnis-Desbordes. Though the civilian administration of the French governor of Senegal formally ruled the area, military officers in the region largely bypassed these leaders and answered directly to commanding officers in Paris. Desbordes gradually took over more territory, often using inter-ethnic rivalries and political tension among leaders in the area to appoint French-supportive leaders.

French civilian administrators struggled with the military leaders, and the two forces went through a number of leadership changes over the territory, until Louis Archinard was appointed military governor in 1892. Archinard led military campaigns against Samori Ture, Ahmadu Tall, and other resistant leaders in the region, with varying success. Archinard's campaigns were often executed through direct military control, without civilian oversight. As costs increased, the French administration decided to replace Archinard's control over the area with a civilian governor, Louis Albert Grodet.

== Administration and jurisdiction ==
Map of French colonies in West Africa in 1928, French Sudan is labeled in orange

Names of colony
1880–1890	Upper River
1890–1899	French Sudan
1899–1902	Divided into two administrative districts: Middle Niger and Upper Senegal
1902–1904	Senegambia and Niger
1904–1921	Upper Senegal and Niger
1921–1958	French Sudan
1958–1960	Sudanese Republic
1960	Independent as Mali Federation (June–September), Republic of Mali (after 22 September)

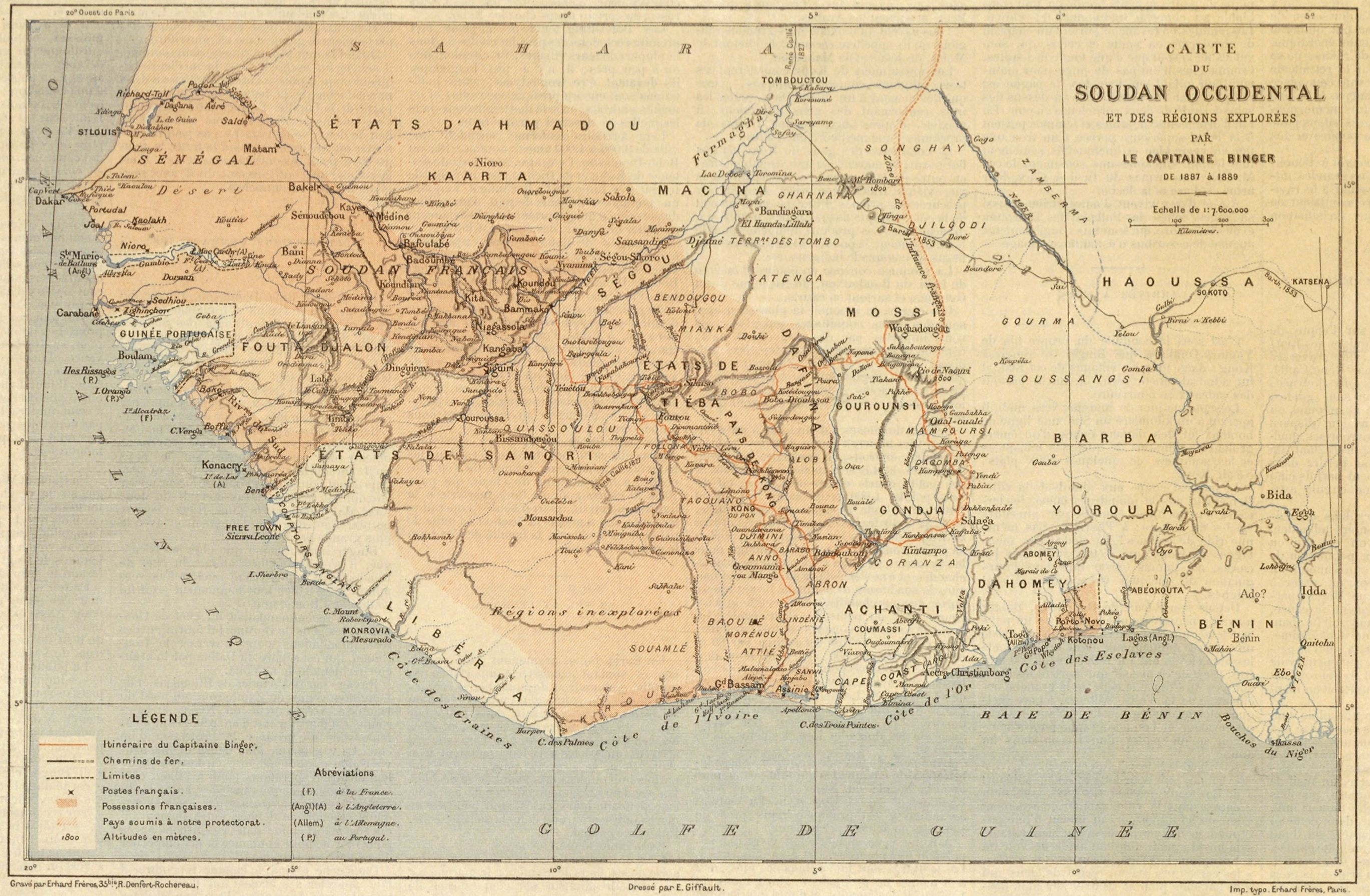
Map of French colonies in West Africa in 1889

The region was governed under a number of different names between 1880 and 1960. The area was Upper River from 1880 until 18 August 1890, when it was renamed French Sudan, with its capital at Kayes. On 10 October 1899, French Sudan was divided, with the southern cercles joining coastal colonies, and the rest split into two administrative areas called Middle Niger and Upper Senegal. In 1902, the region again was organized as a unified colony under the name Senegambia and Niger (Sénégambie et Niger). The name changed again in 1904 to Upper Senegal and Niger (Haut Sénégal et Niger). Finally, in 1921, the name changed back to French Sudan (Soudan Français).

Borders and administration of the colony similarly changed a number of times. Originally, and for the initial period, the colony vacillated between military administration and civilian administration from Senegal. In 1893, French Sudan formally came under civilian administration, which lasted until 1899. At that point, a reorganization of the colony split 11 southern provinces to other French colonies like French Guinea, the Ivory Coast and Dahomey.

The area that was not reorganized was governed in two administrations linked to other French colonies. Following this, the territory of the colony was reestablished in 1902. Though the borders shifted slightly, there was little territorial change until 1933. At that point, the colony of the French Upper Volta (Haute-Volta, modern Burkina Faso) dissolved, and the northern territory was added to French Sudan.

In 1947, Upper Volta was reestablished, and the French Sudan borders became those that eventually became the borders of Mali. Kayes was the original capital city from the 1890s until 1908 when the capital moved to Bamako, where it remains.

== Agriculture ==
The colony supported mostly rain-fed agriculture, with limited irrigation for its first 30 years. The only cash crops were nuts gathered close to the railroad between Kayes and Bamako. However, following successful tests of growing Egyptian cotton in West Africa during World War I, Émile Bélime began to campaign for the construction of a large irrigation system along the Niger River. Starting in 1921, significant irrigation projects around Koulikoro and later at Baguinéda-Camp and the Ségou Cercle began to bring water. The French believed this project could rival the major cotton growing centers of Egypt and the United States.

Unlike other agricultural projects in French West Africa, the French Sudan irrigation project initially relied on families voluntarily resettling along lines established by the colonial authority. Unable to attract enough volunteers, the colonial authorities began to try forced resettlement to the cotton project. The Office du Niger was founded in 1926 as the main organization facilitating planned, irrigated agricultural projects. Farmers resisted forced resettlement and petitioned for permanent land rights to the irrigated land (which was usually held as property of the Office du Niger). Despite these efforts, a significant cash crop economy did not develop in the French Sudan.

== Religious policy ==
Like much of the rest of French West Africa, the colony had a number of policies regarding Islam and the Muslim communities. The Arabic language and Islamic law were preferred in the colony by the French in the establishment of colonial government, largely because both were codified, and thus easy to standardize.

Though they maintained a formal neutrality policy in regard to religion, the French colonial administration began to regulate Islamic education in the early 1900s. In addition, fear of a pan-Islamism political rise throughout North Africa and the Sahel led the French to adopt policies that aimed to prevent the spread of Islam beyond where it already existed and to prevent Muslim leaders from governing non-Muslim communities. Indigenous religions and Christianity existed under less formal policies, and French efforts often used these to balance the spread of Islam in the region.

In the 1940s, a religious movement called Allah Koura began in the San Cercle based upon the visions of a single person. Local administrators allowed the Allah Koura movement to spread and practice, seeing it as a potential limiting influence on the spread of Islam farther south. In the late 1950s, Muslim protests and riots throughout the colony further contributed to a growing independence movement.

== Slavery policy ==
The French slavery policy for much of the 19th century was inconsistent and context-dependent. Slavery had been formally outlawed in 1848, but enforcement was often non-existent. Slaves were freed in directly administered colonies in 1883, and active interdiction of slave caravans began in the 1890s. This was dependent on the military situation, however; slavery was not interfered with in allied areas, but anti-French chiefs saw their runaway slaves welcomed and settled in villages de liberte. These functioned as labor reserves for the French, however, and many former slaves left them quickly.

In 1903, the government instructed French administrators not to use slave as an administrative category anymore and to not help masters recapture runaways. In March 1905, a slave exodus began in Banamba that preceded by six months a formal French decree ending slavery throughout French West Africa. With legal protection, almost a million slaves followed this example by moving away from their masters and settling elsewhere. The French supported these efforts by creating settlements around the Niger River and digging wells for communities elsewhere so they could farm away from their former masters.

This process affected the southern and western parts of present-day Mali most significantly, but in the northern and eastern parts of the colony large numbers of slaves remained in servitude to their masters. According to rough estimates, throughout the area of present-day Mali, about one-third of former slaves moved away from the slavery relationship, while two-thirds remained with their masters. In the 1920s, most Tuareg households still had slaves who tended to the house and animals.

Though slavery persisted, some aspects of the relationship changed with the French administration. Escaped slaves could find official protection by French authorities in the cities for a limited time. Slaves could sometimes renegotiate the terms of their servitude in the changed political situation. Some were willing to agree to remain in servitude if they received control over their family life and some land to pass to their children. In addition, the French administration actively worked to end slave raiding and the most clear manifestations of the slave trade, greatly reducing those means of acquiring slaves. However, for many decades after the 1905 abolition of slavery, the practice continued in much of French Sudan.

== Independence ==
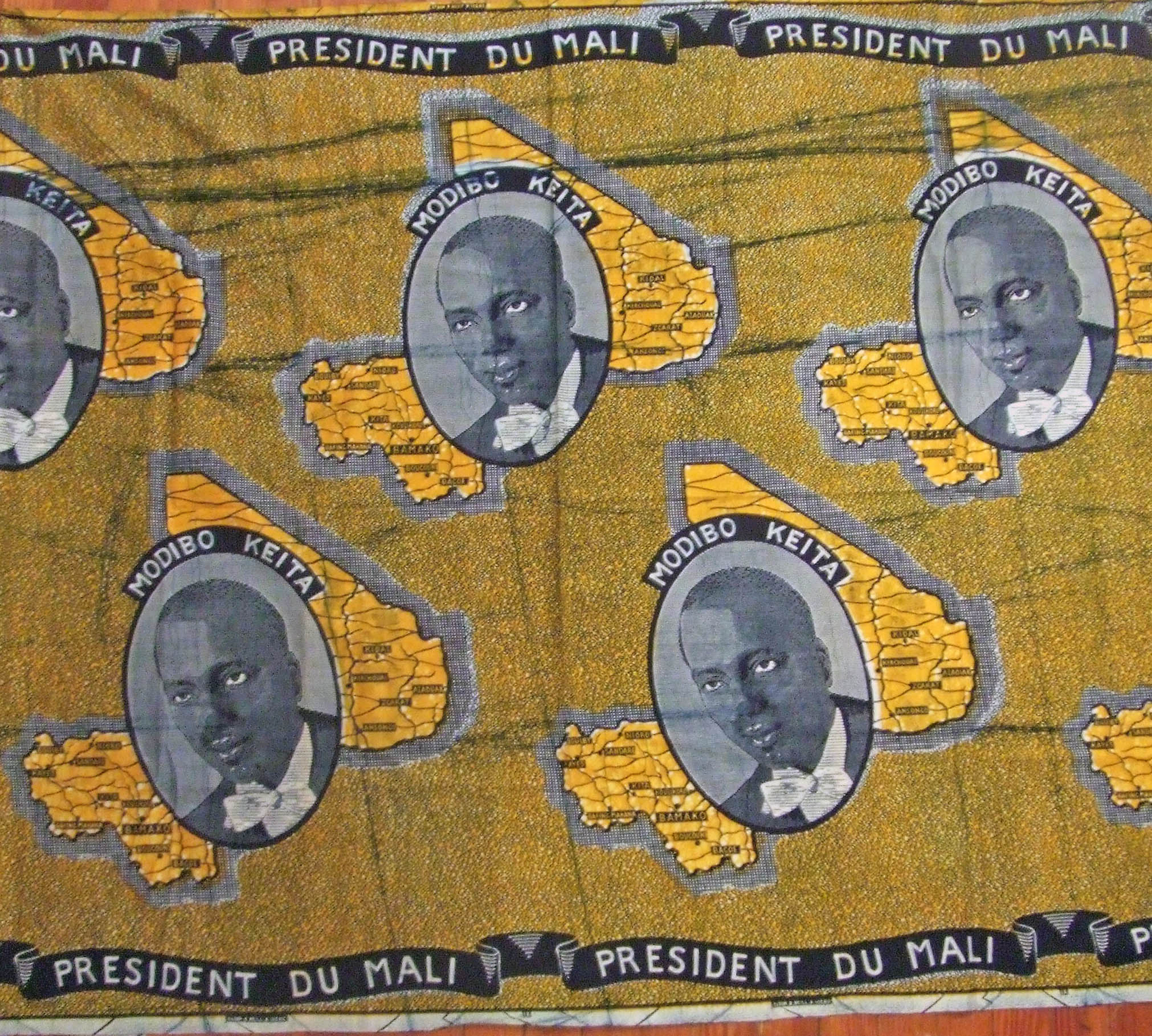
Printed textiles commemorating Modibo Keïta, the first President of Mali, who led French Sudan to independence

Following the passage of the Loi Cadre by the French National Assembly in 1956, many of the colonies in French West African began to hold elections to increase the self-determination of their territories. In the first elections held in French Sudan in 1957, the African Democratic Rally (Rassemblement Démocratique Africain, commonly known as the RDA) won the elections in French Sudan, as well as winning majorities in neighboring Ivory Coast, French Guinea, and the Upper Volta. Following the French constitutional referendum of 1958, which received an overwhelming majority in support, the République soudanaise declared itself a republic with internal autonomy on 24 November 1958. The Sudanese Republic, as the area was now called, was the second colony after Madagascar to join the French Community, which provided it internal autonomy while linking its currency, foreign policy and defense with France.

In early January 1959, there were plans for a federation linking the Sudanese Republic with Senegal, Dahomey, and the Upper Volta in a federation of autonomous states. By April, however, neither Dahomey's nor Upper Volta's legislatures had ratified the federation, and so the Mali Federation was formed with only the Sudanese Republic and Senegal. In 1959, Modibo Keïta's RDA party won all 70 seats in the legislative elections in the Sudanese Republic and joined forces with the dominant party in Senegal, headed by Léopold Sédar Senghor. The federation achieved independence on 20 June 1960 within the French Community; however, divisions between Senghor and Keïta on the governance of the federation resulted in its dissolution on 20 August 1960. The area of French Sudan formally proclaimed itself the Republic of Mali and, with increasing radicalization of Keita, left the French Community in September 1960.

== See also ==
- Sudan (region): the Sudan (or Soudan in French) climate region, of which French Sudan formed the western part.
- French colonial empire
- List of French possessions and colonies

== Bibliography ==
Books and Journal articles

- Anda, Michael O. (2000). International Relations in Contemporary Africa. University Press of America. ISBN 978-0-7618-1585-3.
- Becker, Laurence C. (1994). "An Early Experiment in the Reorganisation of Agricultural Production in the French Soudan (Mali), 1920–40". Africa. 64 (3): 373–390. doi:10.2307/1160787. JSTOR 1160787. S2CID 145744615.
- Bigon, Liora (2015) "Military Settlement Forms in Colonial Dakar and Western Sudan: Hesitative Moments" Journal of Asian and African Studies, doi: 10.1177/0021909614548240
- de Bruijn, Mirjam; Pelckmans, Lotte (2005). "Facing Dilemmas: Former Fulbe Slaves in Modern Mali". Canadian Journal of African Studies. 39 (1): 69–95.-
- Imperato, Pascal James; Imperato, Gavin H. (2008). Historical Dictionary of Mali. Maryland: Rowman & Littlefield. ISBN 978-0-8108-5603-5.
- Klein, Martin A. (1998). Slavery and Colonial Rule in French West Africa. London: Cambridge University Press.
- Klein, Martin A. (2005). "Concept of Honour and the Persistence of Servility in the Western Soudan". Cahiers d'Études Africaines. 45 (179/180): 831–851. doi:10.4000/etudesafricaines.5665 (inactive 12 July 2025).
- Chafer, Tony (2002). The End of Empire in French West Africa: France's Successful Decolonization?. Berg. ISBN 978-1-85973-557-2.
- Lea, David; Rowe, Annamarie (2001). A Political Chronology of Africa. Taylor & Francis. pp. 277–. ISBN 978-1-85743-116-2.
- Mann, Gregory (2003). "Fetishizing Religion: Allah Koura and French 'Islamic Policy' in Late Colonial French Soudan (Mali)". The Journal of African History. 44 (2): 263–282. doi:10.1017/s0021853703008442. S2CID 145420133.
- Mann, Gregory (2006). Native Sons: West African Veterans and France in the Twentieth Century. Duke University Press. ISBN 978-0-8223-3768-3.
- Mauxion, Aurelien (2012). "Moving to Stay: Iklan Spatial Strategies Towards Socioeconomic Emancipation in Northern Mali, 1898–1960". The Journal of African History. 53 (2): 195–213. doi:10.1017/s0021853712000394. S2CID 161662370.
- O'Brien, Donal Cruise (1967). "Towards an 'Islamic Policy' in French West Africa, 1854–1914". The Journal of African History. 8 (2): 303–316. doi:10.1017/s0021853700007076. S2CID 162336004.
- Seddon, David (2000). "Unfinished business: Slavery in Saharan Africa". Slavery & Abolition. 20 (2): 208–236. doi:10.1080/01440390008575313. S2CID 144946807.
- Thompson, Virginia Mclean; Adloff, Richard (1958). French West Africa. Stanford University Press. ISBN 978-0-8047-4256-6.

Newspapers (organized chronologically)

- "France in Cotton Project: Plan Immense African Irrigation Scheme to Produce Own Supply". The New York Times. 22 May 1921. p. 4.
- Durdin, Tillman (11 April 1957). "French Yielding in West Africa: Elections under New System Provide Greater Control by Negro Inhabitants". The New York Times. p. 3.
- "Links Kept in French Sudan Vote". The Washington Post. 25 November 1958. p. A5.
- Cutler, B.J. (18 January 1959). "4 French West Africa States Form a Nation: will Keep Ties with Paris, but can Secede Freely Under Constitution". New York Herald Tribune. p. 1.
- Teltsch, Kathleen (5 April 1959). "Africans Speed Pace of Drive for Freedom: Unrest and Violence are Growing as Movement Gains Momentum". p. E4.
- Howe, Russell (26 April 1959). "2-Party System Fails in Africa". The Washington Post. p. E5.
