= Flag of Mali =

National flag of the Republic of Mali
- Use: National flag and ensign
- Proportion: 2:3
- Adopted: 4 April 1959; 67 years ago
- Design: A vertical tricolour of green, gold, and red

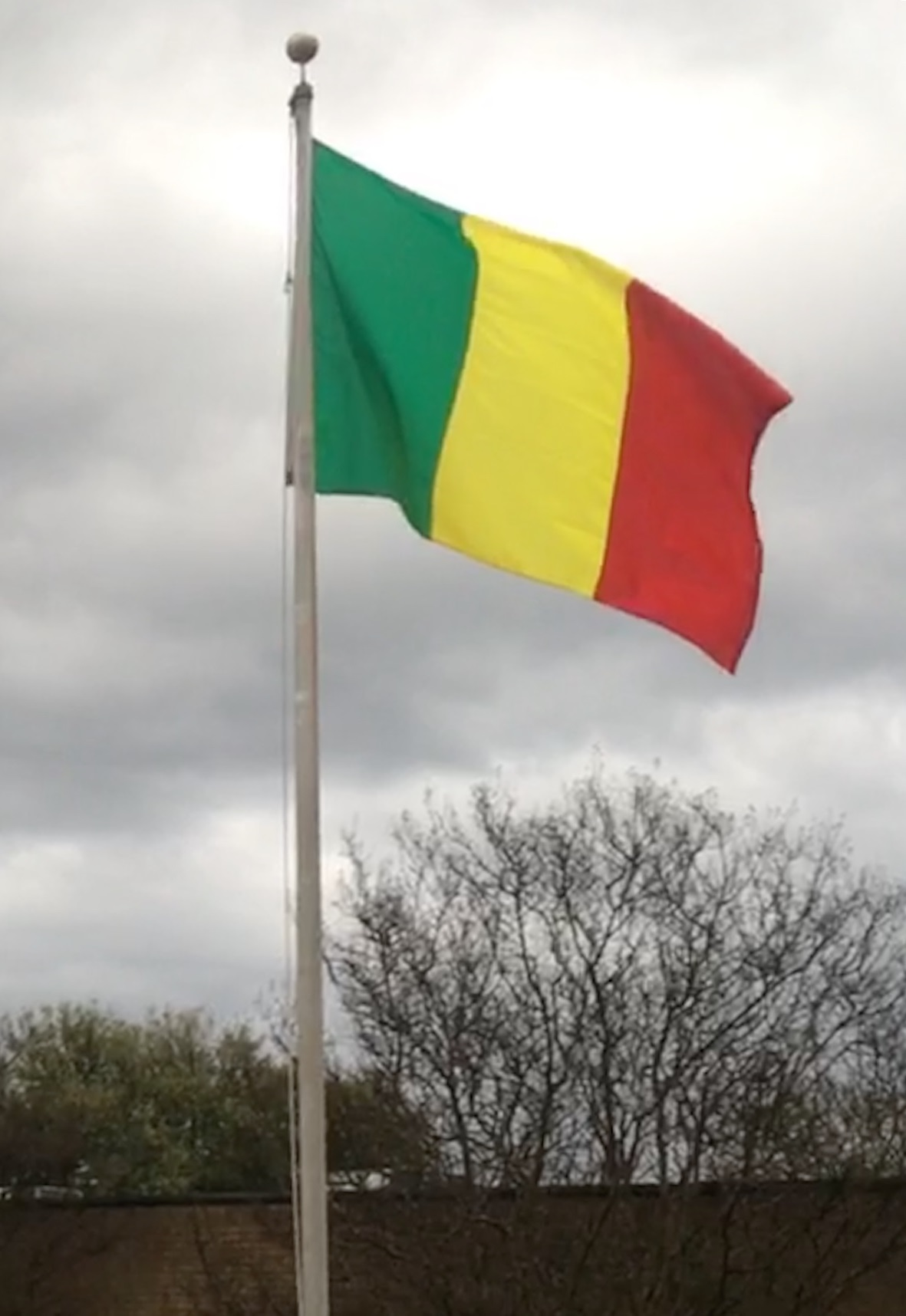
Flag of Mali

The national flag of Mali is a vertical tricolour of green, gold, and red, the pan-African colours.

== History ==
The current flag was adopted on 1 March 1961. The original flag was adopted on 4 April 1959, when Mali joined the Mali Federation. This flag was the same, except the golden stripe had a black kanaga, a shape of a squatter man with arms raised to the sky. The figure was removed due to the opposition, in a country whose population is 90% Muslim (95% Sunni 5% Shia), of Islamic fundamentalists (see Aniconism in Islam, the belief against making pictures of the human figure).

== Symbolism ==
The green stands for fertility of the land, gold stands for purity and mineral wealth, and the red symbolizes the blood shed for independence from the invader.

== Colour scheme ==
Mali	Green	Gold	Red
Pantone	2271c	115c	3546c
CMYK	91-0-100-0	0-9-100-0	0-86-63-0
RGB	20-181-58	252-209-22	206-17-38
Hexadecimal	#14B53A	#FCD116	#CE1126

== Historical flags ==
Flag	Years of use	Ratio	Government	Description
	c. 1324		Mali Empire (possible)	The royal standard of Musa I (Mansa Musa) of the Mali Empire was reportedly a yellow rectangle centered on a red field.
	1880–1958	2:3	French Sudan (Note: The colonial region of French Sudan went through a number of administrative reorganizations between 1880 and 1959, changing names several times throughout the process. See: French Sudan § Administration and jurisdiction)	The French tricolor was used as the official flag of French Sudan for most of its history.
	1958–1959	2:3	French Sudan	A new flag was adopted in 1958, when French Sudan gained autonomy within the French Community. It consisted of the French tricolor with a black Kanaga centered on the white band.
	1959–1960	2:3	Mali Federation	The flag initially adopted on Malian independence consisted of a vertical tricolor of green, gold, and red with a black Kanaga centered on the gold band.
	1960-1961	2:3	Republic of Mali	The flag initially adopted on Malian independence consisted of a vertical tricolor of green, gold, and red with a black Kanaga centered on the gold band.
	1961–present	2:3	Republic of Mali	The current flag of Mali was adopted on 1 March 1961, removing the Kanaga featured on the previous flag.

== Other flags ==
Historical flag of the Massina Empire (1818–1862), located in the present-day regions of Mopti and Ségou

Historical flag of the Wassoulou Empire (1878–1898), located in the Wassoulou region (part of present-day Mali, Guinea, and Côte d'Ivoire).

Flag of the Arab Movement of Azawad, a militant organization active in Azawad/northern Mali.

Flag of the Imghad Tuareg Self-Defense Group and Allies, a militant organization active in the Gao and Kidal regions.

Flag of the Movement for the Salvation of Azawad, a militant organization and political movement active in the Gao and Kidal regions.

Roundel of the Mali Air Force

Roundel of the Mali Air Force (variant)

== See also ==
- List of Malian flags
- Coat of arms of Mali
- Flag of Senegal, a very similar flag
- Flag of Guinea, a mirrored version of the flag
- Flag of Bolivia, a rotated version of the flag
- Pan-African colours
- Malay tricolour, which share the same three colours as the Mali flag
