= List of entities that have issued postage stamps (F–L) =

This is a list of entities that have issued postage stamps at some point since stamps were introduced in 1840. The list includes any kind of governmental entity or officially approved organisation that has issued distinctive types of stamp for postal purposes. These include post offices in foreign countries and postal services organised by military occupations, international organisations, colonies, provinces, city-states and some revolutionary movements. The list includes members of the Universal Postal Union that are also listed at postal organisations.

Many of these entities are historic and some were very short-lived indeed. Philatelists and stamp collectors often refer to the entities that no longer issue stamps as dead countries.

The dates are the generally agreed-upon dates of first and last stamp issues. "Date of issue" is taken to mean the date when a particular type or variation was first issued but its usage would often continue for many years. For example, although an entity may have issued its last stamp in 1951, actual usage may have continued until 1960: in that case, 1951 is the last stamp issue date.

Besides the period of which stamps were issued in the name of a particular entity, the list under that entity also bears any other name in which stamps had been issued for territory, name of any other entity which had had its stamps used in that territory, or new names which had subsequently replaced the name of that entity, together with their respective periods.

== List ==
The list has been comprehensively revised to include extra entities and to direct the links away from the country articles to the (proposed) philatelic articles.

=== Falkland Islands ===
- Falkland Islands 1878 –

=== Falkland Islands Dependencies ===
- Falkland Islands Dependencies 1946 –

=== Faroe Islands ===
- Faroe Islands (British Occupation during WWII)
- Faroe Islands 1975 –

=== Fiji ===
- Fiji 1870 –

=== Finland ===
- Finland 1856 –
- Åland Islands 1984 –
- Finnish Post Abroad
- Aunus (Finnish Occupation) 1919 only
- Eastern Karelia (Finnish Occupation) 1941–1944
- Karjala 1922 (only)

=== Fiume ===
- Arbe 1920 only
- Fiume (Free State) 1918–1924
- Fiume (Yugoslav Occupation) 1945–1947
- Veglia 1920 only

=== France ===
- France 1849 –
- French Somali Coast 1902–1967
- Guadeloupe 1884–1947
- Martinique 1886–1947
- Reunion 1885–1974
- St Pierre et Miquelon 1885–1978

=== French Colonies ===
- Algeria (French Colony) 1924–1958
- Benin (French Colony) 1892–1899
- Chad (French Colony) 1922–1937
- Dahomey 1899–1944; 1960–1975
- Dakar – Abidjan 1959 only
- Djibouti (French Colony) 1893–1902
- Fezzan and Ghadames 1943–1951
- French Colonies 1859–1886
- French Committee of National Liberation 1943–1945
- French Congo 1891–1906
- French Equatorial Africa (AEF) 1936–1958
- French Guiana 1886–1947
- French Guinea 1892–1944
- French Indian Settlements 1892–1954
- French Morocco 1914–1956
- French Oceanic Settlements 1892–1956
- French Polynesia 1958 –
- French Protectorate, Morocco 1914–1915
- French Soudan 1894–1944
- French Southern and Antarctic Territories 1955 –
- French Territory of Afars and Issas 1967–1977
- French West Africa 1944–1959
- Gabon (French Colony) 1886–1937
- Inini 1932–1946
- Ivory Coast (French Colony) 1892–1944
- Mali Federation 1959–1960
- Mauritania (French Colony) 1906–1944
- Mayotte 1997–
- Middle Congo 1907–1937
- New Caledonia 1860 –
- Niger (French Colony) 1921–1944
- Obock 1892–1894
- Oubangui – Chari 1922–1937
- Oubangui – Chari – Tchad 1915–1922
- Senegal (French Colony) 1887 –
- Senegambia and Niger 1903–1906
- Tahiti 1882–1915
- Togo (French Colony) 1921–1957
- Upper Senegal and Niger 1906–1921
- Upper Volta (French Colony) 1920–1933
- Vietnam (French Colony) 1945–1954
- Wallis and Futuna Islands 1920 –

=== French Post Offices Abroad ===
- French post offices abroad
- Alexandria (French Post Office) 1899–1931
- Andorra (French Offices) 1931 –
- Arad (French Occupation) 1919 only
- Beirut (French Post Office) 1905 only
- Castelrosso (French Occupation) 1920–1921
- China (French Post Offices) 1894–1922
- Cilicia (French Occupation) 1918–1921
- Crete (French Post Offices) 1902–1913
- Dedeagatz (French Post Office) 1893–1914
- Egypt (French Post Offices) 1899–1931
- Ethiopia (French Post Offices) 1906–1908
- French Volunteers against Bolshevism(French Post Offices) 1941–1944
- Japan (French Post Offices) 1865–1880
- Kavalla (French Post Office) 1893–1914
- Klaipėda 1923 only
- Korce (Koritza) 1917–1919
- Madagascar (French Post Offices) 1885–1896
- Majunga (French Post Office) 1895 only
- Memel (French Administration) 1920–1923
- Morocco (French Post Offices) 1862–1914
- Port Lagos (French Post Office) 1893–1898
- Port Said (French Post Office) 1899–1931
- Syria (French Occupation) 1919–1924
- Tangier (French Post Office) 1918–1942
- Saar (French Administration) 1920–1935
- Tientsin (French Post Office) 1903–1922
- Vathy (French Post Offices) 1893–1914
- Zanzibar (French Post Office) 1889–1904
- French post offices in the Turkish Empire 1885–1923
- Postage of the Free French Forces in the Levant 1942–1946

=== Gabon ===
- Gabon 1959 –

=== Gambia ===
- Gambia 1869 –

=== Georgia ===
- Georgia 1993 –
- Georgia (pre-Soviet) 1919–1923

=== German Colonies ===
- Caroline Islands (Karolinen) 1899–1914
- German East Africa 1893–1916
- German New Guinea 1898–1914
- German Samoa 1900–1914
- German South West Africa 1888–1915
- German Togo 1897–1914
- Kamerun 1897–1915
- Kiautschou 1901–1914
- Mariana Islands (Marianen) 1899–1914
- Marshall Islands (German Colony) 1897–1916

=== German Post Abroad ===
- Albania (German Occupation) 1943–1944
- Alsace (German Occupation) 1940–1941
- Alsace-Lorraine 1870–1871
- Belgium (German Occupation) 1914–1918
- China (German Post Offices) 1898–1917
- Dalmatia (German Occupation) 1943–1945
- Dorpat (German Occupation) 1918 only
- Eastern Command Area 1916–1918
- Estonia (German Occupation) 1941 only
- German Ninth Army Post 1918 only
- Postage of German Occupation Forces (WW1) 1914–1918
- German Occupation Issues (World War II) 1939–1945
- German post offices in the Turkish Empire 1884–1914
- Laibach (German Occupation) 1943–1945
- Latvia (German Occupation) 1941 only
- Lithuania (German Occupation) 1941 only
- Lorraine (German Occupation) 1940–1941
- Luxembourg (German Occupation) 1940–1944
- Macedonia (German Occupation) 1944 only
- Montenegro (German Occupation) 1943–1945
- Morocco (German Post Offices) 1899–1917
- Ostland 1941–1945
- Poland (German Occupation WW1) 1915–1918
- Poland (German Occupation World War II) 1939–1945
- Romania (German Occupation) 1917–1918
- Serbia (German Occupation) 1941–1944
- Ukraine (German Occupation) 1941–1944
- Western Command Area 1916–1918
- Zante (German Occupation) 1943–1945
- Zanzibar (German Postal Agency) 1890–1891

=== German States ===
- Baden 1851–1871
- Bavaria 1849–1920
- Bergedorf 1861–1867
- Bremen 1855–1867
- Brunswick 1852–1868
- Hamburg 1859–1867
- Foreign post offices in Hamburg (Danish)
- Hanover 1850–1866
- Heligoland 1867–1890
- Holstein 1850, 1864–1867
- Lübeck 1859–1868
- Mecklenburg-Schwerin 1856–1868
- Mecklenburg-Strelitz 1864–1868
- North German Confederation 1868–1871
- Oldenburg 1852–1867
- Prussia 1850–1867
- Saxony 1850–1868
- Schleswig 1864–1868
- Schleswig-Holstein 1850–1868
- Postage of Thurn and Taxis (Northern District) 1849–1866
- Postage of Thurn and Taxis (Southern District) 1852–1867
- Württemberg 1851–1924

=== Germany ===
- East Germany 1949–1991
- Germany 1991 –
- Germany (Allied Occupation) 1945–1949
- Imperial Germany 1872–1919
- Third Reich 1933–1945
- Weimar Republic 1919–1932
- West Berlin 1948–1991
- West Germany 1949–1991

=== Germany (Allied Occupation) ===
- American, British and Russian Zones 1946–1948
- Anglo-American Zones (Civil Government) 1948–1949
- Anglo-American Zones (Military Government) 1945–1946
- Baden (French Zone) 1947–1949
- Postage of Berlin-Brandenburg in the Russian Zone 1945 only
- French Zone (General Issues) 1945–1946
- Postage of Mecklenburg-Vorpommern in the Russian Zone 1945–1946
- Postage of North West Saxony in the Russian Zone 1945–1946
- Postage of the Rhineland-Palatinate in the French Zone 1947–1949
- Russian Zone (General Issues) 1948–1949
- Saar (French Zone) 1945–1947
- Saxony (Russian Zone) 1945–1946
- Postage of South East Saxony in the Russian Zone 1945–1946
- Thuringia (Russian Zone) 1945–1946
- Württemberg (French Zone) 1947–1949

=== Ghana ===
- Ghana 1957 –
- Gold Coast 1875–1957

=== Gibraltar ===
- Gibraltar 1886 –

=== Gilbert and Ellice Islands ===
- Gilbert and Ellice Islands 1911–1975
- Gilbert Islands 1976–1979
- Kiribati 1979 –
- Tuvalu 1976 –

=== Greece ===
- Epirus 1914–1916
- Greece 1861 –
- Ikaria 1912–1913
- Samos 1912–1915

=== Greek Post Abroad ===
- Albania (Greek Occupation) 1940–1941
- Dodecanese Islands (Greek Occupation) 1947 only
- Greek Post Offices in the Turkish Empire 1861–1881
- Kavalla (Greek Occupation) 1913 only
- Khios 1913 only
- Lemnos 1912–1913
- Lesbos 1912–1913

=== Greenland ===
- Greenland 1938 –

=== Guatemala ===
- Guatemala 1871 –

=== Guinea ===
- Guinea 1959 –

=== Guinea–Bissau ===
- Guinea–Bissau 1974 –

=== Guyana ===
- Guyana 1966 –

=== Haiti ===
- Postage stamps and postal history of Haiti 1881 –

=== Honduras ===
- Honduras 1866 –

=== Hong Kong ===
- Hong Kong (British colony) 1862 – 1997
- Hong Kong, China 1997 -

=== Hungary ===
- Hungary 1871 –

=== Iceland ===
- Iceland 1873 – 2020

=== India ===
- Postage stamps and postal history of India 1852 –
- Postage stamps and postal history of the Indian states

=== Indian Convention States ===
- Chamba 1886–1948
- Faridkot 1879–1887
- Gwalior 1885–1948
- Jind 1874–1885
- Nabha 1885–1948
- Patiala 1884–1947

=== Indian Native States ===
- Alwar 1877 only
- Bamra 1888–1890
- Barwani 1921–1938
- Bhopal 1876–1949
- Bhor 1879–1901
- Bijawar 1935–1937
- Bundi 1894–1948
- Bussahir 1895–1896
- Charkari 1894–1940
- Cochin 1892–1949
- Dhar 1897–1898
- Dungarpur 1932–1948
- Duttia 1893–1899
- Hyderabad 1869–1948
- Idar 1939–1950
- Indore 1886–1950
- Jaipur 1904–1948
- Jammu and Kashmir 1866–1894
- Jasdan 1942 only
- Jhalawar 1887–1900
- Kishangarh 1899–1947
- Las Bela 1897 only
- Morvi 1931–1948
- Nandgaon 1892–1895
- Nawanager 1877–1895
- Orchha 1913–1939
- Poonch 1876–1894
- Rajasthan 1948–1950
- Rajpipla 1880–1886
- Scinde 1852–1854
- Shahpura 1914–1920
- Sirmoor 1879–1902
- Soruth (Saurashtra) 1864–1949
- Travancore 1888–1949
- Travancore – Cochin 1949–1951
- Wadhwan 1888–1892

=== Indian Overseas Forces ===
- China Expeditionary Force 1900–1923
- Congo (Indian UN Force) 1962 only
- Gaza (Indian UN Force) 1965 only
- Indian Expeditionary Forces 1914–1922
- Indo–China (Indian Forces) 1954–1968
- Korea (Indian Custodian Forces) 1953 only
- Mosul (Indian Forces) 1919 only

=== Indo–China ===
- Annam (Indo–China) 1936 only
- Annam and Tongking 1888–1892
- Cambodia 1951 –
- Cambodia (Indo–China) 1936
- Cochin–China 1886–1889
- Indo–China 1889–1949
- Kampuchea 1980–1989
- Khmer Republic 1971–1975
- Laos 1951 –
- NFLSV (VietCong) 1963–1976
- North Vietnam 1946–1976
- South Vietnam 1955–1976
- Vietnam 1976 –

=== Indo–Chinese Post in China ===
- Canton (Indo–Chinese Post Office) 1901–1922
- China (Indo–Chinese Post Offices) 1900–1922
- Hoi–Hao (Indo–Chinese Post Office) 1902–1922
- Kouang–Tcheou 1898–1943
- Mong–Tseu (Indo–Chinese Post Office) 1903–1922
- Pakhoi (Indo–Chinese Post Office) 1903–1922
- Tchongking (Indo – Chinese Post Office) 1903–1922
- Yunnanfu (Indo–Chinese Post Office) 1903–1922

=== Indonesia ===
- Indonesia 1945 –
- Riau–Lingga Archipelago 1954–1965
- West Irian 1963 – 1970
- Philatelic items of 2018 Asian Games 2018

=== International Organisations ===
- Postage of the Council of Europe 1950 –
- Postage of the International Court of Justice 1934–1958
- Postage of the International Education Office 1944–1960
- Postage of the International Labour Office 1923–1960
- Postage of the International Refugees Organisation 1950 only
- Postage of the International Telecommunication Union 1958–1960
- League of Nations (Geneva) 1922–1944
- UNESCO 1961–1981
- United Nations (UN) 1951 –
- Universal Postal Union (UPU) 1957 –
- World Health Organisation 1948–1975
- Postage of the World Intellectual Property Organisation 1982 only
- Postage of the World Meteorological Organisation 1956–1973

=== Ionian Islands ===
- Ionian Islands 1859–1864

=== Iran ===
- Iran 1935 –
- Persian Socialist Republic 1919-1921
- Persia 1868–1935

=== Iraq ===
- Iraq 1923 –
- Mesopotamia 1917–1922

=== Ireland, Republic of ===
- Ireland 1922 –

=== Israel ===
- Israel 1948 –

=== Italian Colonies ===
- Aegean Islands (Dodecanese) 1912–1945
- Astypalaea 1912–1932
- Benadir 1903–1905
- Cyrenaica 1923–1952
- Eritrea (Italian Colony) 1893–1942
- Italian Colonies (General Issues) 1932–1934
- Italian East Africa 1938–1941
- Italian Somaliland 1905–1936
- Jubaland 1925–1926
- Kalimnos 1912–1932
- Karpathos 1912–1932
- Kasos 1912–1932
- Kastellórizo 1920–1932
- Khalki 1912–1932
- Kos 1912–1932
- Leros 1912–1932
- Lipsos 1912–1932
- Nisyros 1912–1932
- Patmos (Patmo) 1912–1932
- Rhodes 1912–1935
- Syme 1912–1932
- Telos 1912–1932
- Tripolitania 1923–1943

=== Italian Post Abroad ===
- Italian post offices in Africa
- Albania (Italian Occupation) 1939–1943
- Benghazi (Italian Post Office) 1901–1912
- Cephalonia and Ithaca (Italian Occupation) 1941 only
- Italian post offices in China
- Constantinople (Italian Post Office) 1908–1923
- Corfu (Italian Occupation) 1923 only
- Corfu and Paxos (Italian Occupation) 1941 only
- Italian post offices in Crete
- Dalmatia (Italian Occupation) 1919–1923
- Durazzo (Italian Post Office) 1902–1916
- Italian post offices in Egypt
- Ethiopia (Italian Occupation) 1936 only
- Fiume and Kupa Zone 1941–1942
- Ionian Islands (Italian Occupation) 1941–1943
- Italian Post Offices in the Turkish Empire 1873–1923
- Jannina (Italian Post Office) 1909–1911
- Jerusalem (Italian Post Office) 1909–1911
- Khania (Italian Post Office) 1900–1912
- Lubiana (Italian Occupation) 1941 only
- Montenegro (Italian Occupation) 1941–1943
- Pechino (Italian Post Office) 1917–1922
- Salonika (Italian Post Office) 1909–1911
- Saseno (Italian Occupation) 1923 only
- Scutari (Italian Post Office) 1909–1915
- Smirne (Italian Post Office) 1909–1911
- Tientsin (Italian Post Office) 1917–1922
- Trentino (Italian Occupation) 1918–1919
- Tripoli (Italian Post Office) 1909–1912
- Valona (Italian Post Office) 1909–1916
- Venezia Giulia (Italian Occupation) 1918–1919

=== Italian States ===
- Modena 1852–1860
- Naples 1858–1861
- Neapolitan Provinces 1861–1862
- Papal States 1852–1870
- Parma 1852–1860
- Piedmont 1851–1862
- Romagna 1859–1860
- Sardinia 1851–1863
- Sicily 1859–1860
- Tuscany 1851–1860
- Two Sicilies 1858–1861

=== Italy ===
- Campione d'Italia 1944 only
- Italian Social Republic 1944–1945
- Italy 1862 –

=== Ivory Coast ===
- Côte d'Ivoire 1959 –

=== Jamaica ===
- Jamaica 1860 –

=== Japan ===
- Japan 1871 –
- Ryukyu Islands 1948–1972

=== Japanese Post Abroad ===
- Brunei (Japanese Occupation) 1942–1945
- Burma (Japanese Occupation) 1942–1945
- Central China (Japanese Occupation) 1941–1944
- Honan (Japanese Occupation) 1941
- Hong Kong (Japanese Occupation) 1945 only
- Hopei (Japanese Occupation) 1941
- Inner Mongolia (Japanese Occupation) 1941–1943
- Japanese Taiwan (Formosa) 1945 only
- Java (Japanese Occupation) 1943–1945
- Kelantan (Japanese Occupation) 1942–1945
- Korea (Japanese Post Offices) 1900–1901
- Kwangtung (Japanese Occupation) 1942–1945
- Malaya (Japanese Occupation) 1942–1945
- Manchukuo 1932–1945
- Mengkiang (Japanese Occupation) 1942–1945
- Nangking and Shanghai (Japanese Occupation) 1941–1945
- North Borneo (Japanese Occupation) 1942–1945
- North China (Japanese Occupation) 1942–1945
- Japanese post in occupied China 1941–1942
- Sarawak (Japanese Occupation) 1942–1945
- Shansi (Japanese Occupation) 1941
- Shantung (Japanese Occupation) 1941
- South China (Japanese Occupation) 1942
- Sumatra (Japanese Occupation) 1943–1945
- Supeh (Japanese Occupation) 1941
- Philippines (Japanese Occupation) 1942–1945
- China (Japanese Post Offices) 1900–1922
- Japanese Naval Control Area 1942–1943

=== Jordan ===
- Jordan 1920 –
- Palestine (Jordanian Occupation) 1948–1950
- Transjordan 1920–1949

=== Kazakhstan ===
- Kazakhstan 1992 –

=== Kenya ===
- Kenya 1963 –

=== Korea ===
- Korea (Empire) 1884–1910
- North Korea 1948 –
- South Korea 1946 –
- South Korea (North Korean Occupation) 1950 only

=== Kosovo ===
- Kosovo 2000 –

=== Kuwait ===
- Kuwait 1923 –

=== Kyrgyzstan ===
- Kyrgyzstan 1992 –

=== Labuan ===
- Labuan 1879 – 1906
- Malaysia 1963 –
- Straits Settlements 1867 – 1979

=== Latvia ===
- Cesis aka Wenden 1863–1901
- Latvia 1918–1940; 1991 –

=== Lebanon ===
- Greater Lebanon 1924–1926
- Lebanon 1924 –

=== Leeward Islands ===
- Anguilla 1967 –
- Antigua 1862 –
- Antigua and Barbuda 1981 –
- Barbuda 1922 –
- British Virgin Islands 1968 –
- Danish West Indies 1855–1917
- Dominica 1874 –
- Leeward Islands 1890–1956
- Montserrat 1876 –
- Nevis 1980 –
- Nevis (British Colonial Issues) 1861–1890
- St Christopher 1870–1890
- St Christopher Nevis and Anguilla 1952–1980
- St Kitts 1980 –
- St Kitts Nevis and Anguilla 1967–1971
- St Kitts–Nevis 1903–1980
- Virgin Islands 1866–1968

=== Lesotho ===
- Basutoland 1933–1966
- Lesotho 1966 –

=== Liberia ===
- Liberia 1860 –

=== Libya ===
- Ottoman Empire postal administration
- Foreign postal services in Libya during the Ottoman Empire postal administration
- Italian Occupation: postal administration 1911–1943
- British Administration: postal administration in Tripolitania and Cyrenaica 1942–1951
- French Administration: postal administration in Fezzan 1943–1951
- Cyrenaica Independent Kingdom: postal administration 1950–1951
- Kingdom of Libya: postal administration 1951–1969
- General Posts and Telecommunications Company (GPTC) 1969 –
- L.A.R. Libyan Arab Republic 1969–1977
- S.P.L.A.J. Socialist People's Libyan Arab Jamahiriya 1977–1988
- G.S.P.L.A.J. The Great Socialist People's Libyan Arab Jamahiriya 1988 –

=== Liechtenstein ===
- Liechtenstein 1912 –

=== Lithuania ===
- Lithuania 1918–1940; 1990 –

=== Luxembourg ===
- Luxembourg 1852 –

== See also ==
- List of entities that have issued postage stamps (A–E)
- List of entities that have issued postage stamps (M–Z)

== Bibliography ==
- Stanley Gibbons Ltd, Europe and Colonies 1970, Stanley Gibbons Ltd, 1969
- Stanley Gibbons Ltd, various catalogues
- Stuart Rossiter & John Flower, The Stamp Atlas, W H Smith, 1989
- XLCR Stamp Finder and Collector's Dictionary, Thomas Cliffe Ltd, c.1960
- Rimeco S.A. / Switzerland, "Stamp Catalogue of Libya from 1942" and "Stamp Catalogue of Libyan Jamahiriya"
