= Navigation and Commerce issue =

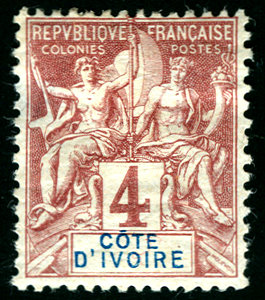
An 1892 4c stamp for Côte d'Ivoire of the Navigation and Commerce series

The Navigation and Commerce issue is a series of key type stamps issued for the colonial territories of France. It was designed by Louis-Eugène Mouchon.

The issue uses a standard design featuring allegorical representations of navigation and commerce. The territory name is imprinted in a rectangular cartouche centered at the bottom of the stamp.

In French colonies, it is the first series of territory-specific postal releases. Adding the territory name helped reduce revenue loss incurred when stamps were purchased in colonies with low-value currencies, then sold or used in colonies with high-valued currencies.

It was first released in 1892, with later releases featuring new color schemes. Dates vary by territory, but by 1900 values start appearing surcharged in red or black ink to use the remaining stocks while colonies then used illustrated stamps.

== List of French territories that used Navigation and Commerce stamps ==
- Anjouan
- Benin
- Côte d'Ivoire
- Dahomey
- Diego-Suárez
- French Congo
- French Guiana
- French Guinea
- French Polynesia/Oceania
- French Sudan
- Gabon
- Grand Comoro Island
- Guadeloupe
- India
- Indochina
- Madagascar
- Martinique
- Mayotte
- Moheli
- New Caledonia
- Nossi-Be
- Obock
- Reunion
- Senegal
- Senegambia & Niger
- Saint Pierre and Miquelon
- Ste. Marie de Madagascar
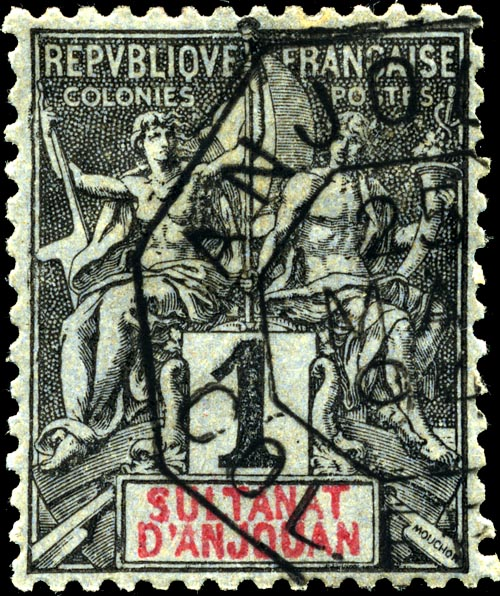
Anjouan

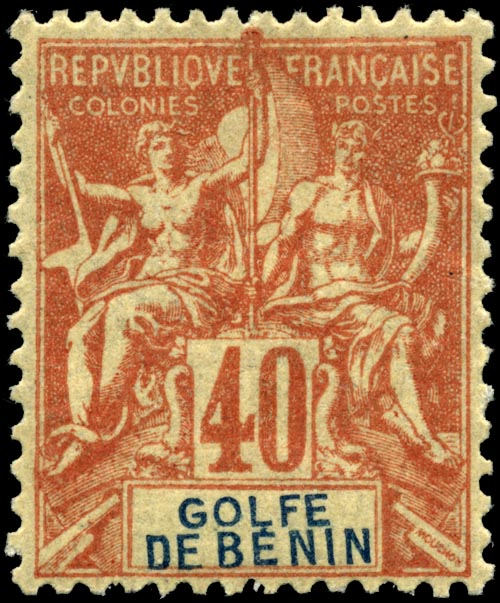
Benin

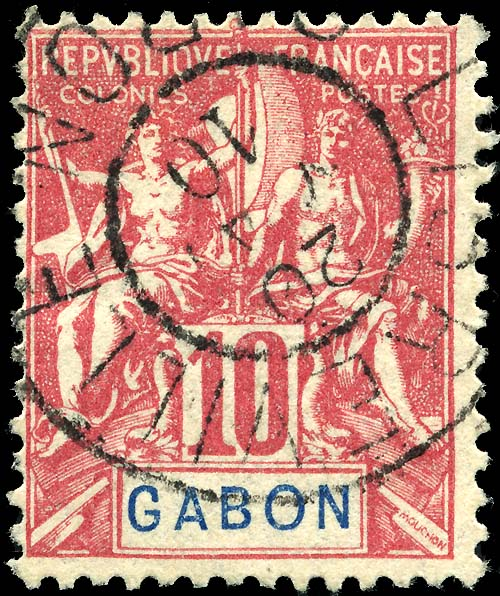
Gabon

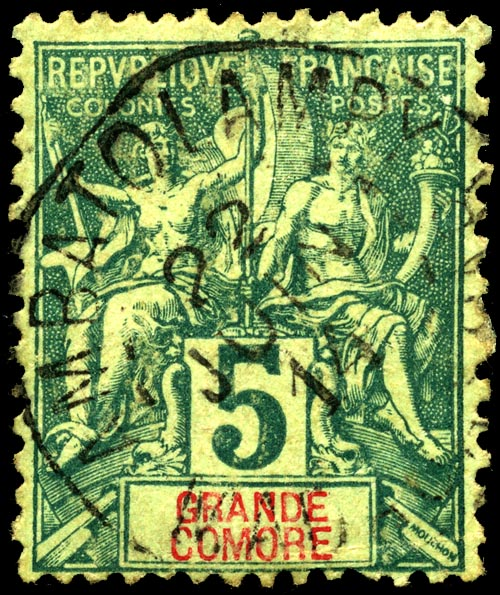
Grand Comoro

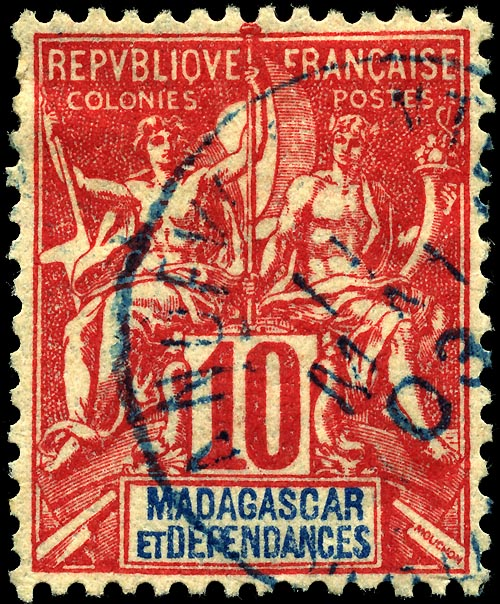
Madagascar

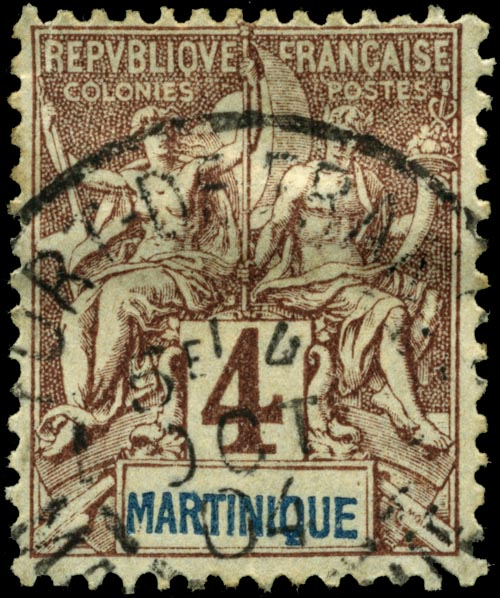
Martinique

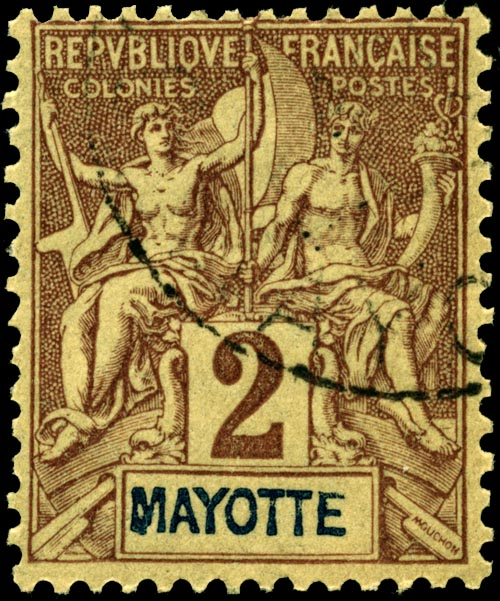
Mayotte

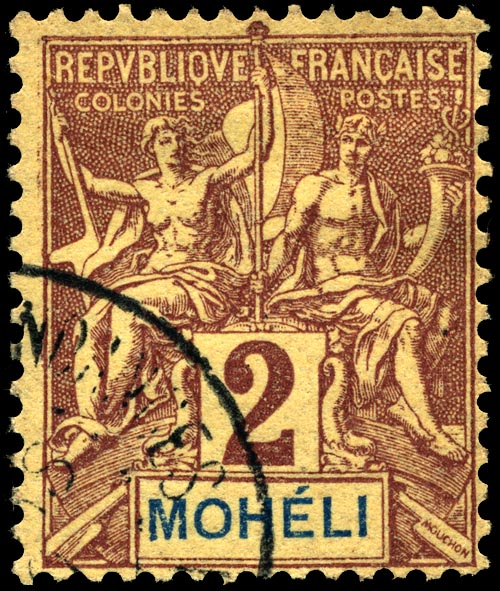
Moheli

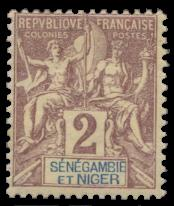
Senegambia & Niger

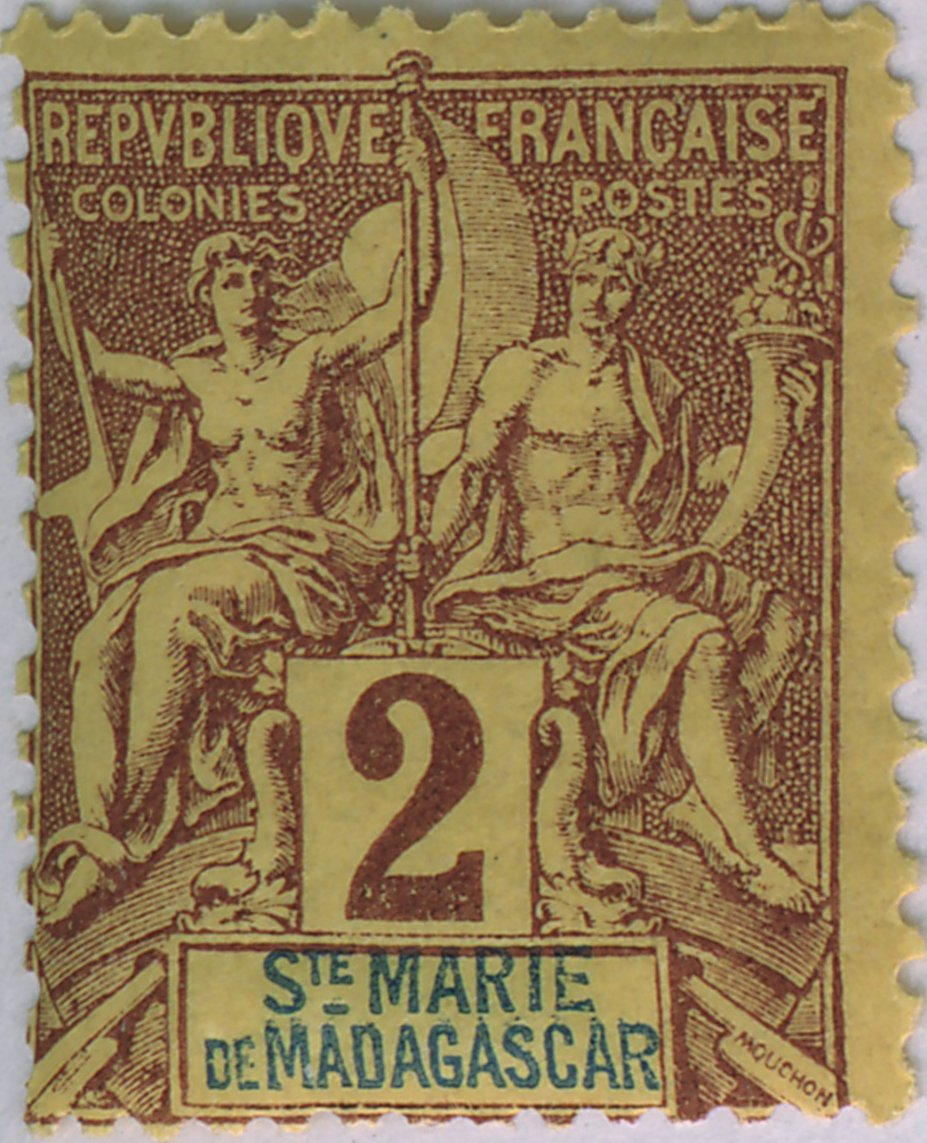
Ste. Marie de Madagascar

== Forgeries ==
Charles Hirschburger, a forger of postage stamps, and successor to master forger François Fournier, made copies of the Navigation and Commerce stamps from the various colonies, including "most denominations". These were produced between 1917 and 1923 and are sometimes called "Fournier" forgeries. They are still extremely common. The forgeries are perforated 13.5 by 14, whereas the genuine ones are 14 by 13.5. There are also details in the designs which distinguish the forgeries. The forgeries were made on sheets of 30 stamps, each having a different colony name in the lower panel. Counterfeit overprints also were made for this series.
