= Jean-Charles Bouloc =

French painter

- Born: 25 November 1930; Aveyron
- Died: 7 March 2014 (aged 83); Punaauia
- Known for: Painter

Jean-Charles Bouloc (November 25, 1930 in Aveyron - March 7, 2014 in Punaauia in French Polynesia) was a French painter.

In 1970 one of his portraits was chosen as the official stamp of the French Polynesian Post Office and won first prize in philately.

In 2009 Riccardo Pineri dedicated a book to him, published by Ura.

== See also ==
- Postage stamps and postal history of French Polynesia
