= Postage stamps and postal history of French Polynesia =

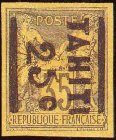
A "Peace and Commerce" issue overprinted for use in Tahiti, 1882

This is a survey of the postal history and postage stamps of French Polynesia, formerly known as the French Oceania.

The first postage stamps used in French Polynesia were the general stamps of the French Colonies from 1862.

In 1882 a shortage of 25c stamps necessitated a surcharge on less-used values. Some of the surcharges also included the name "TAHITI". This happened again in 1884 with 5c and 10c values.

Stamps inscribed "Établissements de l'Oceanie" (French Settlements in Oceania) became available in 1892 with the Navigation and Commerce issue.

In 1893, two kinds of overprint were applied to the remaining stocks of regular and postage due French Colonies stamps; one type was a slanted overprint reading "TAHITI" and the other was a horizontal "1893 / TAHITI". For some values of stamps, very few were left to be overprinted, and genuine overprints are quite rare, the rarest being the horizontal overprint on the 25c yellow at around US$20,000.

In 1903, due to a shortage of 10c stamps, stamps of French Oceania were overprinted "TAHITI" and surcharged with new face values. Stamps of French Oceania also received a red cross and "TAHITI" overprint in 1915 for use as semi-postal stamps.

Stamps since 1958 have been inscribed "French Polynesia".

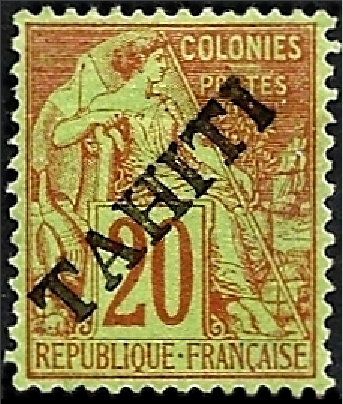
A 20c French Colonies stamp overprinted for use in Tahiti, 1893

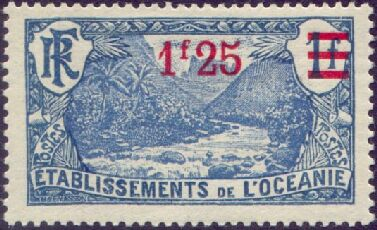
A 1924 stamp of French Oceania

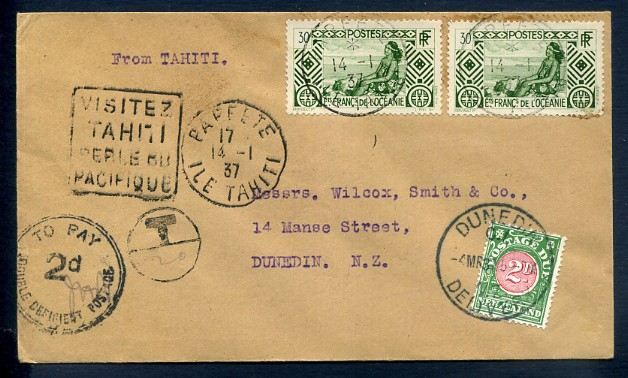
A 1937 letter from Tahiti to New Zealand bearing stamps of French Oceania and a New Zealand postage due stamp

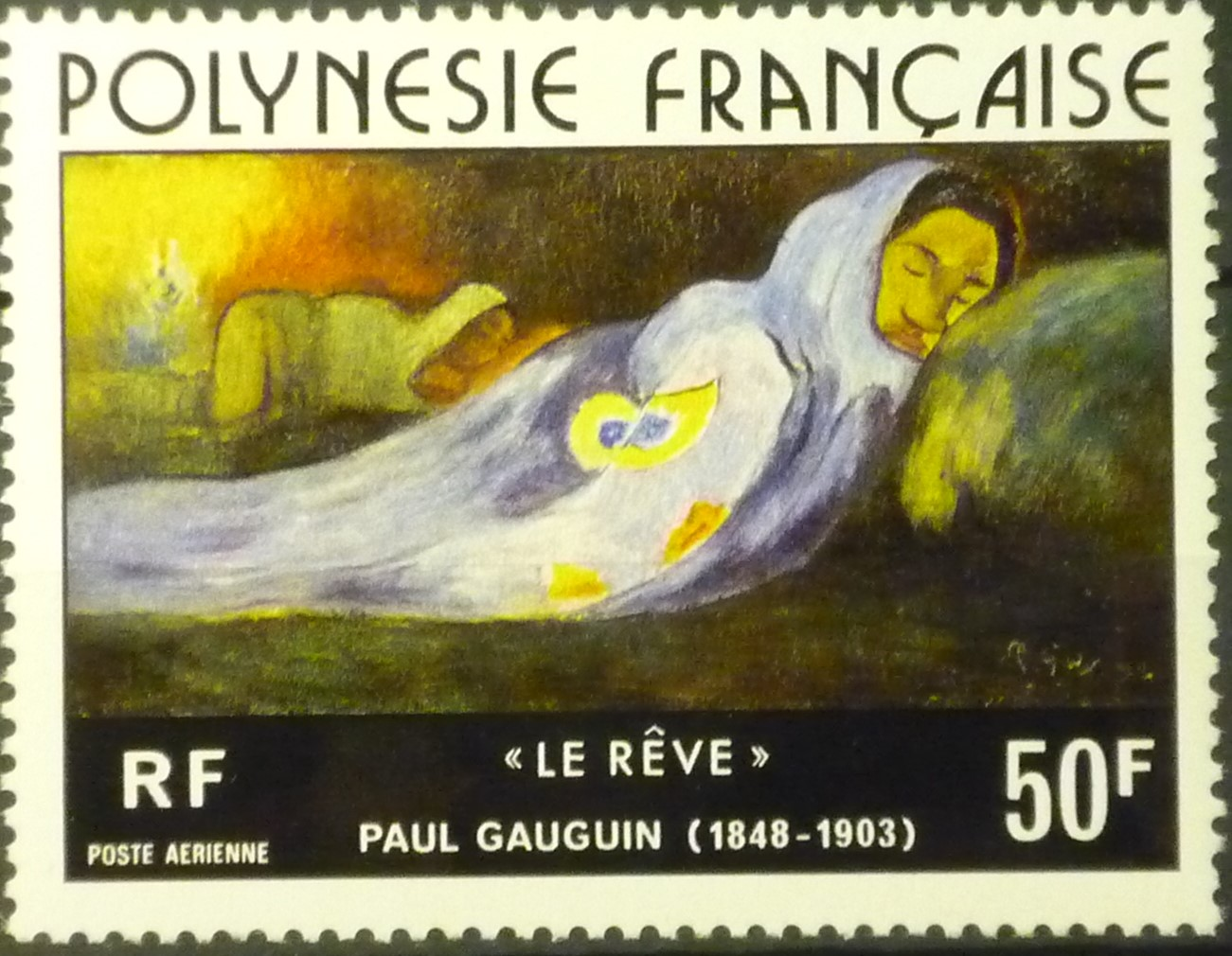
A 1976 stamp of French Polynesia

== See also ==
- Postage stamps of the French Colonies

== References and sources ==
Sources

- Stanley Gibbons Ltd: various catalogues
- Encyclopaedia of Postal Authorities
- Rossiter, Stuart & John Flower. The Stamp Atlas. London: Macdonald, 1986. ISBN 0-356-10862-7
- R. H. Houwink, Stamps and Posts of the French Oceanic Settlements: A Philatelic Study and Guide for the Medium Collector (Zeist, 1951-1952)
- R. H. Houwink, Le timbre et la poste a Tahiti (Paris: Société des Océanistes, [1969])
