= Postage stamps and postal history of Gabon =

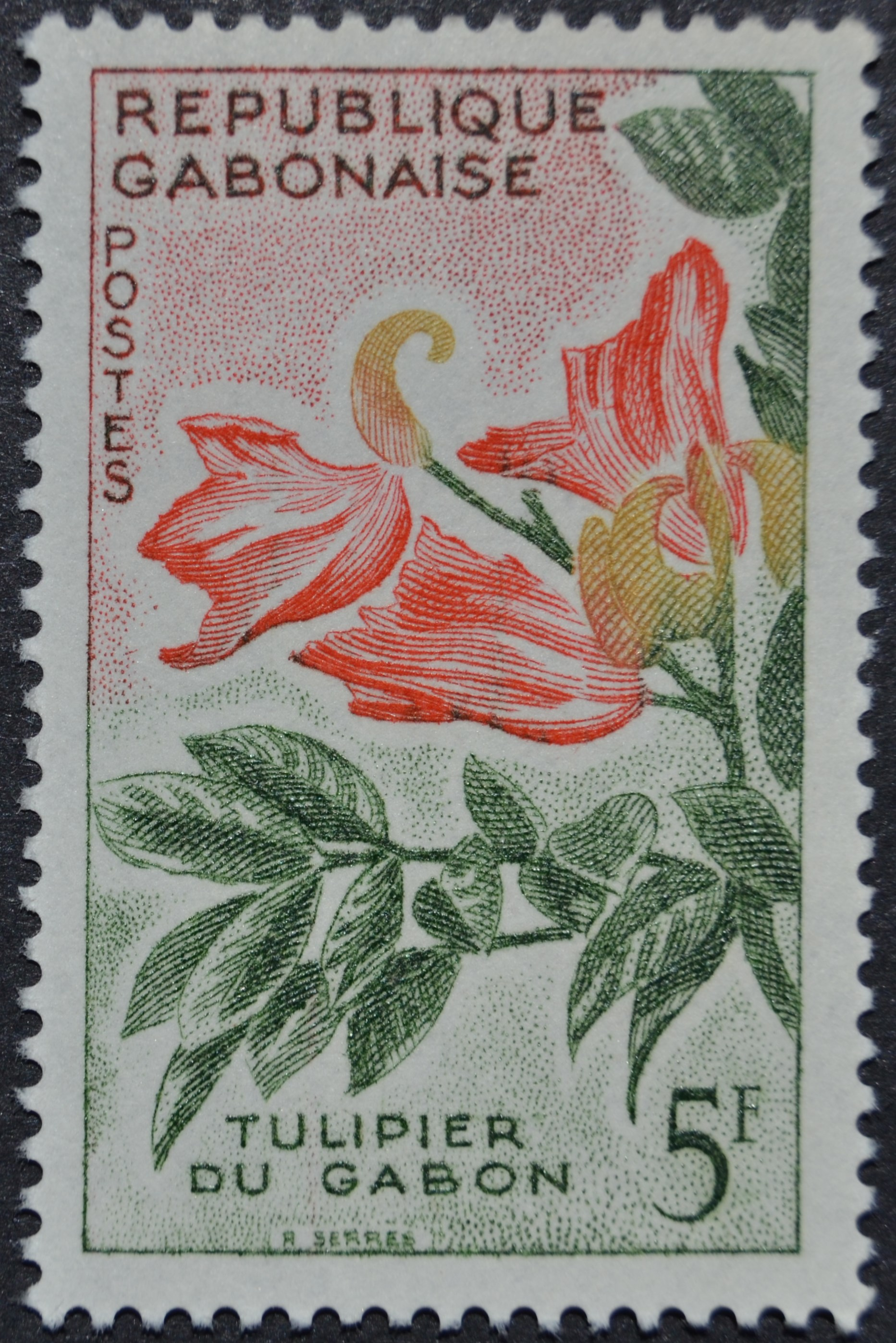
A 1961 stamp of Gabon

Gabon is a country in west central Africa sharing borders with the Gulf of Guinea to the west, Equatorial Guinea to the northwest, and Cameroon to the north, with the Republic of the Congo curving around the east and south. Its size is almost 270,000 km^{2} with an estimated population of 1,500,000. The capital and largest city is Libreville.

== First posts ==
The earliest post office was set up at Libreville in 1862; mail from there was routed through the British post office on Fernando Po (now Bioko). Mail used the stamps of the French Colonies general issue, cancelled with a "GAB" inside a lozenge of dots.

== First stamps ==
On 31 July 1886 Gabon issued its first stamps, which were surcharges on the existing stock, to cover shortages of the most-used values. The overprint consisted of "GAB" in dots, plus the new value. Additional surcharges in 1888 were just the numeral, while in 1889 the postage due stamps were overprinted "GABON / TIMBRE" in addition to the new value, to indicate their validity as regular stamps. Also in 1889 15c and 25c stamps were locally typeset; they were inscribed "Gabon-Congo / POSTES" in one corner, the value in the opposite corner, and a diagonal "Republique Française" across the middle. All of these early issues were produced in small numbers, and not often seen.

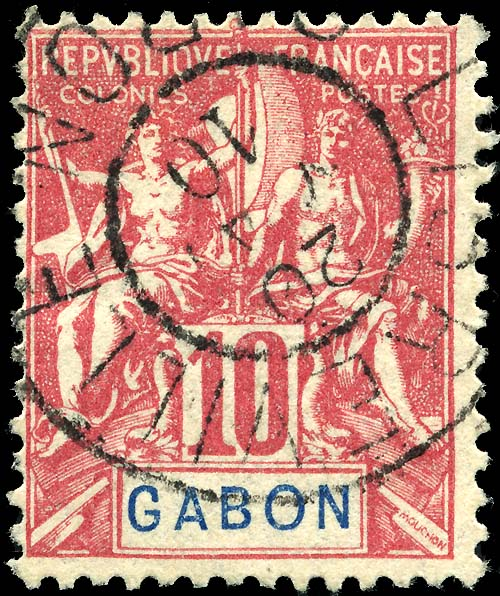
A Navigation and Commerce 10-centime value, cancelled at Libreville in 1910

== French colonial stamps ==
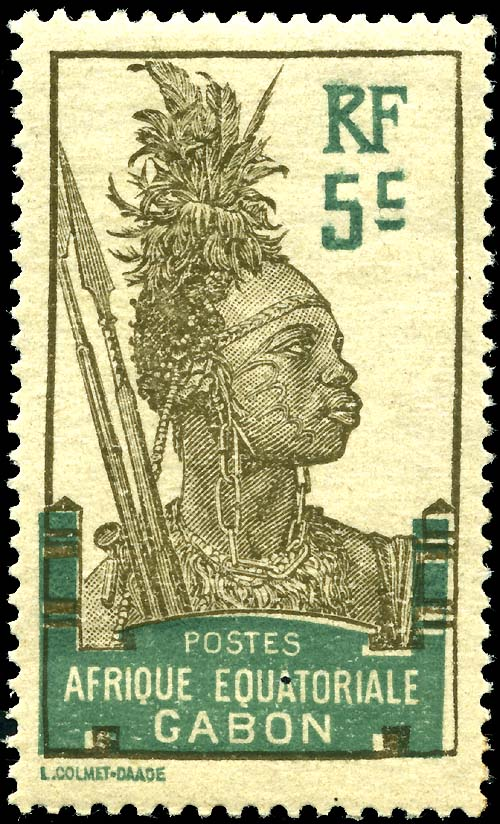
Fang warrior, 5c, 1910

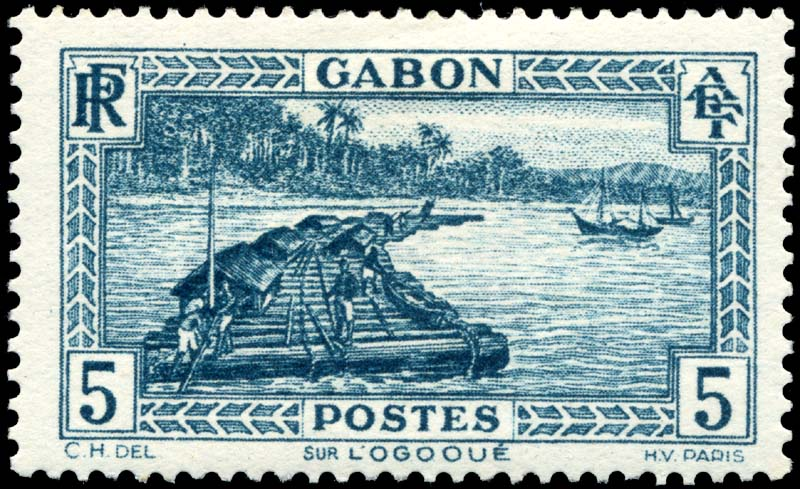
This 1932 5-centime value, showing a timber raft on the Ogooué River, was in use for only a short time.

From 1891 to 1904, Gabon was administered as part of the French Congo, but in connection with a grant of partial autonomy, it issued its own stamps in 1904. These were the stamps of the Navigation and Commerce Issue used by all the French colonies, and included 17 values ranging from 1c to 5fr.

This was followed in 1910 by a set using designs specific to Gabon; a Fang warrior, a view of Libreville, and a Fang woman, all printed in two colors. A first version included "CONGO FRANÇAIS" along with "GABON" in the inscription, but was soon supplanted by a redesign saying "AFRIQUE EQUATORIALE" instead.

As with many other colonies, leftover stamps of the Navigation & Commerce issue were surcharged "5" and "10" in 1912.

From 1924 on, the 1910-series stamps were overprinted "AFRIQUE EQUATORIALE FRANÇAISE", and from 1927 some of these were additionally surcharged with new values.

A new definitive series came out in 1932, comprising 24 values using three designs; a timber raft on the Ogooué River, a portrait of de Brazza, and a view of the village of Setta Kemma. This series was only briefly in use, since Gabon was absorbed into French Equatorial Africa and used its stamps thereafter.

== Independence ==
This cover, sent from Libreville to Chicago in 1965, uses stamps of both the 1961 flower issue and the 1962 M'ba issue.

Although the Republic was proclaimed in November 1958, the people continued to use the stamps of French Equatorial Africa, and the first issue of the Republic came on its 1st anniversary, 28 November 1959, with two values depicting different views of Prime Minister Léon M'ba.

During the 1960s, issues followed a pattern generally common to France and the former French colonies; multicolored engraved stamps in an oblong format, either horizontal or vertical. Some were conscious imitations of French designs, such as the small-format coat of arms stamps that began appearing in 1969 and continuing into the 1980s (long after France itself had stopped using the design). The 1970s saw the gradual appearance of stamps designed primarily to appeal to American and European collectors, such as an issue featuring motorcycles in 1978, and Nobel laureates in 1995, but these have been the exception rather than the rule. In 1965 Gabon issued one of the first gold foil stamps, one honoring Albert Schweitzer.
