= Postage stamps and postal history of French Congo =

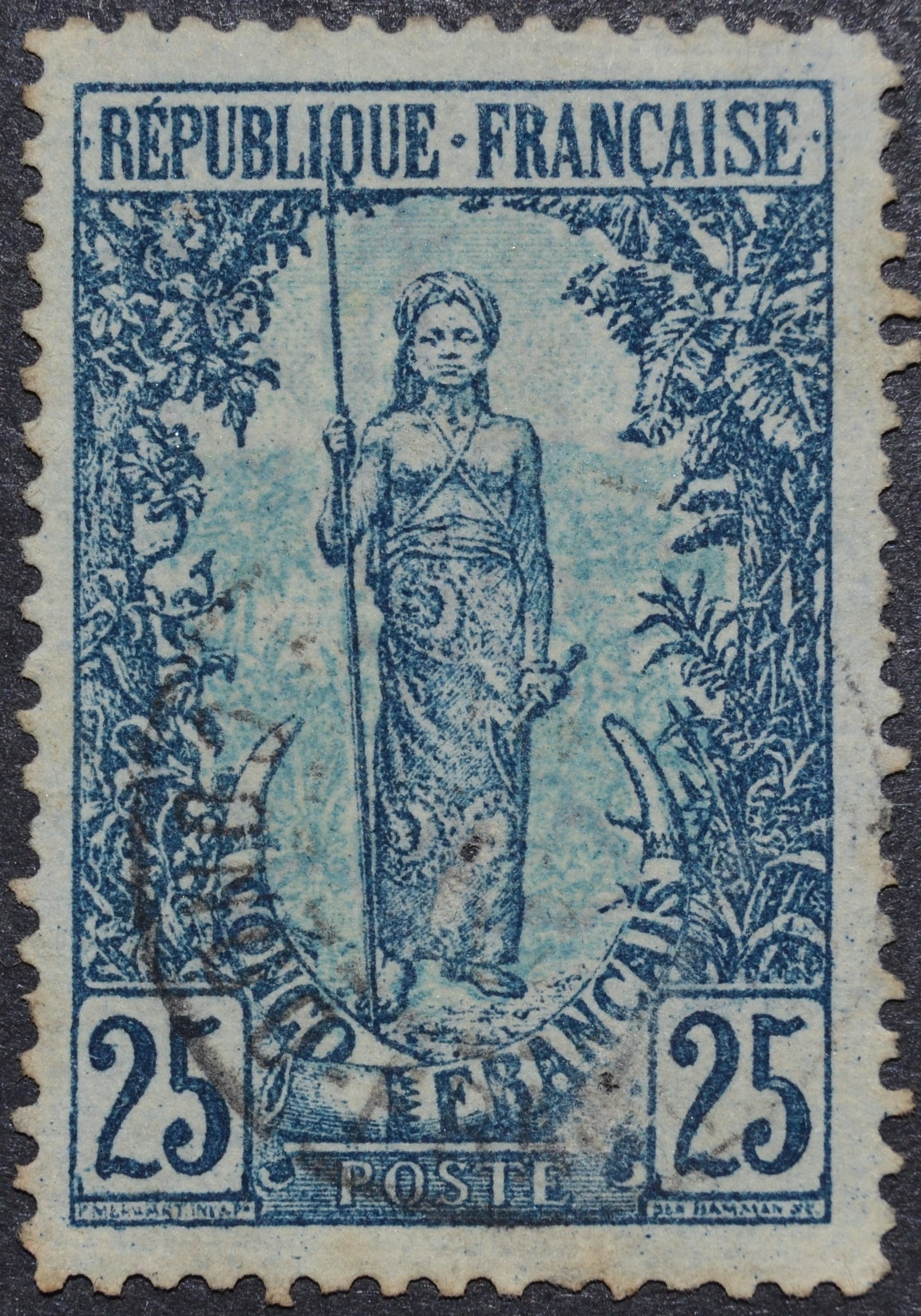
1900 stamp of French Congo

The French Congo was a French colony established in the present-day area of the Republic of the Congo, Gabon, and the Central African Republic. It began in 1880 as a protectorate, and its borders with Cabinda, Cameroons, and the Congo Free State were established by treaties over the next decade. French Congo was temporarily divided between Gabon and Middle Congo in 1906, before being reunited as French Equatorial Africa in 1910 in an attempt to copy the relative success of French West Africa.

The first postage stamps for the colony were overprints issued in 1891 on the generic issue for the French colonies. They read "Congo français" followed by the value; either 5c, 10c, or 15c. In 1892 the omnibus Navigation and Commerce issue included stamps inscribed "CONGO FRANCAIS". A pictorial series followed in 1900; its images included a leopard, Bakalois woman, and a coconut grove, printed in pairs of colors, some rather garish. A couple of provisional surcharges on the Navigation and Commerce stamps proved necessary in 1900, and two more were needed on the pictorials in 1903.

The watermarks of the pictorials of 1900 are unlike any other watermarks used in the French area: they are plant branches, with thistle for the low values (up to 15c), rose for middle values (up to 75c), and an olive branch for the three franc values.

Stamps of French Congo were replaced by the issues of Gabon and Middle Congo in 1904.

== See also ==
- Postage stamps and postal history of the Republic of the Congo
- Postage stamps and postal history of Gabon

== Sources ==
- Stanley Gibbons Ltd: various catalogues
- Encyclopaedia of Postal Authorities
- Rossiter, Stuart & John Flower. The Stamp Atlas. London: Macdonald, 1986. ISBN 0-356-10862-7
