= Postage stamps and postal history of Schleswig-Holstein =

This is a survey of the postage stamps and postal history of Holstein, Schleswig-Holstein, Schleswig and incidentally Lauenberg. Separate stamps were issued for Holstein (1850), Schleswig (1864–1867), Holstein (1864–1866), Schleswig-Holstein (1865) and Schleswig (1920).

== Historical development ==
Schleswig and Holstein have at different times belonged in part or completely to either Denmark or Germany, or have been virtually independent of both nations. From 1460 until 1864, the King of Denmark was both a Danish Duke of Schleswig and a German Duke of Holstein. After the dissolution of the Holy Roman Empire on 6 August 1806, Denmark affirmed its possession of Holstein but did not alter its constitution. Napoleon did not touch either Schleswig or Holstein in 1810 when he annexed the rest of northwestern Germany including the Duchy of Lauenburg. At the Congress of Vienna in 1815, Holstein and Lauenburg became part of the German Confederation, but Schleswig did not. Although Holstein did continue to owe allegiance to the Danish King, in his role as a German duke. The First Schleswig War (1848–1851) was inconclusive, but after the Second Schleswig War of 1864, the Danish King ceded Schleswig to Prussia and Holstein and Lauenburg to Austria. In the Gastein Convention of 14 August 1865, Austria sold Lauenburg to Prussia. Austria lost Holstein to Prussia after the Seven Weeks' War the following year. Lauenburg was an autonomous duchy until 1 July 1876, when it was incorporated into the Royal Prussian Province of Schleswig-Holstein. Denmark only regained northern Schleswig after the plebiscite of 1920.

Postal systems in Schleswig and Holstein developed out of the commercial messenger routes of the Hanseatic League that began to be established in the mid 13th century. In the late 16th century these began to be supplemented in Holstein by those of Thurn und Taxis. While the Danish established their initial postal routes in Schleswig and then in Holstein following the order of King Christian IV of 1624. At its greatest extent the Danish post extended through Holstein to Kiel, Lübeck and Hamburg. Originally run as a commercial monopoly, the Danish post was taken over by the government in 1711.

This early post was carried by ship, or on foot, but Danish postal riders were introduced beginning in 1640.

== First stamps ==
The first stamps were issued by Holstein on 15 November 1850 during its brief autonomy in the First Schleswig War. It issued two stamps a blue one schilling stamp, and a rose two schilling stamp. The stamps featured a double-headed eagle surrounding an embossed center with the initials S and H in the upper two corners, respectively. The lower two corners showed the denomination.

The first Danish stamps for use in the Duchy of Schleswig were introduced on 1 May 1851, and on 15 April 1852 they replaced the previous Holstein stamps and were also authorized for use in use in Lauenburg when Holstein's and Lauenburg's postal services were integrated into the Danish Post. However, Lübeck remained independent with its own postal administration, although the Danish postoffice in Lübeck used Danish stamps beginning on 1 August 1855. Schleswig, Holstein and Lauenburg used Danish stamps until occupied in 1864, and formally detached from Denmark by the Treaty of Vienna signed on 30 October of that year.

== Second Schleswig War and under Prussia and Austria ==
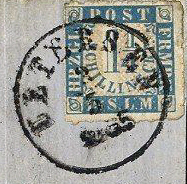
15 May 1864 issue, Michel #7, Scott #18

On 1 March 1864, Holstein, while under occupation by the German Confederation, issued a stamp, denominated 1¼ schillings, in blue and grey, lithographed, imperforate. That same day, the Austrian-Prussian occupying forces in Schleswig issued two stamps inscribed "Herzogth. Schleswig", a 1¼ schilling in green and a four schilling in carmine.

Subsequently, on 15 May, the German Confederation administration issued a second stamp in a new design, in blue with rose hatching, which was also 1¼ schillings and imperforate, but produced typographically.

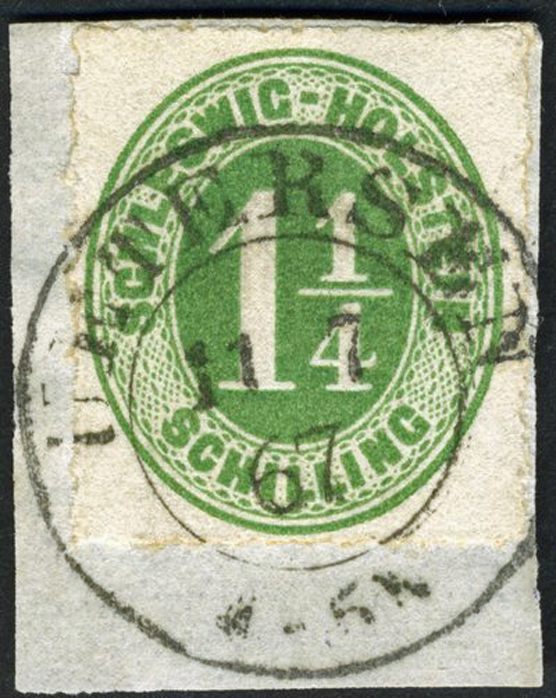
1¼ s. stamp (Scott #4, Michel #9) used in Uetersen, 11 July 1867

Beginning in February 1865, the joint Prussian-Austrian administration issued a set of five stamps for the combined Schleswig-Holstein, similar to the previous year's issue, but inscribed "Schleswig-Holstein". On 1 November 1865, the newly Prussian only administration of Schlewig issued a set of five in the same denominations, but with the "Herzogth. Schleswig" design and in new colors. The Austrian administration in Holstein in turn issued a set of five stamps inscribed "Herzogth. Holstein" on 1 November 1865. The Austrian administration issued two additional members of that set, a 1¼ schilling brown-lilac in February 1866, and a 2 schilling blue in July 1866. On 1 January 1867, the postal systems of Schleswig and Holstein were integrated into the Prussian postal system and placed under the direction of the postmaster in Kiel. One stamp was issued under the Kiel postmaster, similar to the 1¼ schilling Prussian issue of 1965, inscribed "Herzogth. Schleswig", but in a reddish-lilac with purple, and a color variation of grey-lilac with bluegrey.

== North German Postal Union ==
Beginning on 1 January 1868, the North German Postal Union (Norddeutscher Postbezirk) was responsible for the mail in Schleswig, Holstein, Lauenburg and Lübeck. They were in the "Northern District" and the stamp values were in groschen and thalers. These stamps were replaced with the stamps of the German Empire inscribed "Deutsches Reich" in 1872.

== 1920 Slesvig Plebiscites ==
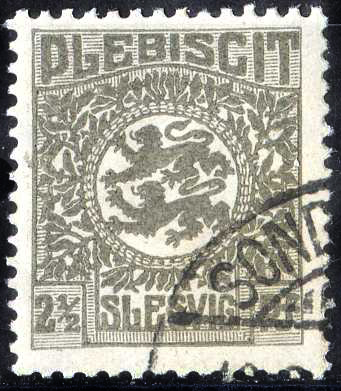
Michel & Scott #1

After World War I, northern and central Schleswig were given the opportunity to vote on whether to become Danish or remain with Germany. During the plebiscite period, special stamps were issued in these areas by the Commission Interalliée Slesvig. A regular sets of definitives were issued on 25 January 1920. It consisted of fourteen stamps denominated in German currency with the first ten displaying the Schleswig coat of arms and the Danish name "Slesvig", and the last four a Schleswig landscape, behind the Schleswig lions, with the Danish name "Slesvig". In addition, the commission issued a set of fourteen official stamps for the use of the commission, namely the initial German currency set overprinted with the commission's initials, "C.I.S.". Furthermore, three postal cards were issued for the definitive and official series, respectively. The plebiscite in the northern zone (Zone 1) was held on 10 February 1920, and voted to return to Denmark, while on 14 March the southern zone (Zone 2) voted to stay with Germany. The first issue of definitive stamps and the series of official stamps were valid in Zone 1 until 27 May; in Zone2 until 23 June. Beginning on 20 May 1920, the commission issued a second set of fourteen definitives, plus two postal cards, that had the same designs, including the Danish name "Slesvig", but were now denominated in Danish currency and overprinted "Zone 1". They were just for use in Zone 1, and were valid from May until 17 July 1920. Danish stamps became valid on 9 July 1920, and subsequently replaced the Zone 1 stamps. The Danish denominated stamps of Schleswig were not issued without the overprint.

The "C.I.S." overprints have been extensively forged, as have postmarks on the Zone 1 stamps. There is great disparity in the literature about the number of Zone 1 stamps that were actually postally used.

== Germany ==
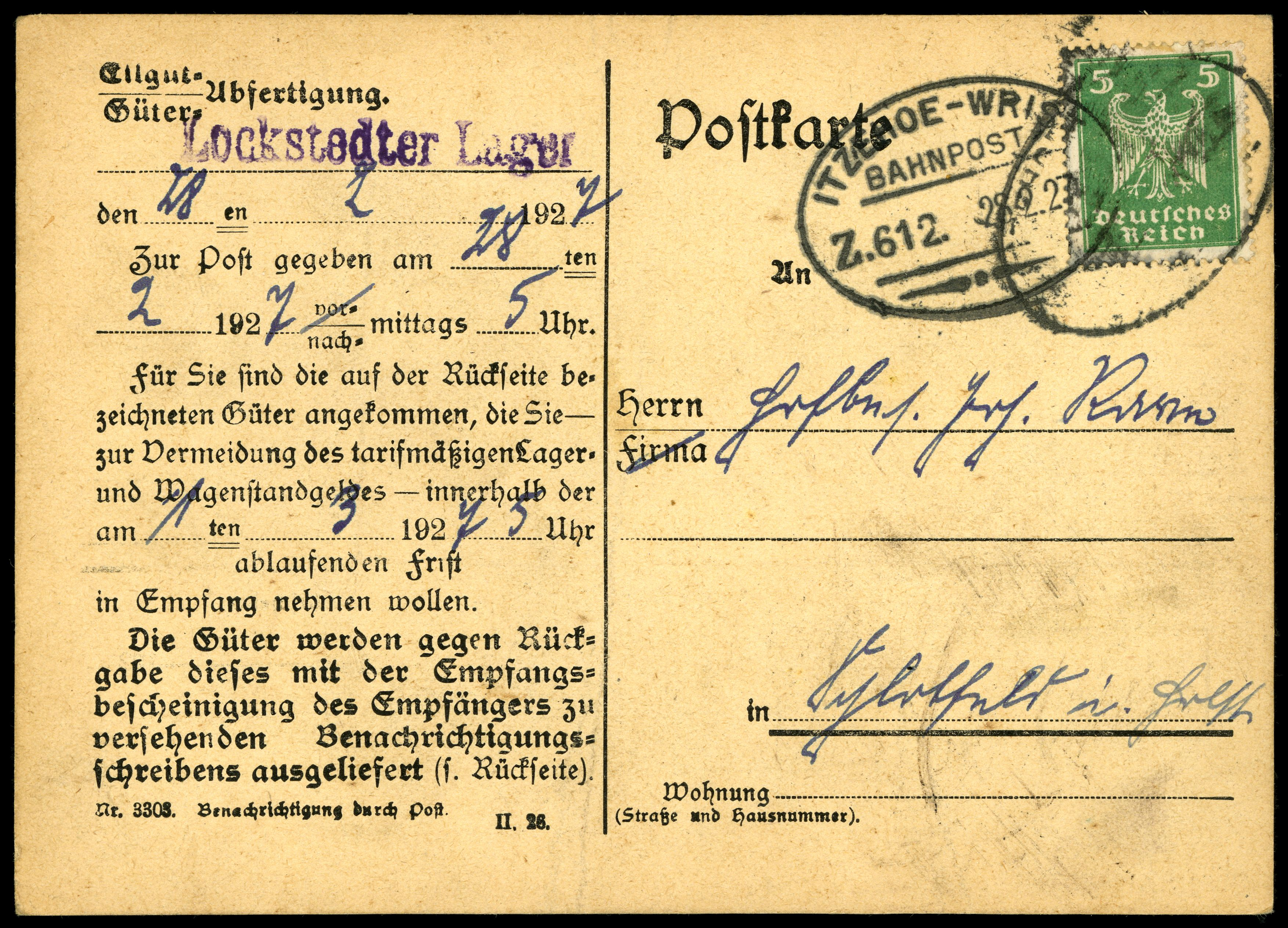
1927 postcard to Lockstedter Lager army camp cancelled in Itzehoe in Holstein

== See also ==
- Postage stamps and postal history of Bergedorf
- Postage stamps and postal history of Hamburg
- Postage stamps and postal history of Heligoland
- Postage stamps and postal history of Lübeck

== Notes and references ==
- Kloetzel, James E.; et al., eds. (2008c). "Schleswig-Holstein". Scott 2009 Standard Postage Stamp Catalogue. Vol. 3 (165th ed.). Sidney, Ohio: Scott Publishing Co. ISBN 978-0-89487-417-8.
- Kloetzel, James E.; et al., eds. (2008e). "Schleswig-Holstein". Scott 2009 Standard Postage Stamp Catalogue. Vol. 5 (165th ed.). Sidney, Ohio: Scott Publishing Co. ISBN 978-0-89487-421-5.
- Michel (2009). "Altdeutschland (Schleswig-Holstein und Laurenburg)". Michel Deutschland Katalog 2009/2010 (in German). Bund Deutscher Philatelisten. ISBN 978-3-87858-044-7.
