= Austro-German Postal Union =

Historical postal union in the German Confederation

The Austro-German Postal Union (Deutsch-Österreichischer Postverein, literally "German–Austrian Postal Association") was a union of the postal systems of the Austrian Empire and the pre-Empire German states. The union was established on 1 July 1850. The administrative prerequisites were already provided by the German Zollverein established in 1834. On 18 October 1847 the representatives convened to the German Postal Conference in Dresden on a suggestion of Prussia and Austria. Not until 6 April 1850, Prussia and Austria, slowed by political circumstances, closed a contract establishing a German–Austrian Postal Association in Berlin.

== History ==
=== Prerequisites ===
Bavaria had printed its first stamps in 1849. Since 1835 there was the first railroad, in 1849 already 6,000 km of rails were laid. The progress took its course. The economic revival of nearly all economic branches called for a well-organised post, which could not be achieved with small states. There was a need for a compact economic region.

The German Zollverein established in 1834 had already provided the administrative prerequisites. Until 1840, 23 countries with more than 80% of the population had confederated under Prussia's leadership by cancelling the customs and trade barriers. Austria wanted to sap the Zollverein by the use of protective duties. Last but not least by the entry of Hannover the Zollverein had become a co-supporter of the Industrial Revolution. A uniform economic region called for a uniform postal system; so the foundation of the German–Austrian Postal Association played an important role.

The diversity of the existing postal systems spanned all parts of the postal laws, the postal monopoly, the postal restraint, the guarantee relations, the special privileges of the postal systems, and the sanctions. Of course it spanned the tariffs for all kinds of consignments, the liberty of postage, the transit relations, the postal delivery, and the treatment of the consignments too. The tabular overview of the existing laws concerning the postal monopoly and the postal restraints in the different German states, which was worked on for the conference, consisted of 7 narrow printed folio pages. Concerning the tariffs there were differences in the tariff formulation, in the single rates, as well as in the tariff grades. In some states the letter tariff consisted of two grades, in other states of thirty grades regarding the distance and the weight. In addition there was the diversity of the mile measures, the coins, and the weights.

- The simple letter weight for example was 1/2 Vienna lot in Austria, 3/4 Prussian lot in Prussia, 1/2 Bavarian lot in Bavaria, 12 1/2 g in Saxony, 3/4 Cologne lot in Hannover, 1/2 - 1 Cologne lot in Württemberg, 3/4 Cologne lot in Baden, 10 g in Luxembourg, 1 Cologne lot in Mecklenburg-Schwerin, 3/4 Cologne lot in Mecklenburg-Strelitz, 1 Cologne lot in Oldenburg, 3/4 - 1 Cologne lot in Holstein and Lauenburg, etc. For a postal consignment that had to pass several regions, all of these differences had to be considered for the calculation of the final postage. Austria suggested a weight of 8.75 g, Prussia 12 g, Bavaria 15.6 g, and Saxony 15 g. They agreed upon 1 lot Vereinsgewicht (association's weight) = 15.6 g excl. In the contract of Postal Association it was virtually kept, but defined as 1/30 of the Zollpfund (customs pound) for each increment of the letter weight.

=== Postal conference ===
Due to these traffic-obstructing conditions the thought of establishing a uniform German postal system arose early. On 18 October 1847, after several vain efforts the representatives of the German postal administrations convened to the German Postal Conference in Dresden on a suggestion of Prussia and Austria, in order to discuss the postal conditions in the German states and to work on the terms of the foundation of a German Postal Association. The negotiations, whose 37 sessions were attended by all representatives of all German postal administrations, lasted until 3 February 1848.

The most urgent task was considered to be the simplification of the letter postage. Bavaria suggested a tariff of 6 Kreuzer for each letter, Austria wanted a three-stage tariff, Prussia wanted even a five-stage one. The Bavarian suggestion appealed most, but it was believed that it could not cover the costs for the postal service, nor by the cheap use of the railroad.

The introduction of a special postal currency as a Postal Association's Coin was considered, but not accomplished. Its unit should have been one Posttaler (postal thaler), equivalent to the 12th part of a Cologne mark fine silver and divided into 100 Kreuzer.

After the political conditions initially had constrained the further accomplishment of this thought, Prussia and Austria resumed negotiations and closed a contract establishing a German–Austrian Postal Association on 6 April 1850 in Berlin.

=== Association ===
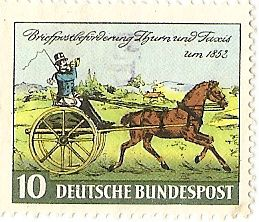
Letter delivery with the Thurn und Taxis post in 1852.

Initially the association was to come to life on 1 May 1850, but the date had to be put off to 1 July 1850. Besides the two founding states the Royal Bavarian Government, the Royal Saxon Government, the Grand Ducal Government of Mecklenburg-Schwerin, the Grand Ducal Government of Mecklenburg-Strelitz, and the Chief Postal Administration of Schleswig-Holstein had already joined. The contract aimed at "die Feststellung gleichmäßiger Bestimmungen für die Taxierung und postalische Behandlung der Brief- und Fahrpost-Sendungen, sowie für die Regulierung der Transit-Verhältnisse nicht nur für die beiderseitigen Landesgebiete, sondern womöglich für das gesamte Deutsche Bundesgebiet" (the declaration of uniform regulations of the rating and postal treatment of letter and driven consignments, as well as of the regulation of the transit-relations not only for the mutual countries, but if possible for the whole German federal territory).

- In 1851 following authorities joined the association:
  - on 1 May the Princely Thurn und Taxis Postal Administration and the Grand Ducal Government of Baden,
  - on 1 June the Royal Government of Hannover,
  - on 1 September the Royal Government of Württemberg,
  - on 1 October the Electorate of Hesse, the Duchy of Nassau, and
  - on 1 December the Free Hanseatic City of Bremen.
- On 1 January 1852 the Grand Ducal Government of Luxembourg, the Duchy of Braunschweig, the Free Hanseatic City of Lübeck, and the Grand Ducal Government of Oldenburg further joined the postal association.

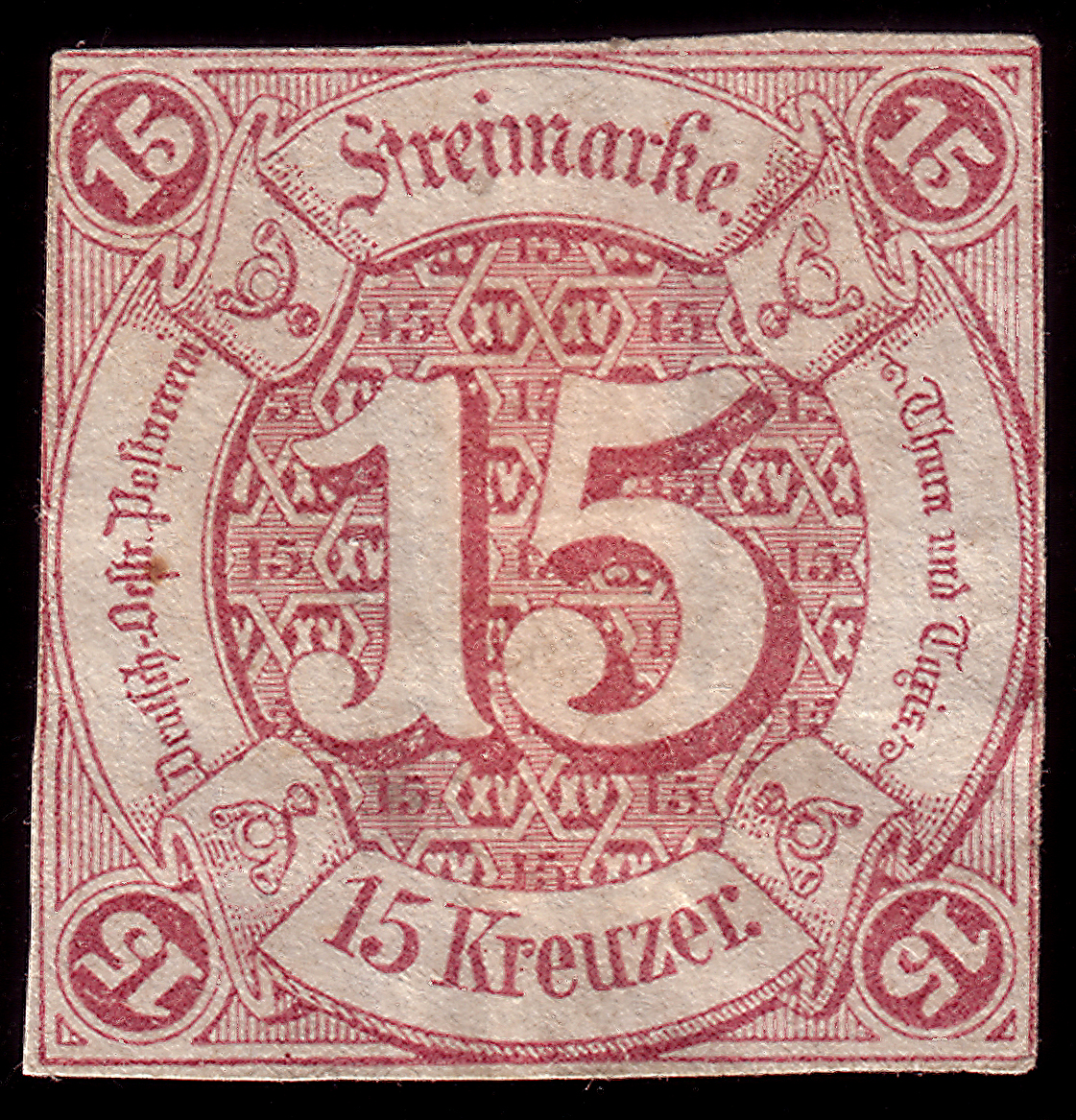
Thurn und Taxis stamp of 1859

The postal association only was an unseparated postal region for correspondence. For letters, printed matters (Kreuzbandsendungen), test samples and examples, as well as postally delivered newspapers collective postage fees were levied in the association's (mutual) traffic. Concerning letters, test samples and examples its amount complied with the weight of the consignment and the distance from the place of posting to the place of destination, measured in a straight line. Each postal administration had to receive the fees of the letters, that were sent from their post offices, in mutual traffic. In fact the contract provided the freedom for passing, but not that it should be free of charge. The acquisition of the remuneration of the passing letter-post, which was entitled to the individual postal administrations, was especially regulated by the contract. For the freedom to collect postage, regulations were provided. In article 7 of the contract the expression "Wechselverkehr der Postvereinsstaaten" (mutual traffic of the postal association's states) appeared for the first time.

Heinrich von Stephan wrote:

Especially regarding the faster delivery and the simplification of postage, both in the association's region and in the transit of letters delivered through Germany. For example in the Netherlands a letter to Alexandria had to pay 22 Kreuzer Prussian and 12 Kreuzer Austrian transit postage, thus together 34 Kreuzer, currently a total of 9 Kreuzer for the same distance from Emmerich to Triest, the progressions concerning the weight not included.

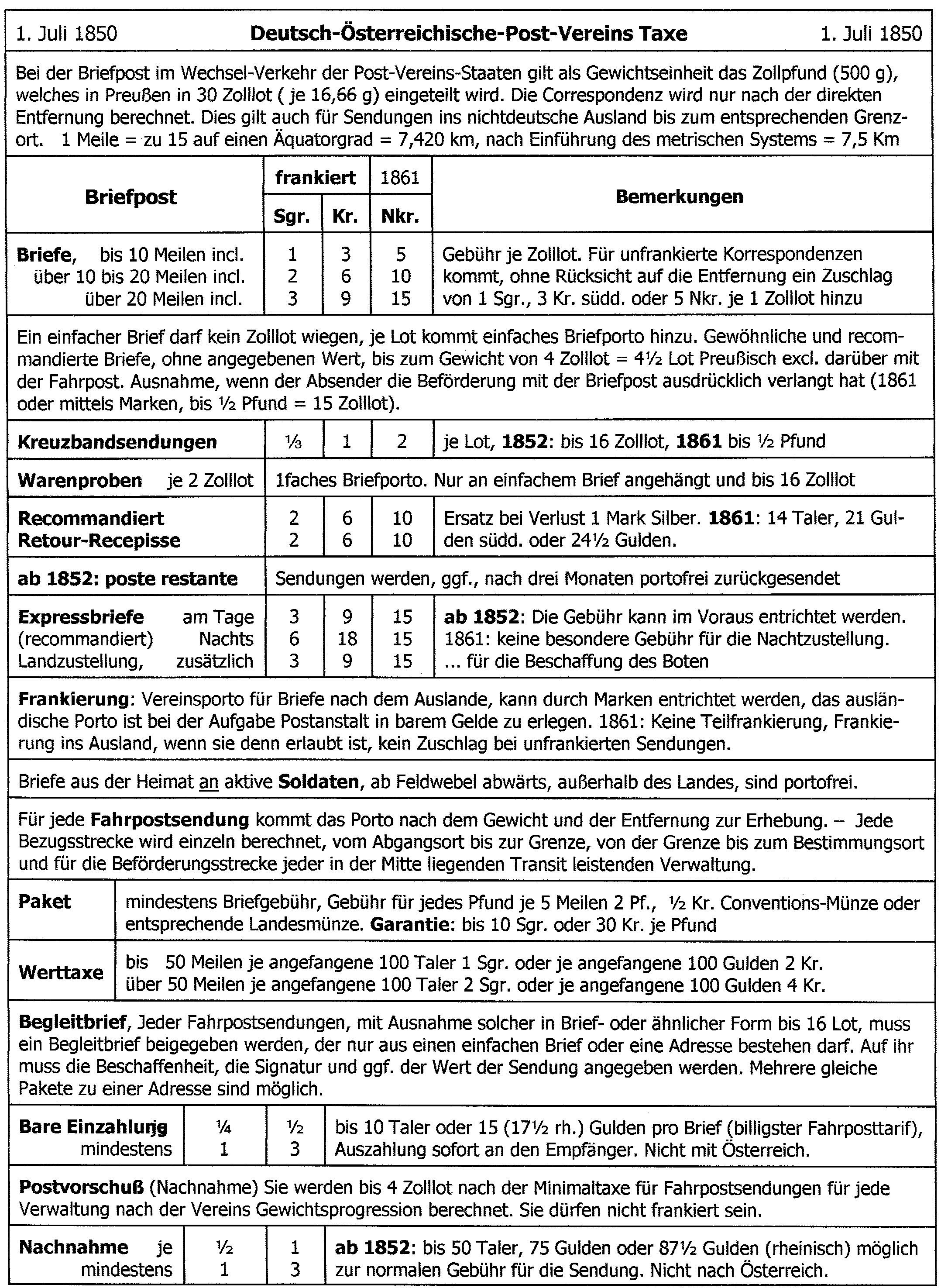
1850 – letter tariffs of the German-Austrian Postal Association

The letter tariff applied to the whole association's region. An exception was provided: "For the letter delivery between two places, for which currently a lower postage exists, this postage can further be applied after agreement of the involved postal administrations." Regarding the Kreuzer-tax the Conventionsmünze or Reich currency depending on the state's currency was levied. This regulation endured after the introduction of a new coin currency too, on 2 October 1858, Austria introduced the Neukreuzer.

- The correspondences of all members of the regent's families of the association's states were delivered free of postage in the whole association's region. Further correspondences concerning mere civil services and the official correspondences of the postal administrations and post offices were delivered free of postage too.
- No new postage was charged for the returning or forwarding delivery of a letter.
- Besides the taxes from the table new taxes might not be levied; they are allowed only for the order fee. The remuneration of cash disbursements for extraordinary services (e.g. ordering by an express messenger) is not excluded.
- The correspondence with foreign countries is subject of the same treatment as the association's correspondence. The additional postage for unstamped letters are not applied.

For parcels the value declaration was only necessary for consignment of valuables. The refund for a lost simple parcel was set at 10 Silbergroschen or 30 Kreuzer per pound. The postage was 2 Pfennig per pound, the minimum was the letter postage. For the mutual handover of the driving post the postage was calculated concerning the distances between the postal borders and between the places of posting and destination. For the rating of the driving post consignments border points were arranged, to and from which the calculation and acquisition of the postage mutually was performed. So, a minimum of two distances were added. For the calculation of the postage of transit consignments of several transit routes, the number of miles had to be reduced to average distances.

For each driving post consignment the postage was calculated concerning the weight, the postage of value was only charged, if the consignment was declared by the means of value. For each rating-route the minimum of weight-postage was considered to be the letter postage. All consignments, for which a higher postage was calculated due to the application of the weight-tariff, it should be charged: for each pound per every 5 miles [8.0 km] 1/2 Kreuzer or 2 Silberpfennig or the respective value in the country's currency. But for heavy letters the respective postage has to be charged according to the letter or driving post tariff. It is optional mailing the consignments unstamped or completely stamping them for the place of destination. The postage acquisition is especially calculated regarding the above-mentioned tariff regulations for the delivery route of each individual administration. Returning and forwarding consignments are subject of the taxes for the delivery route for the way forth and back.

For consignments of valuables it should be charged: up to a distance of 50 miles [80 km] for every 100 Gulden 2 Kr. and for every 100 Taler 1 Sgr., more than 50 miles [80 km] for every 100 Gulden 4 Kr. and for every 100 Taler 2 Sgr., with the annotation that for lower values the tax for the full hundred should be charged. The addressee can declare the value of the consignment himself. A refund is provided according to the declared value. For other parcels a maximum of 10 Sgr. resp. 30 Kr. per pound were refunded. "The current agreement comes to live on 1 July 1850. It stays effective until the end of 1860 and from then on with a reservation of a year's notice."

=== Revised contract ===
The first conference took place in 1851 in Berlin where, on 5 December 1851, the revised Postal Association's contract was signed by Austria, Prussia, Bavaria, Sachsen, Hannover, Württemberg, Baden, Holstein, Luxemburg, Braunschweig, Mecklenburg-Schwerin, Mecklenburg-Strelitz, Oldenburg, Lübeck, Hamburg, and the Thurn und Taxis postal administration. The "Deutsche Posterein" (German Postal Union), as it was called since then, did not include the driving post.

Notable regulations of that contract are:

- Guarantee of the freedom of passing for letter consignments with moderate passing reimbursements;
- introduction of a uniform letter postage graded according to three distances;
- postage reduction for printed matters and commercial samples;
- postage charging by definitive stamps;
- mediation of newspaper orders;
- perpetuation of the political borders concerning the driving post, actually parcels, in that way, that a special postage was still charged for each postal region.

=== First addendum to the revised contract ===
In 1855, one further conference took place in Vienna. There, the association's rules were agreed upon. Things, whose transport is dangerous, were excluded. The addendum regulates the transit fees, the delivery of the letter post, and tells, what has to be done with unstamped or insufficiently stamped letters. It also regulates the guarantees for registered mail, parcels, consignments with stated value, and many more.
