= Postage stamps and postal history of Lübeck =

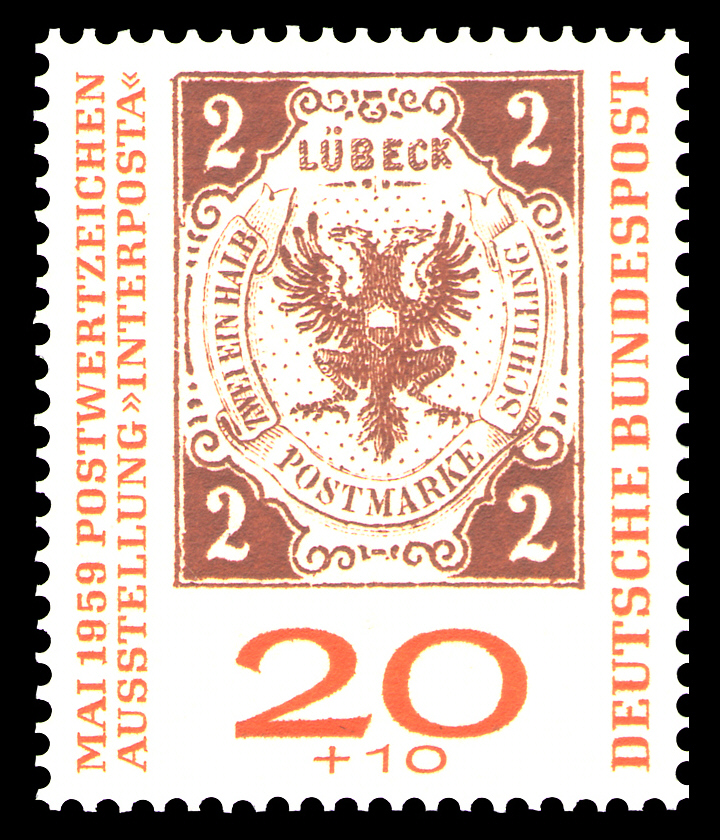
Lübecke postage stamp as a motif of the German Post Office

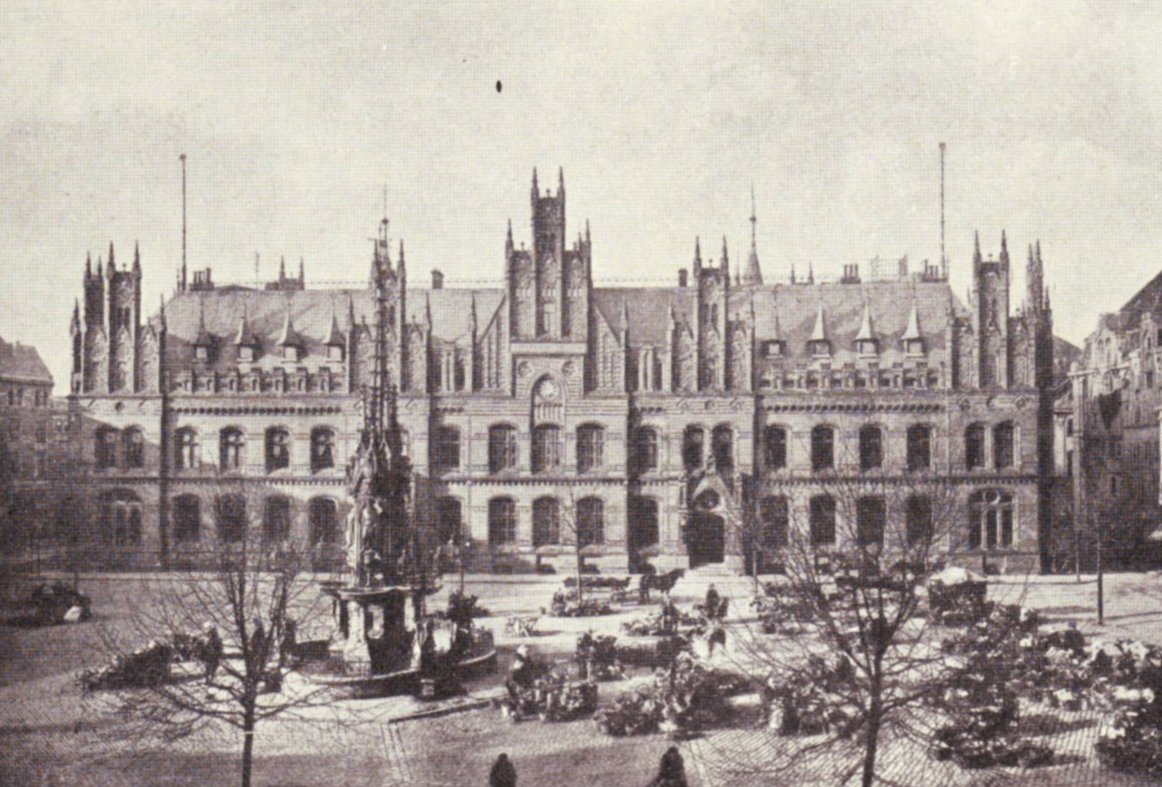
Imperial German Post Office at the Lübeck Market (1900)

Soon after the German Hanseatic League (1241) was founded, regulated messenger routes were developed. In the Free Imperial City of Lübeck, the conveyance of correspondence by letter was supervised by the mercantile council of the Scania Market (Schonenfahrer), which also appointed the messenger master (postmaster) and the remainder of the personnel.

Around 1579, the Imperial Post of Thurn und Taxis arrived in Lübeck. It existed beside the Hanseatic post, which led to minor tensions. In 1683, they were joined by the post offices of Platen, later Electoral Hanover (until 1844), and Wismar. Together with the Danish post, these were merged into the Schütting-post.

During the French imperial era, Napoleon united the three Hanseatic cities and northwestern Germany with the First French Empire under the name Bouches-de-l'Elbe by the decree of 13 December 1810. It was the era of the Continental System against the United Kingdom of Great Britain and Ireland.

The Scanian merchants took over the postal system again. However the postal administration now worked for the city treasury (Schütting). The Scanian merchants received an annual payment of 2,000 Lübeck Courantmarks. In the Bi-Urban Condominium, since 1420 under Hamburg's and Lübeck's shared rule, the Beiderstädtisches Postamt (Bi-Urban Mail) started its postal services on 1 April 1847.

In 1848 apart from the city post office, there were a Taxis letter post, riding and errant posts of Mecklenburg-Strelitz, Royal Hanover (until 1845), and Denmark, as well as a Prussian post office.

When the job of a deputy of the postal department had to be newly filled, the choice was made for the Mecklenburg-Strelitz grand ducal postmaster Carl Hermann Lebrecht Lingnau, who received the title of postal director on 1 April 1851. The lower officials were called the "Litzenbrüder".

At the postal conference of the Austro-German Postal Union in Berlin (1851), a treaty between Lübeck and Thurn und Taxis was signed with effect of 1 January 1852, which exactly established the responsibilities. The Danish post was dealt with in a similar way. The construction of the Lübeck-Büchen Railway through Danish-ruled Saxe-Lauenburg was permitted and in return, the Royal Danish Chief Post Office was allowed in Lübeck.

During the transition of the postal administration to the North German Confederation on 1 January 1868, the city post office became the chief post office of the North German postal district and Mr. Lingnau became chief postal director. The Danish post office, as well as Thurn und Taxis, closed their posts. There were two stable post offices and seven letter collections in Lübeck for 50,339 inhabitants. The currency was the Lübeck Courant = 16 Shilling, where 1 shilling was equivalent to 2 Sechsling.

== Stamps ==
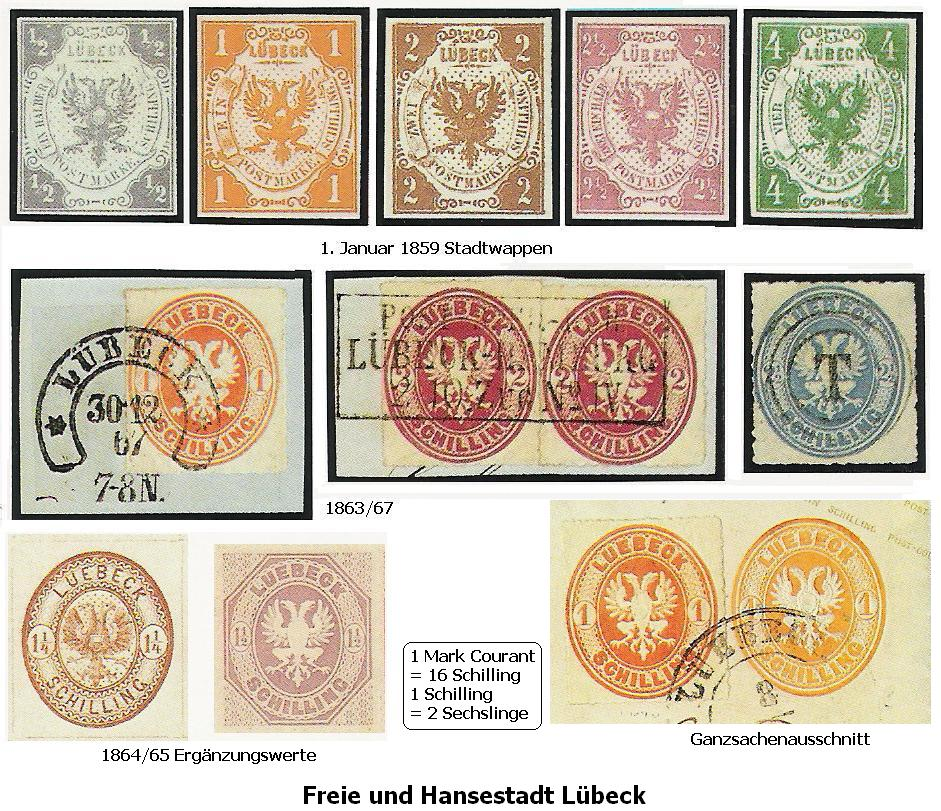
Stamps of Lübeck

Stamps were introduced on 1 January 1859. They depicted a double-headed eagle with outstretched wings, Lübeck's coat of arms. A ribbon which surrounds the eagle contains the word "Postmarke" (postage stamp) and the indication of the value of the stamp spelled out in letters. On the upper side is the word "Lübeck" and in each of the four corners is a number which indicates the value of the stamp. The stamps from 1863 depict the same eagle in an oval and in relief, with the word "Lübeck" at the top, the indication of value at the sides, and the word "Schilling" at the bottom. The configuration and value the postal stationaries were the same as the stamps.

== Literature ==
- B. E. Crole: Geschichte der Deutschen Post. 2nd edition. Publishing house W. Malende in Leipzig, Leipzig 1889. The author is Bruno Emil König from Berlin.
- Wilhelm Kähler: "Die Lübecker Briefmarken." In: Der Wagen, 1960, pp. 56–59.
