= Postage stamps and postal history of Anguilla =

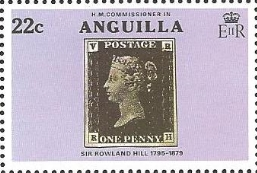
A 1979 stamp of Anguilla

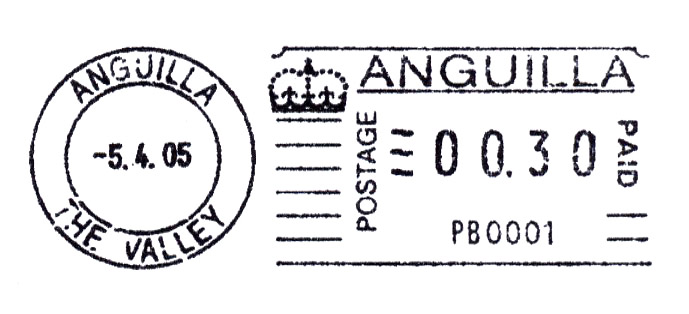
A meter stamp from Anguilla

Anguilla is a British overseas territory in the Caribbean, one of the most northerly of the Leeward Islands in the Lesser Antilles. It consists of the main island of Anguilla itself, together with a number of much smaller islands and cays with no permanent population.

== First stamps ==
Anguilla has produced its own stamps since 1967. It was formerly part of St. Kitts and Nevis and the islands were granted Associated Statehood on February 27, 1967. Its first stamps in 1967 were those of St. Kitts-Nevis but opted with Independent Anguilla. However, owing to limited stocks available for overprinting, the sale of the stamps was controlled by the Postmaster, and no orders from the trade were accepted. Later in 1967 it produced the first stamps without overprints and displayed notable sites in Anguilla such as Sombrero Lighthouse etc.

== Later issues ==
In 1968 several issues were produced, Anguilla Ships, Anguillan Birds, the 35th Anniversary of the Anguillan Girl Guides and a Christmas issue. In 1969 the first issue celebrated the Anguillan salt industry, but on July 7, 1969, the Anguillan post office was officially recognised by the government of St. Kitts-Nevis and they issued an official independence issue in January 1969.

== External lists ==
- The first issues of Anguilla.
- Anguilla Philatelical Resources in the web
