= Italian post in Saseno =

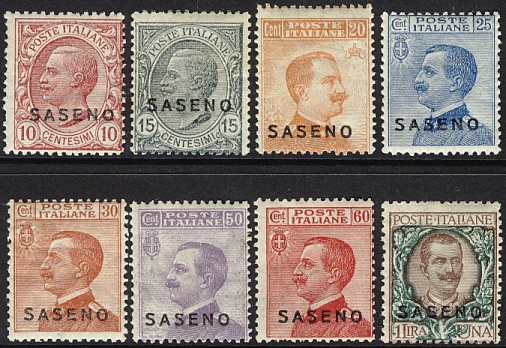
The full set of eight Italian stamps overprinted for Saseno in 1923.

Saseno is the Italian name for Sazan Island (Albanian definite form: Sazani; Italian: Saseno) which is a small island strategically located between the Strait of Otranto and the entrance to the Bay of Vlorë in Albania.

== Historical background ==
After the end of the Second Balkan War in 1913, Italy and Austria-Hungary pressed Greece to evacuate the southern part of modern Albania. Finding the island too unimportant to risk war with Italy, Greece evacuated it and it was in turn occupied by Italy on 30 October 1914. Italy posted a military commander on the island. This was later ratified on 26 April 1915 by the secret Treaty of London.

After World War I, Albania formally ceded the island to Italy on 2 September 1920 as part of the Albano-Italian protocol. The island remained part of Italy from 1920 until 1947 when it was returned to Albania.

== Italian postage ==
During most of this period, postage stamps of Italy were in use. However, in 1923, eight contemporary stamps of Italy were overprinted "SASENO" by the Sazan Island post office for local use. These are all definitive types which show a portrait of King Victor Emmanuel III of Italy and are denominated in the Italian currency of 100 centesimi (c.) to one lira with values of 10c., 15c., 20c., 25c., 30c., 50c., 60c. and 1 lira. The values have individual colouring, mainly using shades of orange, brown and blue.

The eight stamps are not particularly rare, although uses of the stamps on covers are uncommon.

== References and sources ==
Sources

- Rossiter, Stuart & John Flower. The Stamp Atlas. London: Macdonald, 1986. ISBN 0-356-10862-7
- XLCR Stamp Finder and Collector's Dictionary, Thomas Cliffe Ltd, c.1960
