= Postage stamps and postal history of Cambodia =

Cambodia used the postage stamps of Indochina until the early 1950s. In 1949 Cambodia became an associated state of the French Union but gained independence in 1953 and left the Union in 1955.

== First stamps ==
The first stamps were issued in 1951 for the kingdom of Cambodia, Royaume du Cambodge, as a self-governing state within the French Union. One of the stamps depicted King Norodom Sihanouk. Cambodia gained independence on 9 November 1953.

== Khmer Republic ==
The Khmer Republic was declared on 9 October 1970. Stamps inscribed Republique Khmere were issued from 1971 to 1975.

== Democratic Kampuchea ==
The National United Front of Kampuchea took over Cambodia in 1975 and established Democratic Kampuchea. The new regime allowed no civilian private communication and so abolished the postal system.

Service resumed in early 1979 when the Vietnam People's Army drove the Khmer Rouge out of the capital Phnom Penh.

== People's Republic of Kampuchea ==
April 1980 saw the first set of postage stamps issued after the establishment of the People's Republic of Kampuchea. In 1989, the name of "People's Republic of Kampuchea" was changed to the State of Cambodia.

Following the 1991 Paris Peace Accords, Cambodia was governed briefly by a United Nations mission from 1992 to 1993.

== Kingdom of Cambodia ==
In 1993, the Kingdom of Cambodia was restored as a constitutional monarchy.

== See also ==
- Postage stamps and postal history of Indochina
