= Postage stamps and postal history of Liberia =

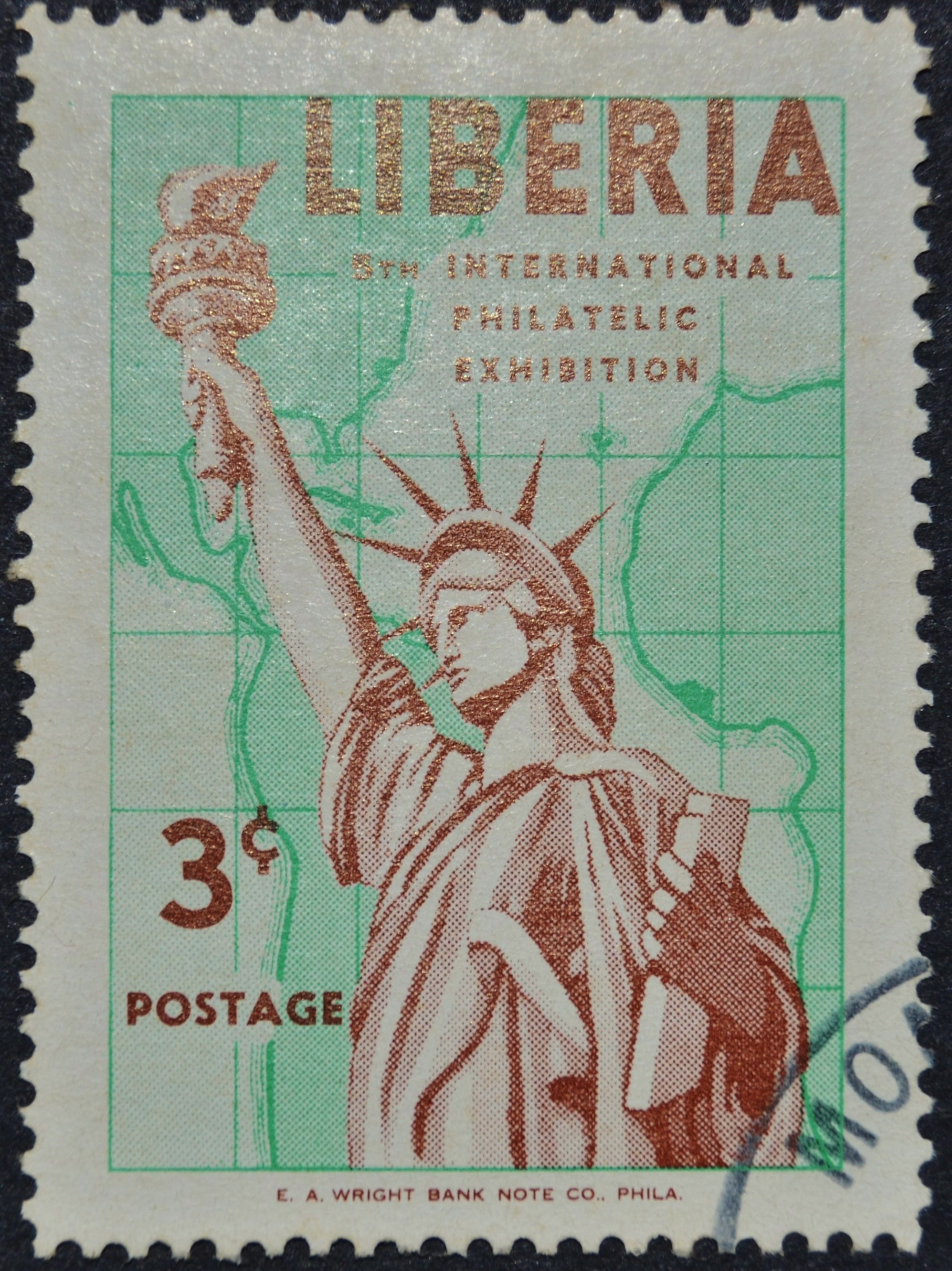
A 1956 stamp marking FIPEX in New York

This is a survey of the postage stamps and postal history of Liberia.

Liberia is a country on the west coast of Africa, bordered by Sierra Leone, Guinea, Côte d'Ivoire, and the Atlantic Ocean. The capital is Monrovia.

== First stamps ==
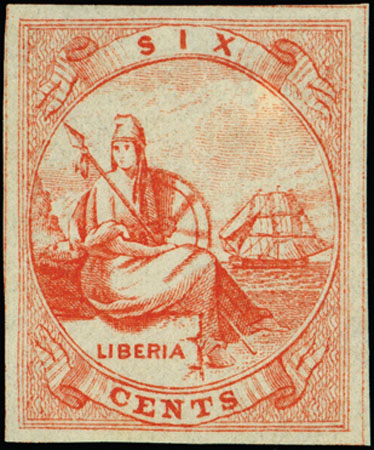
An 1864 stamp depicting Liberty

Began as a settlement of the American Colonization Society (ACS), Liberia declared its independence on July 26, 1847. The first stamps of Liberia were issued in 1860, depicting a sitting Liberty with a sailing vessel in the background.

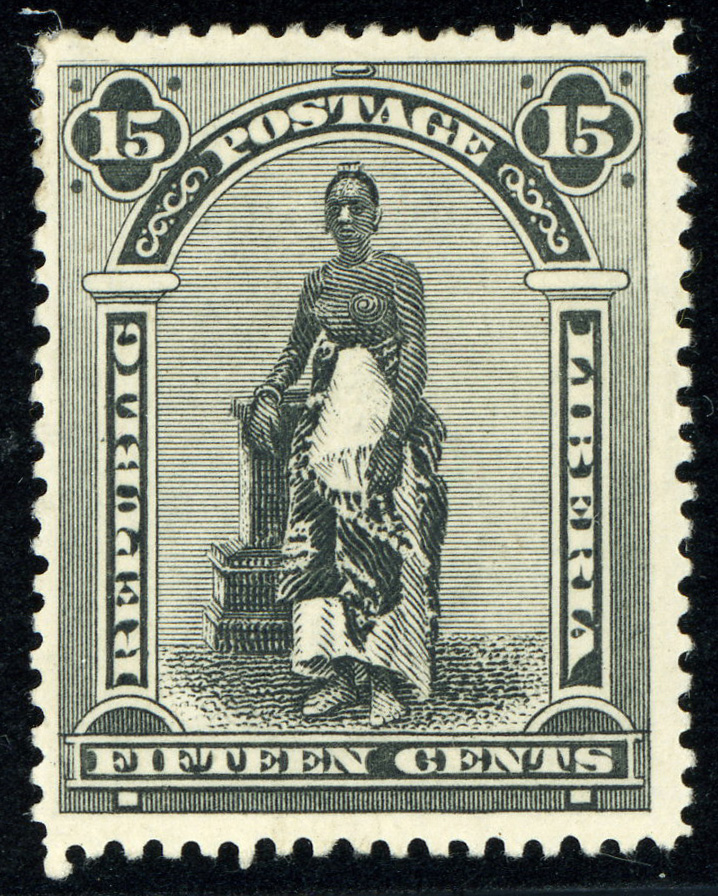
A 15 cents stamp featuring Vai woman, 1892

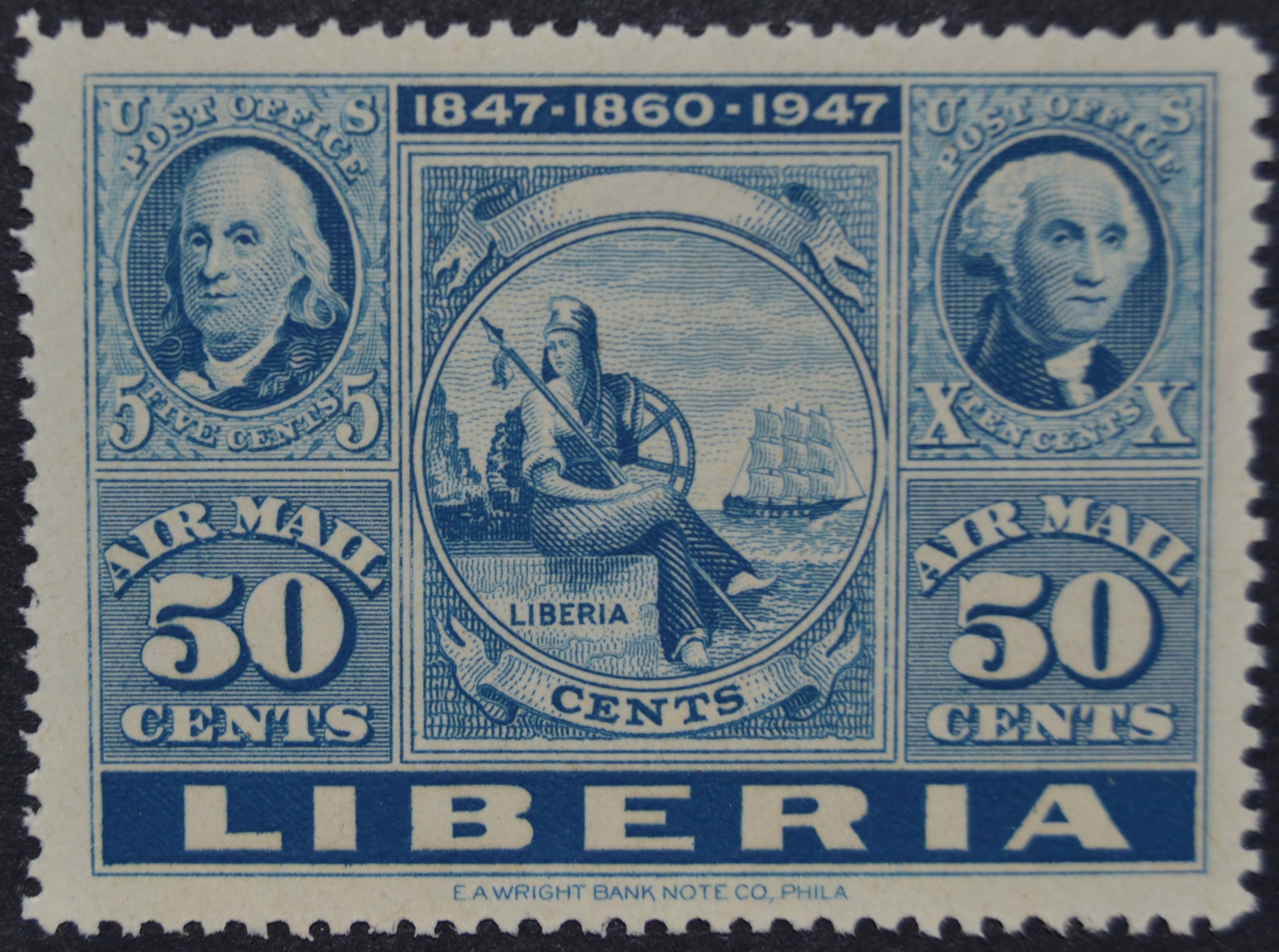
A 1947 stamp of Liberia commemorating the centenary of the first United States postage stamp and CIPEX
