= Postage stamps and postal history of Karelia =

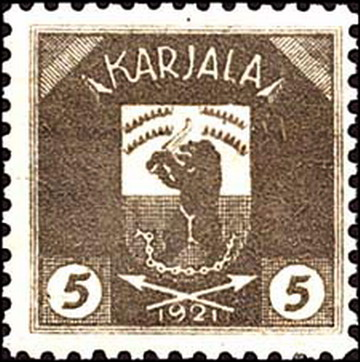
A 1922 stamp of issued during the East Karelian Uprising

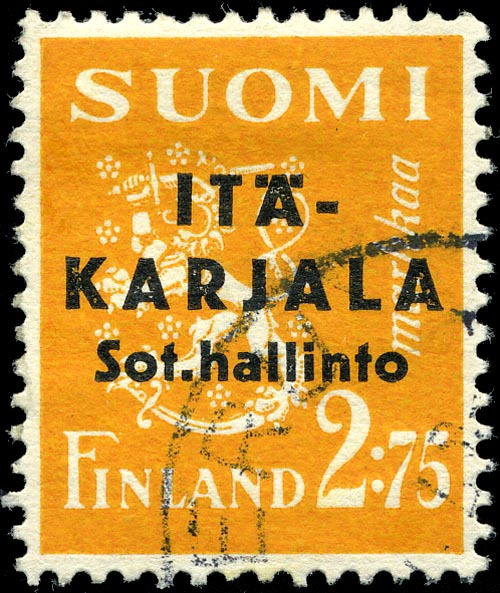
A 2.75 markka stamp of 1941

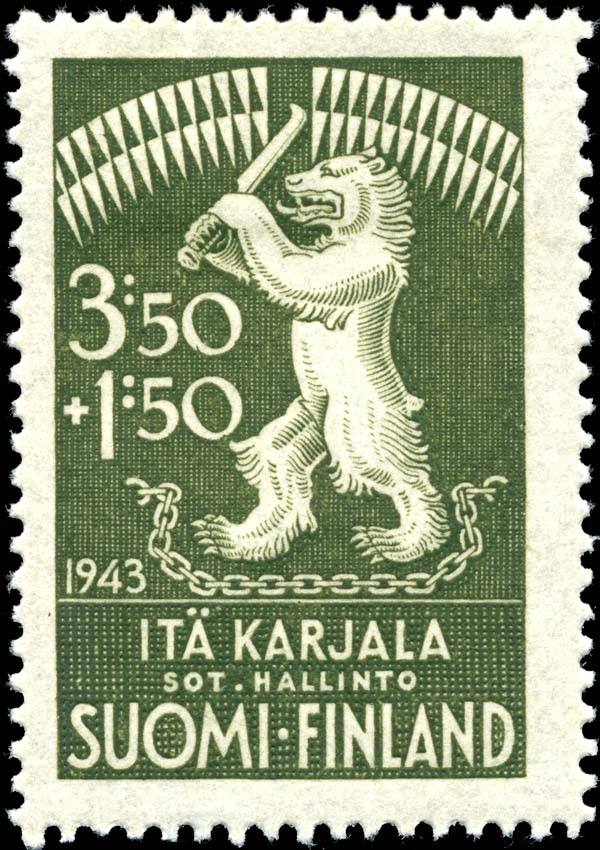
A semi-postal stamp of 1943

Karelia has appeared in philately several times; first as a breakaway republic from Soviet Russia in 1922, later when Eastern Karelia was occupied by Finland during the Continuation War of 1941 to 1944, and in the post-Soviet period when provisional stamps and cinderellas were issued. Additionally, there were Zemstvo stamps used in the early 20th century on the territory of the contemporary Republic of Karelia.

== 1922 ==
In connection with the offensive of the Red Army in June 1920, the anti-Bolshevik government moved to the village of Voknavolok and further to Finland. In fact, lost control of North Karelia in late June 1920.

During the 1922 rebellion, the Karelians issued a set of 15 postage stamps, with values from 5 pennia to 25 markka, all using the same design of a bear surmounted by the inscription "KARJALA". The lower values were printed in one color, while the 1-markka and up were bi-colored.

They were only valid from 31 January to 16 February 1922, and thus genuinely-used copies are uncommon, today commanding prices 5-10 more than mint copies. Counterfeits exist in large numbers.

== 1941-44 ==
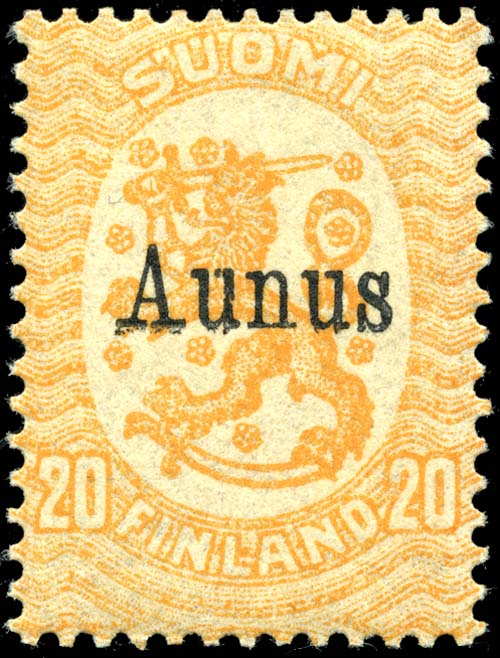
A stamp issued by Finland during the 1919 Aunus expedition

When Finland occupied Eastern Karelia in 1941, the military administration issued stamps of Finland overprinted "ITÄ- / KARJALA / Sot.hallinto", for "East Karelia Military Administration". Two different typefaces were used. In 1942, Finland's Mannerheim stamps were overprinted similarly.

The only stamp to be designed for the occupation was also its last; a semi-postal stamp issued in 1943. It depicts the arms of the territory, and the surcharge of 1.50 markka went to aid war victims.

The stamps of the occupation saw limited use, and genuine used are today worth about twice as much as unused copies. None are especially rare.

== 1919 Aunus expedition issues ==
Stamps were issued by Finland during the 1919 Aunus expedition by overprinting "Aunus" on stamps of Finland.

== See also ==
- Postage stamps and postal history of Finland

== Sources ==
- Stanley Gibbons Ltd: various catalogues
- Encyclopaedia of Postal Authorities
- Rossiter, Stuart & John Flower. The Stamp Atlas. London: Macdonald, 1986. ISBN 0-356-10862-7
- AskPhil – Glossary of Stamp Collecting Terms
- Russia Zemstvos (taken from the catalogue by F.G. Chuchin)
