= Printed matter =

Printed matter is a term, mostly used by mailing systems, normally used to describe mechanically printed materials for which reduced fees are paid which are lower than first-class mail. Each postal administration has its own rules for what may be posted as printed matter. In the Great Britain a special "Book Post" was introduced in 1848 that by 1852 had been extended to the wider range of material.

== Conception ==
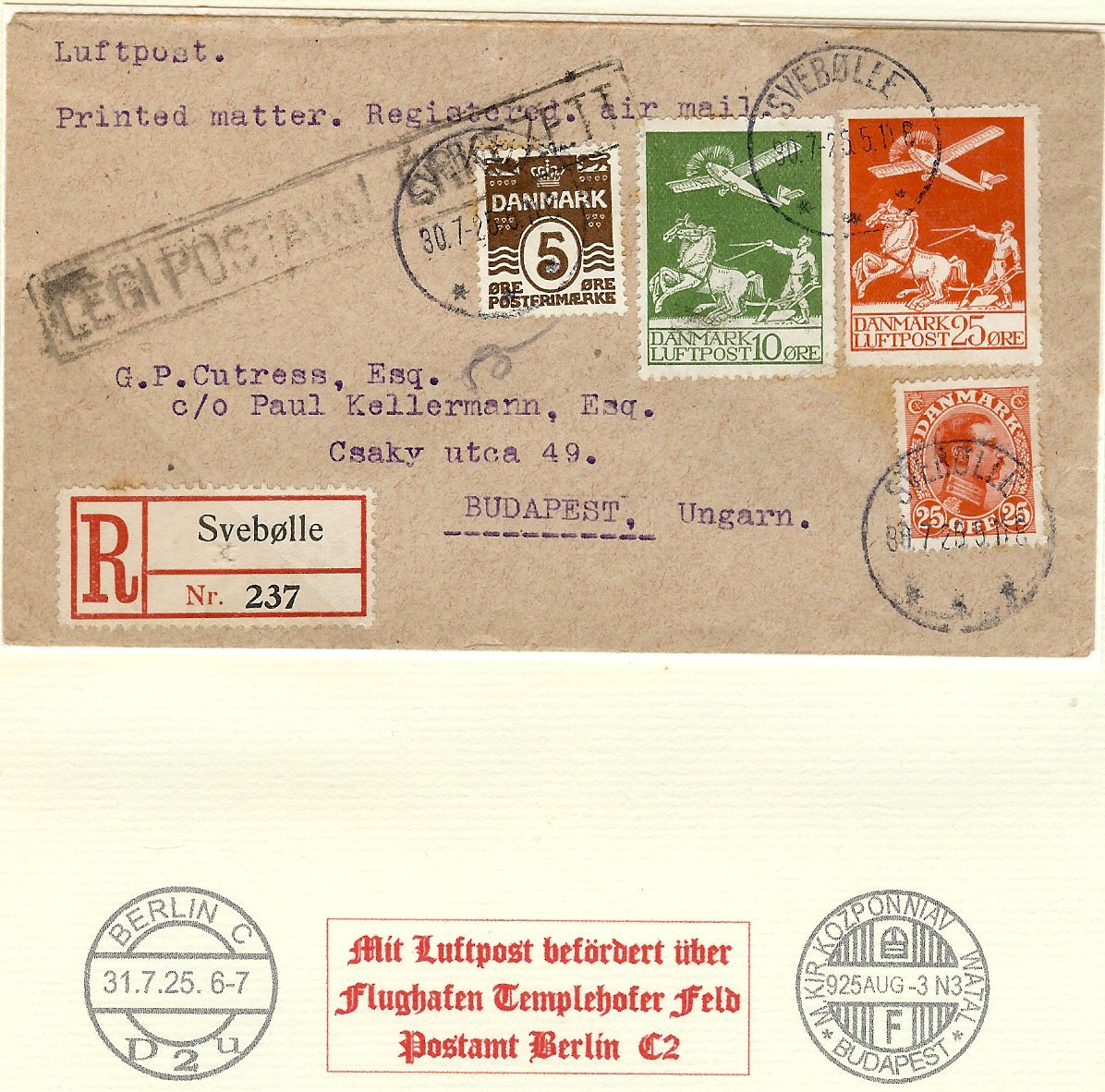
1925 Registered printed matter airmail letter from Denmark to Hungary.

Printed matter was produced by printers or publishers, such as books, magazines, booklets, brochures and other publicity materials and in some cases, newspapers. Because much of this material is mailed, it is also a category of mail, accepted for delivery by a postal administration, that is not considered to be first-class mail and therefore qualifies for a special reduced printed matter postal rate. Depending on the specific postal regulations of the country, it is usually non-personal correspondence and printed in multiple quantities. Most postal authorities do not permit additional services, like registration or express services, to be added to items mailed as printed matter.

In the Postal Convention between the United States of America and the Republic of Mexico, proclaimed on June 20, 1862, terms were specified relating to the rates for printed matter between the two countries. The rate was one cent for every ounce or fraction of an ounce.

== By country ==
=== China ===
Printed matter was called as Chūbǎn-wù (Chinese: 出版物) or Yìnshuā-pǐn (印刷品) what had the thousand-years history.

=== United States ===
As of June 2007, the USPS has a printed matter classification known as "Bound Printed Matter", BPM, defined as, advertising, promotional, directory, or editorial material that is securely bound and at least 90% is imprinted by a process other than handwriting or typewriting and is only available for user with an imprint permit.

For international shipment of printed matter, the USPS provides a discount M-bag service; following the 2007 elimination of surface mail, only airmail M-bag remains.

=== United Kingdom ===
The term is Printed Papers as used by the Royal Mail.

== See also ==
- Printing
- Paper
- Mail order catalog
