= Postage stamps and postal history of Reunion =

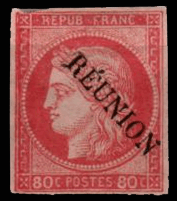
A French stamp overprinted for use in Reunion, 1891

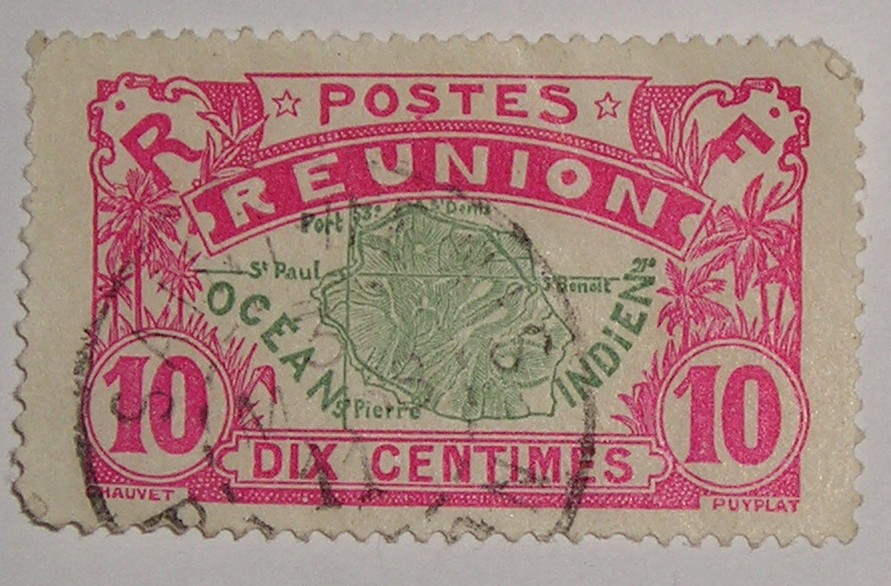
1907 stamp showing map of Reunion

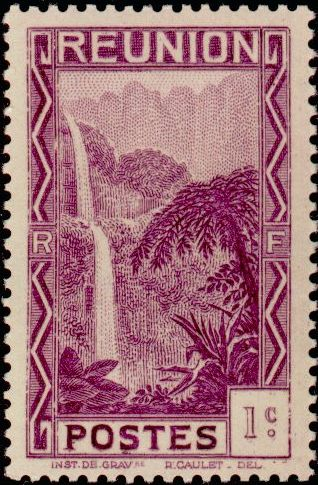
The 1933 definitive issue

This is a survey of the postage stamps and postal history of Réunion.

Réunion Island, formerly known as Île Bourbon, is a French island of about 800,000 population located in the Indian Ocean, east of Madagascar, about 200 kilometres (120 mi) south west of Mauritius, the nearest island. It is an overseas department of France and an integral part of the French Republic.

== First stamps ==
The first stamps of Reunion were issued on 1 January 1852. From 1885 French colonies stamps were overprinted for use in Reunion.

== Later issues ==
The first set of definitives was issued in 1892. Reunion used stamps of France surcharged in CFA franc from 1949 to 1974. Since 1975 stamps of France have been used without surcharge.

== See also ==
- Postage stamps of the French Colonies
