= Postage stamps and postal history of Guadeloupe =

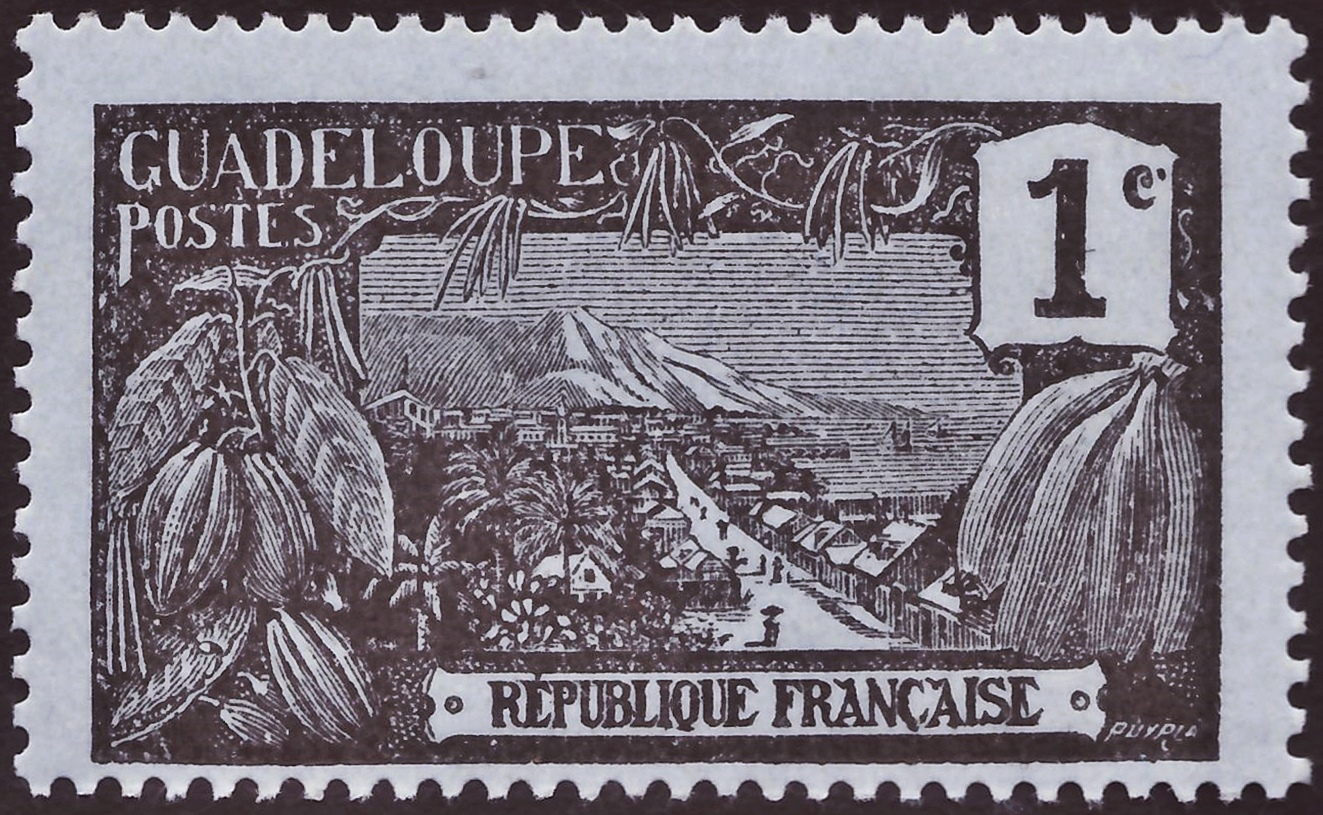
A 1905 stamp of Guadeloupe

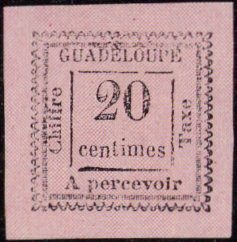
An 1884 postage due stamp of Guadeloupe

Guadeloupe issued stamps from 1884 using French colonies stamps overprinted with G.P.E or GUADELOUPE. The first definitives for Guadeloupe were issued in 1892. Guadeloupe has used stamps of France since 1947.
