= Postage stamps of the French colonies =

"French Colonies" is the name used by philatelists to refer to the postage stamps issued by France for use in the parts of the French colonial empire that did not have stamps of their own. These were in use from 1859 to 1906, and from 1943 to 1945.

== First stamps ==
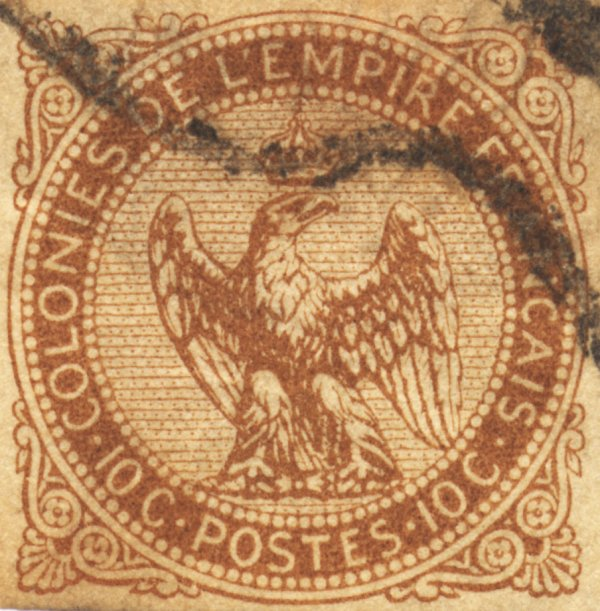
French Colonies stamp 1859

The first of these were small square stamps issued in 1859, depicting an eagle and crown in a round frame, with the inscription "COLONIES DE L'EMPIRE FRANCAIS". They were imperforate (as were all Colonies stamps until 1881). A total of six values, 1c to 80c, appeared between 1859 and 1865.

== Ceres ==
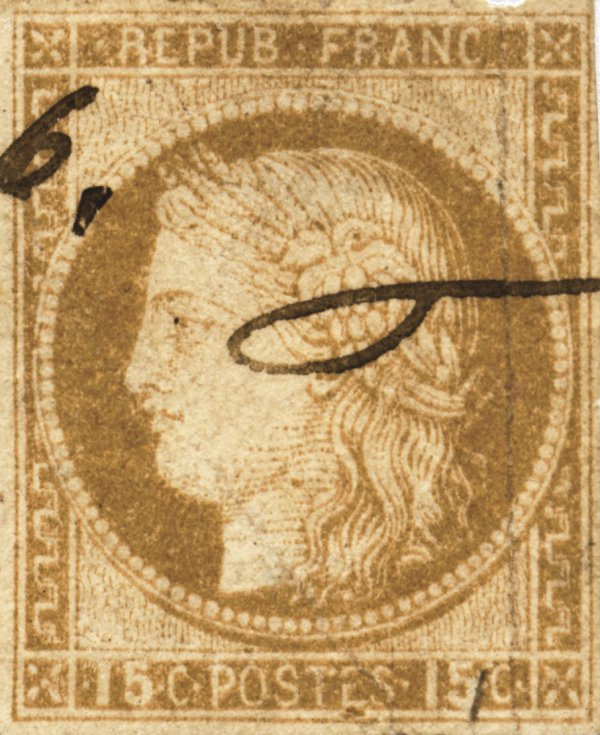
Ceres series 1871

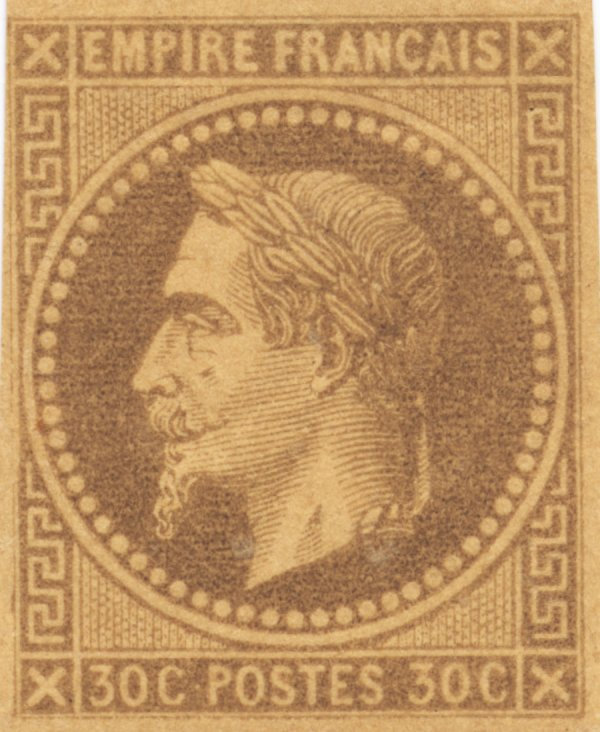
Napoleon III series 1871

The next series appeared in 1871 and 1872, and borrowed the contemporaneous designs of France, with profiles of Ceres and Emperor Napoleon III. While some of the nine values can be distinguished from the French stamps by color or value, others are extremely difficult to identify.

Several of an additional series of Ceres heads issued between 1872 and 1877 have a similar problem, and are distinguishable only by being imperforate, as was the Colonies part of the Peace and Commerce issue (Type Sage) of 1877 to 1880.

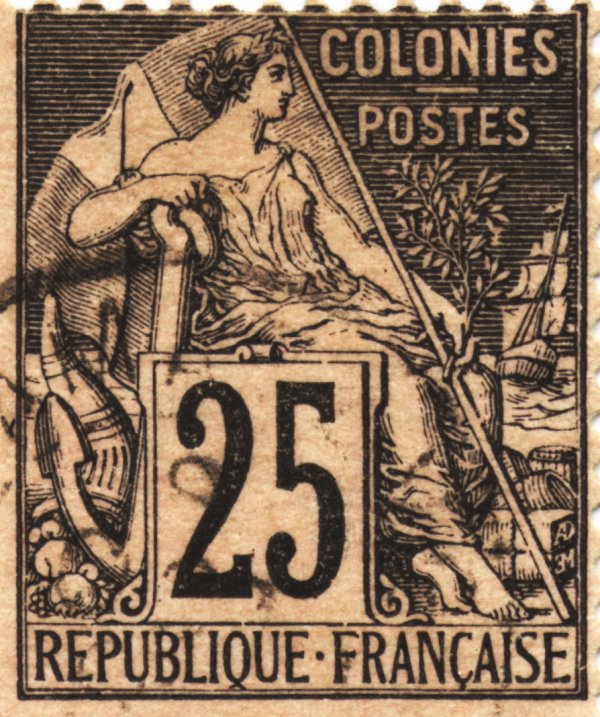
Commerce series 1886

== Commerce series ==
In 1881, a new series, featuring "Commerce" alone and inscribed "COLONIES", was issued, perforated 14x13.5. The 13 values, ranging from 1c to 1fr, were in colors comparable to those used for France. In 1886 the 25c stamp, previously printed in yellow, was reissued in black on a rose-colored paper. Stocks of the Commerce issue were frequently overprinted by the colonies during the 1880s and 1890s.

== Navigation & Commerce series ==
France began issuing stamps printed with the territory name in 1892 as part of the Navigation and Commerce issue.

A series of common postage due stamps was issued beginning in 1884, with a last one appearing in 1906. Thereafter each colony used only its own stamps.

== World War II ==
The concept was revived by the Free French forces during World War II, who printed eight types of semi-postal stamps in 1943 and 1944. After the Free French landed in Corsica and Southern France, the stamps were used in those areas, and became valid throughout France in November 1944.

Finally, in 1945 a general issue of postage due stamps for the colonies was produced.

== Postal stationery ==
Various items of postal stationery, in addition to postage stamps, were also produced for general issue to the French Colonies. A total of three postcards were issued in 1876, followed by two different cards in 1880 and two in 1885. One reply postcard was issued in 1885. Six different letter cards were issued in 1885 and two in 1890. Two postal stationery envelopes were produced and issued in 1889. Five different values of newspaper wrappers made available to the colonies in 1889.

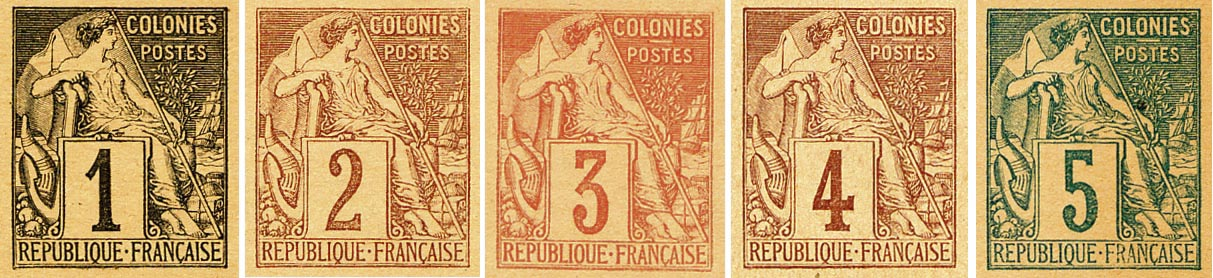
French Colonies imprints from newspaper wrappers (1889)

== See also ==
- Peace and Commerce issue
- Navigation and Commerce issue
