= Postage due =

Mail sent with insufficient postage

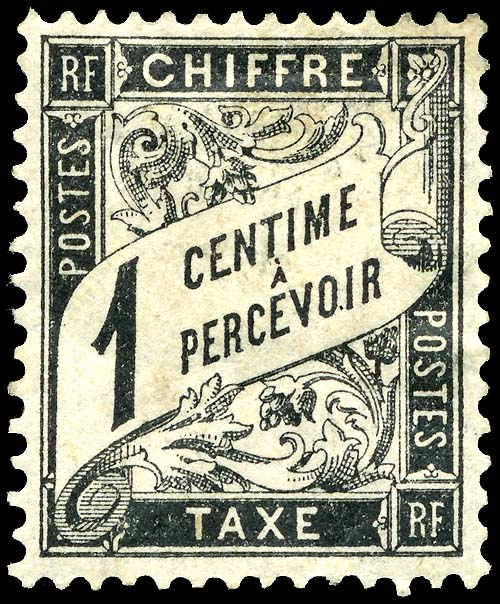
A French 1-centime postage due stamp from 1882

Postage due is the term used for mail sent with insufficient postage. A postage due stamp is a stamp added to an underpaid piece of mail to indicate the extra postage due.

== Background ==
While the problem of what to do about letters not paying the full correct fee had existed since the creation of regular postal systems, it was greatly heightened by the advent of postage stamps, since customers were now making their own decisions about the right amount to pay, without the assistance of a presumably knowledgeable postal clerk.

While at various times some countries have simply adopted the expedient of returning the letter to the sender, many others have taken the approach of delivering the letter and collecting the fee from the recipient. Initially the process was handled by a clerk writing something like "Due 3 cents" on the cover, but this was subject to abuse by mail carriers, who might write this message themselves and pocket the difference.

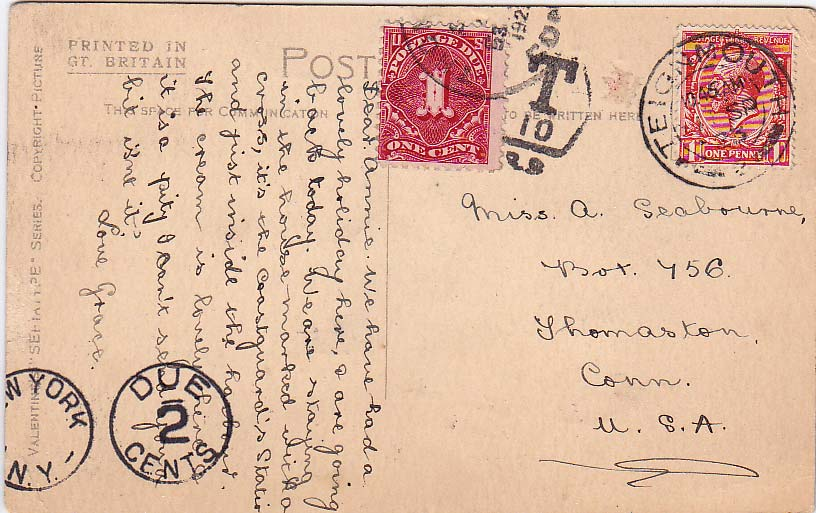
US postage due on UK cover

The problem of underpaid foreign mail was one of the issues addressed by the 1874 establishment of the Universal Postal Union. The U.P.U. arrived at the decision that mail with insufficient postage should be marked with a "T" and from April 1, 1879 the amount missing would also be indicated in black. Later more countries started to use handstamps to indicate the amount due. Later the combination of handstamps with both the "T" and the amount missing came into use. From October 1, 1907 the rules were changed. The amount to be charged instead of the amount missing would be indicated. The amount charged was usually double the amount that was missing.

== First stamps ==
The problem was solved by France in 1859, with the issuance of official postage due stamps, affixed at the delivery office before being taken out to the recipients. Many other countries followed suit. (Occasionally, regular postage stamps have been used to fulfill a postage due function.)

Postage due stamps (or "labels", to clarify that they have no value of their own) are not always affixed to individual letters; in the case of business mail, the total due might be summed, and the appropriate stamps added to the top letter in a bundle, or to a bundle's wrapper. The labels have also been used to collect money for other purposes, such as magazine subscriptions.

Since postage due stamps are almost always used only within a single country, they are usually quite simple in design, mostly consisting of a large numeral, and an inscription saying "postage due", "porto", etc.; often there is no country name. As with definitive stamps, a variety of values are needed to make up specific amounts.

== Decline in use ==
A number of countries have discontinued postage due stamps. Britain, which first issued theirs in 1914 (and continued the same design until 1970), ended their use in 2000. The United States terminated them in 1986, although postage meter labels were used after that date.

== In stamp collecting ==
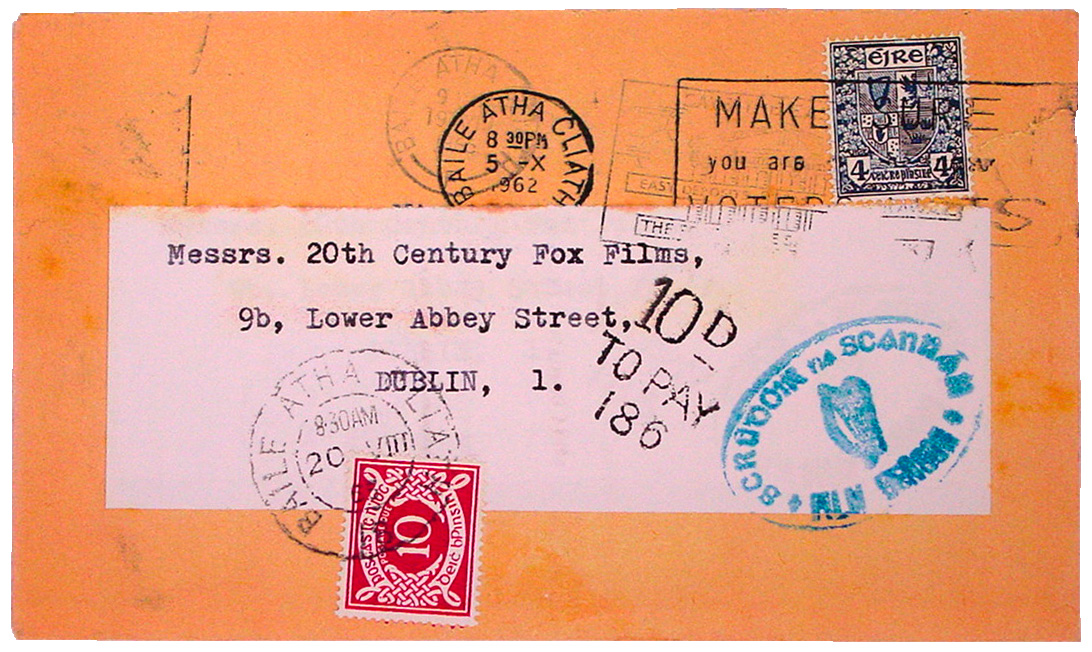
An Irish envelope with an instructional mark "10d To PAY" (186 code for Dublin) with a 10 pence postage due label affixed and tied by a datestamp

While, technically, there is no reason for postage dues to reach private hands unused, postal administrations have sold them to collectors, and postage dues of many countries exist in large numbers, often unused and of low value. Conversely, surviving examples of valid postally used postage due stamps tied together by a dated cancellation or other postal markings with a postage stamp on cover are less common and are sought after by philatelists.
