= List of entities that have issued postage stamps (M–Z) =

This is a list of entities that have issued postage stamps at some point since stamps were introduced in 1840. The list includes any kind of governmental entity or officially approved organisation that has issued distinctive types of stamp for postal purposes. These include post offices in foreign countries and postal services organised by military occupations, international organisations, colonies, provinces, city-states and some revolutionary movements. The list includes members of the Universal Postal Union that are also listed at postal organisations.

Many of these entities are historic and some were very short-lived indeed. Philatelists and stamp collectors often refer to the entities that no longer issue stamps as dead countries.

The dates are the generally agreed-upon dates of the first and last stamp issues. "Date of issue" is taken to mean the date when a particular type or variation was first issued but its usage would often continue for many years. For example, although an entity may have issued its last stamp in 1951, actual usage may have continued until 1960: in that case, 1951 is the last stamp issue date.

Besides the period of which stamps were issued in the name of a particular entity, the list under that entity also bears any other name in which stamps had been issued for the territory, the name of any other entity that had its stamps used in that territory, or new names which had subsequently replaced the name of that entity, together with their respective periods.

== List ==
The list has been comprehensively revised to include extra entities and to direct the links away from the country articles to the (proposed) philatelic articles.

=== Macao/Macau ===
- Macao, Republica Portuguesa 1884 – 1999
- Macau, China 1999 -

=== Madagascar and Dependencies ===
- Anjouan 1892 – 1914
- Diégo-Suarez 1890 – 1896
- Great Comoro 1897 – 1914
- Madagascar and Dependencies 1896 – 1958
- Mayotte 1892 – 1914
- Moheli 1906 – 1914
- Nossi-Bé 1889 – 1891
- Ste Marie de Madagascar 1894 – 1896

=== Madeira ===
- Funchal 1892 – 1905
- Madeira 1868 –

=== Malagasy Republic ===
- Malagasy Republic 1958 –

=== Malawi ===
- British Central Africa 1891 – 1908
- Nyasaland Protectorate 1907 – 1964
- Rhodesia and Nyasaland 1954 – 1964
- Malawi 1964 –

=== Malaysia ===
- Straits Settlements 1867 - 1937
- Federated Malay States 1900 – 1935
- Malaya (British Military Administration) 1945 – 1948
- Malayan Federation 1957 – 1963
- Malayan Postal Union 1936 – 1968
- Malaysia 1963 –
- Malaysian States and Territories
- Federal Territory
- Federal Territory (Kuala Lumpur) 1979 –
- Federal Territory (Putrajaya) 2001 –
- Labuan
- Straits Settlements
- Labuan 1879 - 1894
- North Borneo (Labuan overprint) 1894 - 1907
- Johore 1876 –
- Kedah 1912 –
- Kelantan 1911 –
- Malacca
- India 1854 - 1867
- Straits Settlements 1867 - 1937
- Malacca 1948 –
- Negri Sembilan
- Sungei Ujong 1878 – 1895
- Negri Sembilan 1891 –
- Pahang 1889 –
- Penang
- India 1854 - 1867
- Straits Settlements 1867 - 1937
- Penang 1948 –
- Perak 1878 –
- Perlis 1948 –
- Sabah
- North Borneo (British North Borneo) 1883 – 1894
- North Borneo (State of North Borneo) 1894 – 1939
- North Borneo (British Colony) 1945 – 1963
- Sabah 1964 –
- Sarawak 1869 –
- Selangor 1881 –
- Trengganu 1910 –

=== Maldive Islands ===
- Maldive Islands 1906 –

=== Mali Republic ===
- Mali 1960 –

=== Malta ===
- Malta 1860 –
- Sovereign Military Order of Malta 1966 –

=== Marshall Islands ===
- Marshall Islands (Marshall Inseln)(German Colony) 1897 – 1916
- Marshall Islands 1984 –
- US post in the Trust Territory of the Pacific Islands 1946 - 1984

=== Mauritania ===
- Mauritania 1960 –

=== Mauritius ===
- Mauritius 1847 –

=== Mexico ===
- Mexico 1856 –
- Campeche 1876 only
- Chiapas 1866 only
- Chihuahua 1872 only
- Cuautla 1867 only
- Cuernavaca 1867 only
- Guadalajara 1867 – 1868
- Mérida 1916 only
- Sinaloa 1929 only
- Tlacotalpan 1856 only
- Yucatán 1924 only

=== Micronesia, Federated States of ===
- Caroline Islands (Karolinen) (German colony) 1899 – 1914
- US post in the Trust Territory of the Pacific Islands 1946 – 1984
- Federated States of Micronesia 1984 –

=== Moldova ===
- Moldova 1991 –

=== Monaco ===
- Monaco 1885 –

=== Mongolia ===
- Mongolia 1924 –

=== Montenegro ===
- Montenegro 1874 – 1918; 2006 –

=== Morocco ===
- Morocco 1956 –
- Northern Zone, Morocco 1956 – 1958
- Sherifian Post 1912 – 1919
- Southern Zone, Morocco 1956 – 1958

=== Mozambique ===
- Mozambique 1876 –

=== Mozambique Territories ===
- Inhambane 1895 – 1920
- Kionga 1916 only
- Lourenco Marques 1895 – 1921
- Quelimane 1913 – 1920
- Tete 1913 – 1920
- Zambezia 1894 – 1917

=== Myanmar ===
- Burma

=== Nagorno–Karabakh ===
- Nagorno-Karabakh 1993 –

=== Namibia ===
- German South-West Africa 1888 – 1915
- South West Africa 1923 – 1991
- Namibia 1990 –

=== Natal ===
- Natal 1857 – 1909

=== Nauru ===
- Nauru 1916 –

=== Nepal ===
- Nepal 1881 –

=== Netherlands, Kingdom of the ===
- Netherlands (territory in Europe) 1852 –
- Aruba 1986 –
- Caribbean Netherlands 2010-
- Curaçao 1873 – 1948, 2010-
- Netherlands Antilles 1949 – 2010
- Netherlands Indies 1864 – 1948
- Netherlands New Guinea 1950 – 1962
- Sint Maarten 2010-
- Western New Guinea 1962 – 1963

=== New Zealand ===
- New Zealand 1855 –
- New Zealand Territories
- King Edward VII Land * 1908 only
- Victoria Land * 1911 – 1912
- Ross Dependency 1957 – 1987, 1994 –
- Niue 1902 –
- Tokelau 1948 –

* British claims with postal services formally assigned to the New Zealand Post Office

=== Nicaragua ===
- Nicaragua 1862 –
- Cabo Gracias a Dios, Nicaragua 1904 – 1909
- Zelaya, Nicaragua 1904 – 1912

=== Niger ===
- Niger 1959 –

=== Nigeria ===
- Nigeria 1914 –

=== Nigerian Territories ===
- Biafra 1968 – 1969
- Lagos 1874 – 1906
- Niger Coast Protectorate 1892 – 1902
- Northern Nigeria 1900 – 1914
- Oil Rivers Protectorate 1892 – 1893
- Southern Cameroons 1960 – 1961
- Southern Nigeria 1901 – 1914

=== Niuafo'ou ===
- Niuafo'ou 1983 –

=== Niue ===
- Niue 1902 –

=== Norfolk Island ===
- Norfolk Island 1947 –

=== North Macedonia ===
- North Macedonia 1991 –

=== Norway ===
- Norway 1855 –

=== Obock ===
- Obock (French Colony) 1893–1902

See Djibouti

=== Oman ===
- Muscat 1944 – 1948
- Muscat and Oman 1966 – 1970
- Oman 1971 –

=== Orange River Colony ===
- Orange Free State 1868 – 1900
- Orange River Colony 1900 – 1907

=== Pakistan ===
- Amb State
- Bahawalpur 1945 – 1949
- Las Bela State
- Pakistan 1947 –

=== Palau ===
- Caroline Islands (Karolinen) (German colony) 1899 – 1914
- Palau 1983 –
- US post in the Trust Territory of the Pacific Islands 1946 - 1983

=== Palestine ===
- Ottoman Post Offices
- Foreign Post Offices
- Palestine (British Mandate) 1917–1948
- Palestinian National Authority 1994–

=== Panama ===
- Panama 1878 –

=== Papua New Guinea ===
- British New Guinea 1901 – 1906
- New Britain 1914 – 1915
- New Guinea (Australian Administration) 1925 – 1942
- North West Pacific Islands 1915 – 1925
- Papua 1906 – 1942
- Papua New Guinea 1952 –

=== Paraguay ===
- Paraguay 1870 –

=== Penrhyn ===
- Penrhyn

=== Peru ===
- Peru 1858 –

=== Philippines ===
- Philippines 1946 –

=== Pitcairn Islands ===
- Pitcairn Islands 1940 –

=== Plebiscite Issues ===
- Allenstein 1920 only
- Carinthia 1920 only
- East Silesia 1920 only
- Marienwerder 1920 only
- Slesvig 1920 only
- Upper Silesia 1920 – 1922

=== Poland ===
- Poland 1918 –
- Poland (Russian Province) 1860 – 1863

=== Polish Post Abroad ===
- Central Lithuania (Polish Occupation) 1920 – 1922
- Constantinople (Polish Post Office) 1919 – 1921
- Danzig (Polish Post Office) 1924 – 1939
- Polish Army in Russia 1942 only
- Polish Corps in Russia 1918 only
- Polish Government in Exile 1941 – 1945

=== Portugal ===
- Portugal 1853 –

=== Portuguese Colonies ===
- Africa (Portuguese Colonies) 1898 only
- Mozambique Company 1892 – 1942
- Nyassa 1897 – 1929
- Portuguese Congo 1894 – 1920
- Portuguese Guinea 1881 – 1974
- Portuguese India 1871 – 1961
- Timor 1885 – 1976

=== Qatar ===
- Qatar 1957 –

=== Ras Al Khaimah ===
- Ras Al Khaima 1964 – 1966

See United Arab Emirates

=== Rhineland Palatinate ===
- Rhineland-Palatinate (German Allied Occupation French Zone) 1947–1949

See Germany

=== Rhodesia ===
- British South Africa Company 1890 – 1924
- Northern Rhodesia 1925 – 1964
- Nyasa-Rhodesia Force (NF) 1916 only
- Rhodesia 1965 – 1980
- Rhodesia (British Colonial Issues) 1909 – 1924
- Rhodesia and Nyasaland 1954 – 1964
- Southern Rhodesia 1924 – 1964
- Zambia 1964 –
- Zimbabwe 1980 –

=== Romania ===
- Turkish Post Offices
- Foreign Post Offices
- Moldavia 1858 – 1862
- Moldo-Wallachia 1862 – 1865
- Romania 1865 –
- Bessarabia 1941-1945
- Bucovyna 1941-1945
- Transnistria 1941-1945

=== Romanian Post Abroad ===
- Banat Bacska (Romanian Occupation) 1919 – 1920
- Constantinople (Romanian Post Office) 1896 – 1919
- Debrecen (Romanian Occupation) 1919 – 1920
- Hungary (Romanian Occupation) 1919 – 1920
- Romanian Post Offices in the Turkish Empire 1896 – 1919
- Temesvar (Romanian Occupation) 1919 only
- Transylvania (Romanian Occupation) 1919 only

=== Russia ===
- Russia 1992 –
- Russia (pre-Soviet) 1858 – 1923
- Turkish Post Offices (Batum)
- British Occupation (Batum)

=== Russian Civil War Issues ===
- Amur Province 1920 only
- Ataman Semyonov Regime 1920 only
- Crimea 1918 – 1919
- Denikin Government 1919 – 1920
- Don Territory 1918 – 1920
- Far Eastern Republic 1920 – 1922
- Kolchak Government 1919 – 1920
- Kuban Territory 1918 – 1920
- North Ingermanland 1920 only
- North Western Army 1919 – 1920
- Northern Army 1919 – 1920
- Priamur and Maritime Provinces 1921 – 1922
- Siberia (Czechoslovak Army) 1919 – 1920
- Transbaikal Province 1920 only
- Western Army 1919 – 1920
- Wrangel Government 1920 – 1921

=== Russian Post Abroad ===
- Russian post offices abroad
- Beirut (Russian Post Office) 1879 – 1910
- China (Russian Post Offices) 1899 – 1920
- Constantinople (Russian Post Office) 1909 – 1910
- Crete (Russian Post Offices) 1899 only
- Dardanelles (Russian Post Office) 1909 – 1910
- Jaffa (Russian Post Office) 1909 – 1910
- Jerusalem (Russian Post Office) 1909 – 1910
- Kerrasunde (Russian Post Office) 1909 – 1910
- Mount Athos (Russian Post Office) 1909 – 1914
- Mytilene (Russian Post Office) 1909 – 1914
- North Korea (Russian Occupation) 1946 – 1948
- Rizeh (Russian Post Office) 1909 – 1910
- Russian post offices in the Turkish Empire 1863 – 1914
- Salonika (Russian Post Office) 1909 – 1914
- Smyrne (Russian Post Office) 1909 – 1910
- South Lithuania (Russian Occupation) 1919 only
- Trebizonde (Russian Post Office) 1909 – 1910

=== Saar ===
- Saargebiet, Sarre (Plebiscite) 1920 – 1935
- Saar (Allied Occupation) 1947 – 1957
- Saar (German Federal Republic state) 1957 – 1959

See Germany

=== Saint Pierre and Miquelon ===
- Saint Pierre and Miquelon 1885 –

=== Samoa ===
- Samoa 1982 –
- Samoa (Kingdom) 1877 – 1900
- Samoa (New Zealand Administration) 1914 – 1935
- Samoa I Sisifo 1958 – 1982
- Western Samoa 1935 – 1958

=== San Marino ===
- San Marino 1877 –

=== Sao Tome e Principe ===
- Sao Tome e Principe 1870 –

=== Saudi Arabia ===
- Turkish Post Offices
- Foreign Post Offices
- Hejaz 1916 – 1926
- Hejaz-Nejd 1926 – 1932
- Nejd 1925 – 1926
- Saudi Arabia 1932 –

=== Sedang ===
- Sedang 1888 – 1890

=== Senegal ===
- Senegal 1960 –

=== Serbia ===
- Turkish Post Offices
- Foreign Post Offices
- Serbia (Kingdom of) 1866 – 1920
- Kingdom of Serbs, Croats and Slovenes 1921 -
- Yugoslavia 1944 – 2002
- Serbia and Montenegro 2003 – 2006
- Serbia (Republic of) 2006 –

=== Serbian Post Abroad ===
- Baranya (Serbian Occupation) 1919 only
- Hungary (Serbian Occupation) 1919 only
- Temesvar (Serbian Occupation) 1919 only

=== Seychelles ===
- British Indian Ocean Territory 1868 – 1976
- Seychelles 1890 –
- Zil Eloigne Sesel 1980 – 1982
- Zil Elwagne Sesel 1982 – 1984
- Zil Elwannyen Sesel 1985 – 1992

=== Sharjah ===
- Sharjah 1963 – 1972

See United Arab Emirates

=== Sierra Leone ===
- Sierra Leone 1859 –

=== Singapore ===
- Malaya (British Military Administration) 1945 – 1948
- Malaysia 1963 – 1965
- Singapore 1965 -
- Singapore, Malaya 1948 – 1959
- Singapore, State of 1959 - 1963
- Straits Settlements 1867 – 1942

=== Slovakia ===
- Slovakia 1993 –
- Slovakia (Autonomous State) 1939 – 1945

=== Slovenia ===
- Slovenia 1991 –
- Slovenia (Provincial Issues) 1919 – 1921

=== Solomon Islands ===
- British Solomon Islands 1907 – 1975
- Solomon Islands 1975 –

=== Somalia ===
- Somalia 1950 –
- British Somaliland
- British Somaliland 1903 only
- Somaliland Protectorate 1904 – 1960
- Italian Somaliland
- Benadir 1903 – 1905
- Oltre Juba 1925 – 1926

=== South Africa ===
- South Africa 1910 –
- South African Homelands
- Bophutatswana 1977 – 1994
- Ciskei 1981 – 1994
- Transkei 1977 – 1994
- Venda 1979 – 1994

=== South Arabia, Federation of ===
- Federation of South Arabia 1963 - 1968

See Yemen

=== South Georgia and South Sandwich Islands ===
- South Georgia 1963 – 1980
- South Georgia and the South Sandwich Islands 1980 –

=== South Sudan ===
- South Sudan 2011 -

=== Sovereign Military Order of Malta ===
- Postage stamps and postal history of Sovereign Military Order of Malta (Italy) 1966

=== Spain ===
- Canary Islands 1936 – 1938
- Spain 1850 –

=== Spanish Colonies ===
- Cape Juby 1916 – 1950
- Cuba and Puerto Rico 1855 – 1872
- Elobey, Annobón, and Corisco 1903 – 1908
- Fernando Poo 1868 – 1968
- Ifni 1941 – 1969
- La Agüera 1920 – 1924
- Puerto Rico 1873 – 1900
- Río de Oro 1905 – 1924
- Río Muni 1960 – 1968
- Spanish Guinea 1902 – 1960
- Spanish Marianas 1898 – 1899
- Spanish Morocco 1914 – 1956
- Spanish Philippines 1854 – 1898
- Spanish Sahara 1924 – 1975
- Spanish West Africa 1949 – 1951

=== Spanish Post Abroad ===
- Andorra (Spanish Offices) 1928 –
- Morocco (Spanish Post Offices) 1903 – 1914
- Tangier (Spanish Post Offices) 1921 – 1957
- Tetuan (Spanish Post Office) 1908 – 1909

=== Sri Lanka ===
- Ceylon 1857 – 1972
- Sri Lanka 1972 –

=== St Helena ===
- St Helena 1856 –

=== Sudan ===
- Sudan 1897 –

=== Suriname ===
- Suriname 1873 –

=== Swaziland ===
- Swaziland 1933 –
- Swaziland (Provisional Government) 1889 – 1894

=== Sweden ===
- Stockholm 1856 – 1862
- Sweden 1855 –

=== Swiss Cantonal Issues ===
- Basel 1845 only
- Geneva 1843 – 1850
- Zürich 1843 – 1850

=== Switzerland ===
- Switzerland 1849 –

=== Syria ===
- Alexandretta
- Turkish Post Offices
- Military occupation issues
- British occupation
- French occupation
- Foreign Post Offices
- Alaouites 1925 – 1930
- Hatay 1938 – 1939
- Ile Rouad 1916 – 1921
- Latakia 1931 – 1937
- Syria 1924 –

=== Taiwan ===
- Taiwan 2007 –

=== Tajikistan ===
- Tajikistan 1992 –

=== Tannu Tuva ===
- Tuvan People's Republic 1926 – 1936

=== Tanzania ===
- Tanzania 1965 –

=== Thailand ===
- Malaya (Thai Occupation) 1943 – 1945
- Siam 1883 – 1939
- Siam (Thailand) 1947 – 1950
- Thailand 1940 –

=== Thrace ===
- Adrianople (Edirne) 1920 – 1922
- Dedeagatz (Greek Occupation) 1913 only
- Eastern Thrace 1920 – 1922
- Gumultsina 1913 only
- Thrace (Allied Occupation) 1919 – 1920
- Western Thrace 1913 only
- Western Thrace (Greek Occupation) 1920 only

=== Thuringia ===
- Thuringia (German Allied Occupation Russian Zone) 1945–1946

See Germany

=== Tibet ===
- Tibet 1912 – 1959
- Tibet (Chinese Post Offices) 1911 – 1912

=== Timor Leste (East Timor) ===
- Portuguese Timor 1885 – 1976
- Indonesia 1976 - 1999
- Timor Lorosae (UNTAET) 2000 - 2002
- Timor Leste 2002 -

=== Togo ===
- Togo 1957 –
- Togo (Anglo – French Occupation) 1914 – 1919

=== Tokelau ===
- Tokelau 1948 –

=== Tonga ===
- Tonga 1886 –

=== Transvaal ===
- Lydenburg 1900 – 1902
- New Republic 1886 – 1888
- Pietersburg 1901 only
- Rustenburg 1900 – 1902
- Schweizer-Renecke 1900 only
- South African Republic 1869 – 1902
- Transvaal 1869 – 1910
- Volksrust 1902 only
- Wolmaransstad 1900 only

=== Trieste ===
- Trieste (AMG) 1947 – 1954
- Trieste (Yugoslav Military Government) 1948 – 1954

=== Tristan da Cunha ===
- Tristan da Cunha 1952 –

=== Trucial States ===
- Trucial States 1961 – 1972

See United Arab Emirates

=== Tunisia ===
- Tunisia 1888 –

=== Turkey ===
- Angora 1920 – 1923
- Turkey 1863 –
- Ottoman Empire issues 1863 – 1923
- Republic issues 1923 –
- Foreign Post Offices in the Turkish Empire
- Turkish Post Offices abroad

=== Turkmenistan ===
- Turkmenistan 1992 –

=== Turks and Caicos Islands ===
- Caicos Islands 1981 –
- Turks and Caicos Islands 1900 –
- Turks Islands 1867 – 1900

=== Uganda ===
- Uganda 1962 –

=== Ukraine ===
- Ukraine 1992 –
- Ukraine (pre-Soviet) 1918 – 1923
- Ukrainian Field Post 1920 only
- West Ukraine 1918 – 1919
- Carpathian Ukraine 1939 only
- Transcarpathian Ukraine 1945 only

=== Umm Al Qiwain ===
See United Arab Emirates

=== United Arab Emirates ===
- British postal agencies in Eastern Arabia 1948 - 1964
- Trucial States 1961 – 1972
- Trucial States (Individual Emirates)
- Abu Dhabi 1964 – 1972
- Ajman 1964 – 1967
- Dubai 1963 – 1972
- Fujeira 1964 – 1972
- Ras Al Khaima 1964 – 1966
- Sharjah 1963 – 1968
- Umm Al Qiwain 1964 – 1967
- United Arab Emirates (UAE) 1973 –

=== United Kingdom ===
- Alderney 1983 –
- Channel Islands 1948 only
- Great Britain 1840 –
- Great Britain (Regional Issues) 1958 –
- Guernsey 1941 –
- Isle of Man 1973 –
- Jersey 1941 –
- Northern Ireland 1958 –
- Scotland 1958 –
- Wales 1958 –
- Post Offices abroad

=== United Nations ===
- United Nations Postal Administration 1951 –

=== United States ===
- Confederate States of America 1861 – 1865
- Hawaii 1851 – 1898
- USA 1847 –
- Occupation issues

=== Uruguay ===
- Uruguay 1856 –

=== US Post Abroad ===
- Guam 1899 – 1901
- Philippines (US Administration) 1899 – 1945
- Shanghai (US Postal Agency) 1919 – 1922
- US Post Offices in Japan 1867 – 1874
- US post in the Trust Territory of the Pacific Islands 1946 - 1984

=== USSR ===
- Transcaucasian Federation 1923 – 1924
- Tuva 1926 – 1944
- USSR 1923 – 1992
- USSR Issues for the Far East 1923 only

=== Uzbekistan ===
- Uzbekistan 1992 –

=== Vanuatu ===
- New Hebrides 1908 – 1980
- Vanuatu 1980 –

=== Vatican City ===
- Vatican City 1929 –

=== Venezia Giulia and Istria ===
- Istria (Yugoslav Occupation) 1945 only
- Venezia Giulia and Istria (AMG) 1945 – 1947
- Venezia Giulia and Istria (Yugoslav Military Government) 1945 – 1947
- Venezia Giulia and Istria (Yugoslav Occupation) 1945 only

=== Venezuela ===
- Venezuela 1859 –

=== Windward Islands ===
- Barbados 1852 –
- Grenada 1861 –
- Grenadines of Grenada 1973 –
- Grenadines of St Vincent 1973 –
- St Lucia 1860 –
- St Vincent 1861 –
- Tobago 1879 – 1896
- Trinidad 1851 – 1913
- Trinidad and Tobago 1913 –

=== Württemberg ===
- Württemberg (German State) 1851–1924
- Württemberg (German Allied Occupation French Zone) 1947–1949

See Germany

=== Yemen ===
- Aden (Colony, State of) 1937 – 1963
- Aden
- Federation of South Arabia 1963 - 1968
- India 1854 - 1937
- Kathiri State of Seiyun 1942 – 1967
- Mahra Sultanate of Qishn and Socotra 1967 only
- North Yemen
- Qu'Aiti State in Hadhramaut 1955 – 1967
- Qu'Aiti State of Shihr and Mukalla 1942 – 1955
- Southern Yemen 1968 – 1971
- Upper Yafa 1967 only
- Yemen Arab Republic 1963 – 1990
- Yemen Arab Republic (Unified) 1990 –
- Yemen (Mutawakelite Kingdom) 1926 – 1970
- Yemen PDR 1971 – 1990

=== Yugoslavia ===
- Bosnian Serb Republic 1992 –
- Croatia (Yugoslav Regional Issue) 1945 only
- Montenegro (Yugoslav Regional Issues) 1945 only
- Serbia (Yugoslav Regional Issues) 1944 – 1946
- Serbia and Montenegro 2003 – 2006
- Slovenia (Yugoslav Regional Issues) 1945 – 1946
- Yugoslav Government in Exile 1943 – 1945
- Yugoslavia 1944 –
- Yugoslavia (Democratic Federation) 1944 – 1945
- Yugoslavia (Kingdom) 1929 – 1941

=== Zululand ===
- Zululand 1888 – 1897

== See also ==
- List of entities that have issued postage stamps (A–E)
- List of entities that have issued postage stamps (F–L)

== Bibliography ==
- Stanley Gibbons Ltd, Europe and Colonies 1970, Stanley Gibbons Ltd, 1969
- Stanley Gibbons Ltd, various catalogues
- Stuart Rossiter & John Flower, The Stamp Atlas, W H Smith, 1989
- XLCR Stamp Finder and Collector's Dictionary, Thomas Cliffe Ltd, c.1960
