= Zeppelin mail =

Method for transporting mail by zeppelin

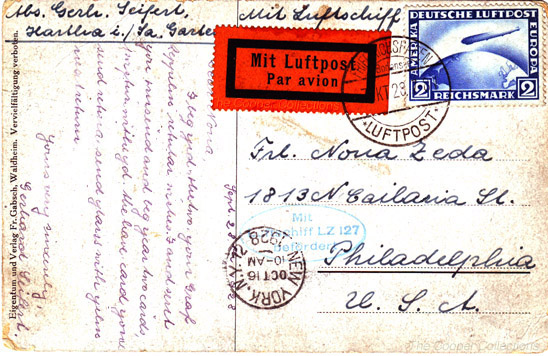
Postcard flown on the first North American flight of the Graf Zeppelin (1928)

Zeppelin mail was mail carried on zeppelins, the German airships that saw civilian use from 1908 to 1939. Almost every zeppelin flight carried mail, sometimes in large quantities; the covers usually received special postmarks, and a number of nations issued postage stamps specifically intended for use on mail carried by the zeppelins.

== First period, 1908 to 1914 ==
The first zeppelin to carry mail was LZ 4, in July 1908, followed shortly by LZ 3. The early flights did not use any special markings; the first was an oval reading "LUFTSCHIFF / SIGNALPOST" around the edge and "Z III" in the center, used on LZ 6 (Z 3) from August to October 1909. By 1911, a number of different postmarks were in use; a typical example was a circle reading "AN BORD DES / ZEPPELIN / LUFTSCHIFFES", with a date in the center and the name of the zeppelin at bottom. These were actually applied on board the zeppelin while in flight, at a small postal station.

The zeppelins were taken into military service in 1914, and thereafter did not carry civilian mail, although military commanders had special handstamps applied to their mail.

== Inter-war period, 1919 to 1939 ==
In late 1919, LZ 120 Bodensee resumed flights and mail carriage, using postmarks much as before the war, until 1921 when it was given to Italy as a war reparation. LZ 126 carried mail briefly in 1924 before it was delivered to the United States and renamed the Los Angeles (ZR-3). The Los Angeles carried mail between Lakehurst, New Jersey, Bermuda, and Mayagüez, Puerto Rico, several times.

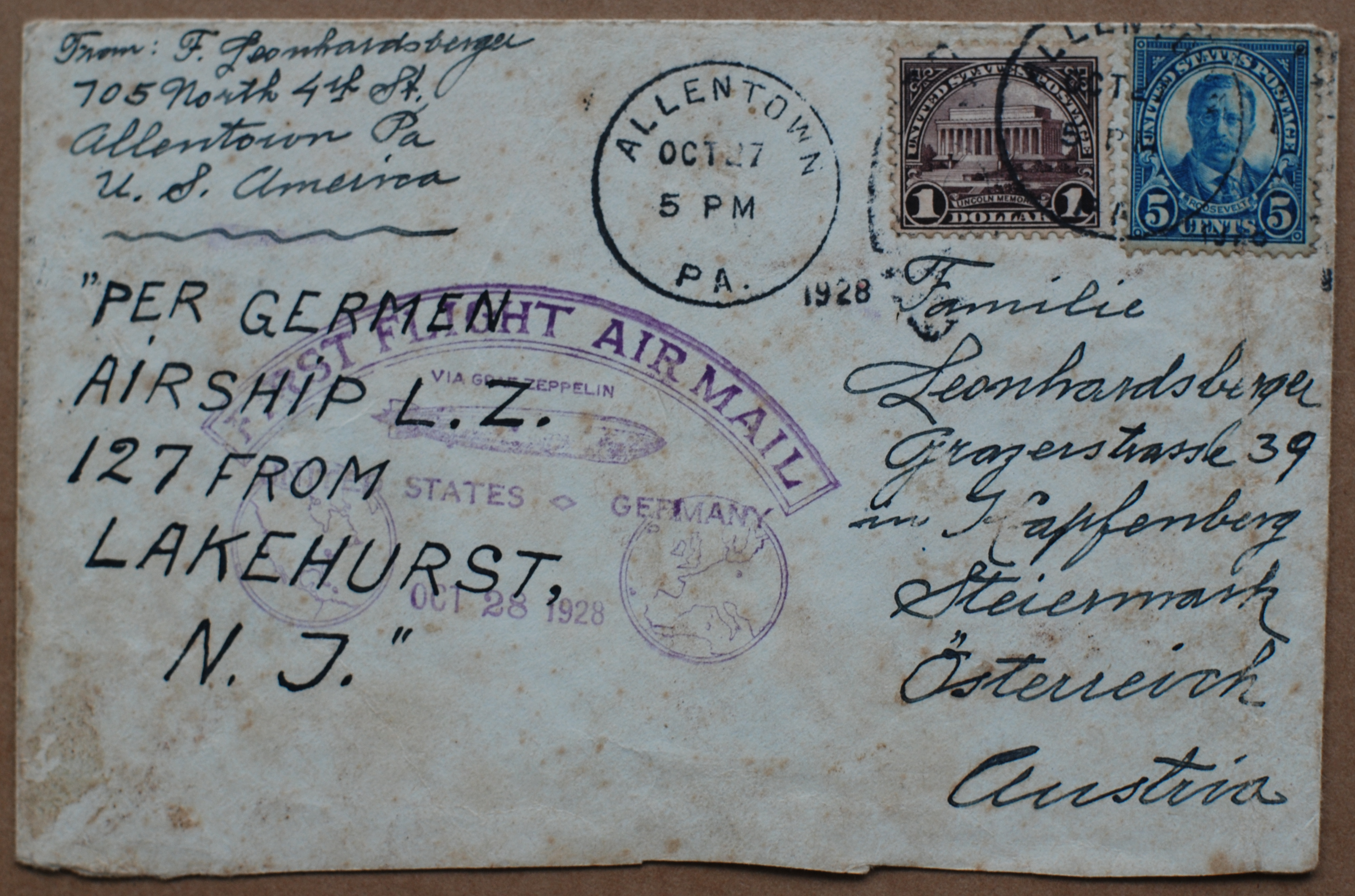
Letter on the first Germany flight of the Graf Zeppelin (1928)

LZ 127 Graf Zeppelin had a long and celebrated career. Within weeks of its first flight in September 1928, the Graf Zeppelin carried the first airmail to go directly from Germany to the US and vice versa. Germany issued special 2-mark and 4-mark stamps for the occasion. On the return trip, the zeppelin carried almost 52,000 postcards and 50,000 letters. In 1929, Graf Zeppelin circled the globe, with stops in Tokyo and Los Angeles. By the time it was taken out of service in June 1937, the zeppelin had made 590 flights, each flight carrying up to 12 tons of mail to and from dozens of countries around the world.

Although LZ 129 Hindenburg is most famous for its fiery end, for the 14 months of its existence, it carried considerable amounts of mail overseas, and many of those are readily available today. Most of the 17,609 pieces of mail on the last flight were destroyed in the fire, but a handful were recovered, and today they are highly prized crash covers.

The LZ 130 Graf Zeppelin II was the last of the zeppelins to carry mail; it was in civilian service for only a few months, from October 1938 to August 1939, and made only 30 trips, all within Germany.

== Zeppelin stamps ==
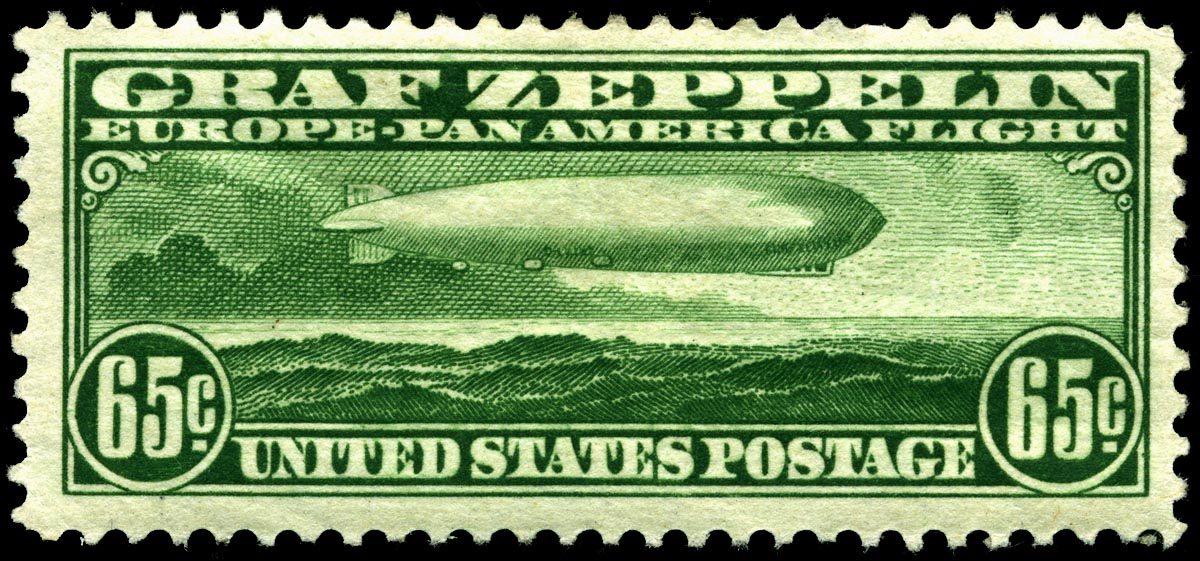
US 65-cent "Zeppelin" stamp, one of three values issued specially for the May–June 1930 Pan-American flight of the Graf Zeppelin

Zeppelin stamps were issued by a few countries to pay the postage for mail carried on Zeppelin flights during the late 1920s and early 1930s when Zeppelins flew passengers and mail from Germany to other countries and on return flights. Some stamps were regular issues overprinted while other were specially designed.

Zeppelin stamp issuing countries
Postal administration	Year	Denominations	Notes
Argentina	1931	5¢, 18¢, 90¢	black overprint on 5¢, 18¢ red overprint on 90¢
Bolivia	1930	5c on 10c, 10c, 15c, 25c, 50c, 1b	overprint "CORREO AEREO / R. S. 6–V–1930"; 5c on 10c has additional "5 CTS." overprint 10c known in black and bronze overprint 50c known in red and bronze overprint
Brazil	1931	2500r on 200r, 500r on 300r 2500r on 3000r	overprint "ZEPPELIN / 2$500" overprint "2.500 REIS"
Brazil	1932	3500r on 5000r 7000r on 10,000r	overprint "ZEPPELIN / 3$500"
Cyrenaica	1933	3l, 5l, 10l, 12l, 15l, 20l	Zeppelin and clouds forming Pegasus; Zeppelin and ancient galley Zeppelin and giant bowman
Egypt	1931	50m on 27m, 100m on 27m	bilingual overprint "GRAF ZEPPELIN / AVRIL 1931" overprint error "1951 instead of "1931"
Finland	1930	10m	overprint "ZEPPELIN / 1930" forgeries are known error "1830" for "1930"
Germany	1928 -31	1m, 2m, 4m	stamps show Graf Zeppelin crossing ocean
Germany	1930	2m, 4m (Note: Counterfeits are known of these stamps)	overprint "(logo) / SÜDAMERIKA / FAHRT"
Germany	1931	1m, 2m, 4m	brown overprint "POLAR– / FAHRT / 1931"
Germany	1933	1m, 2m, 4m	overprint "Chicagofahrt / Weltaustellung / 1933" for Chicago World's Fair flight
Greece	1933	30d, 100d, 120d	Zeppelin over Acropolis
Hungary	1931	1p	overprint "Zeppelin / 1931" on Turul carrying messenger stamp
Iceland	1931	30a	regular issue overprinted "Zeppelin / 1931"
Italy	1933	3l, 5l, 10l, 12l, 15l, 20l	Zeppelin over pyramid of Caius Cestius
Liechtenstein	1931	1fr, 2fr	1fr - Zeppelin over Naafkopf Falkniz Range; 2fr Zeppelin over Valüna Valley
Liechtenstein	1936	1fr, 2fr	Airship Graf Zeppelin
Paraguay	1935	3p on 4p, 4p	overprint "Cerreo Aéreo / (Zeppelin image) / ""Graf Zeppelin"" the Zeppelin image was handstamps while the text was printed
Russia	1930	40k 80k	Zeppelin and "Call to Complete 5-year Plan in 4 Years" for Graf Zeppelin flight from Friederichshafen to Moscow and return
Russia	1931 32	10k, 15k, 20k, 50k, 1r	5 different designs imperforate and with varying perforations and watermarks - bogus perforations errors are known
Russia	1931	30k, 35k, 1r, 2r	North Pole issue with Graf Zeppelin and Icebreaker Malygin transferring mail all imperforate and perforated
San Marino	1933	3l on 50c, 5l on 80c, 10l on 1l 12l on 2l, 15l on 2.60l, 20l on 3l	overprint "(Zeppelin image) / ZEPPELIN / 1933 / L. (value)." also known inperforate
Tripolitania	1933	3l, 5l, 10l, 12l, 15l, 20l	Mercury and Zeppelin
United States	1930	65¢, $1.30, $2.60	three different designs illustrating a Zeppelin
United States	1933	50¢	for the Chicago Century of Progress World's Fair flight

== See also ==
- 1930 Graf Zeppelin stamps of the United States
- LZ 127 Graf Zeppelin
- Airship
- Zeppelin

== Notes, references and sources ==
Notes

Sources

- Zeppelinpost Spezial-Katalog (Sieger) (in German)
