= Saudi Post =

National post service for Saudi Arabia

Saudi post
- Type: Agency of the Government of Saudi Arabia
- Industry: Postal and logistics services
- Founded: 1926
- Headquarters: Riyadh, Saudi Arabia
- Key people: H.E Anef Bin Ahmed Abanomi, President of Saudi Post Corporation
- Website: splonline.com.sa

Saudi Post (Arabic: البريد السعودي "سُبل", romanized: al-Barīd al-Suʿūdī "Subul") is a government operated postal system in Saudi Arabia; it is generally referred to within the kingdom as "al-Bareed". It was previously part of the Ministry of Post, Telegraph and Telephone.

An efficient postal network now covers all the cities and villages of the Kingdom, with 478 main and 180 branch post offices.

In 2006, 858.1 million pieces of post were handled by a network of governmental and private post offices.

Saudi Post has evolved through two main phases. The first phase being the establishment of Saudi Arabia and the second the establishment of post by the late King Abdul Aziz bin Abdul Rahman Al-Saud.

== Services ==
- Wasel (Arabic: خدمة واصل): a service to deliver all postal services to homes of citizens and residents by providing a unique postal address through geographic information systems (GIS).
- Jamaee (Arabic: خدمة جامعي): designed specifically for sending the student admission documents to all public universities for free.
- Mureeh (Arabic: خدمة مريح): service is dedicated for serving the reviewers of ministries and government agencies, to allow citizens to follow all governmental transactions through the offices of Saudi Postal Corporation deployed in all cities and provinces of the kingdom, and sending it to the concerned destination.
- Par Ex (Arabic: خدمة التوصيل للمملكة المتحدة): a specialized service from EMS for shipments going to Britain
- Gulf Ex (Arabic: خدمة الخليج اكسبريس): a low price service for parcels and presents to other Arab states of the Persian Gulf. Next morning delivery is available to the capitals of these states.
- Indian Par Ex (Arabic: خدمة التوصيل للهند): service for sending parcels and presents, up to 30 kg, to India.
- Nile Ex (Arabic: خدمة التوصيل لمصر والسودان)
- Same Day

== See also ==
- Postage stamps and postal history of Saudi Arabia
