= Poste San Marino =

San Marino's postal service

Poste San Marino S.p.A.

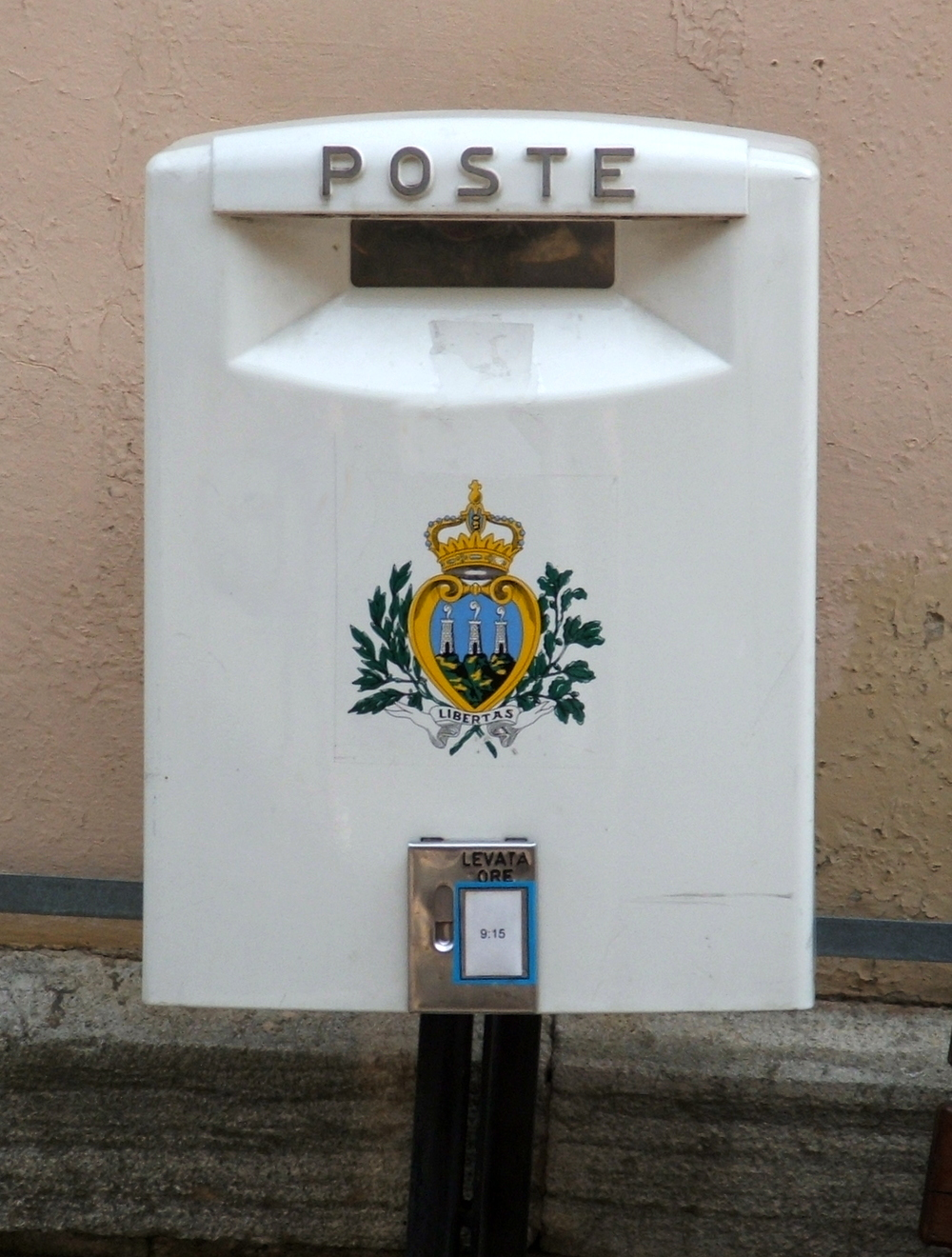
- A Poste Sammarinesi postbox
- Type: Subsidiary
- Industry: Postal services; Financial services
- Founded: 1607; 419 years ago
- Founder: San Marino
- Headquarters: 32 Strada Borrana, Serravalle, San Marino
- Area served: San Marino
- Services: Postal services; Financial services; Payments
- Owner: Secretary for Labour and Cooperation (100%)
- Parent: Poste Italiane
- Website: www.poste.sm

Poste San Marino (Italian pronunciation: [ˈpɔste sam maˈriːno], lit. 'San Marino Post') or Poste Sammarinesi (pronounced [ˈpɔste sammariˈneːzi], lit. 'Sammarinese Post') is the company responsible for postal service in San Marino.

== History ==
It was established on 7 October 1607, with the first stamps printed in 1877.

San Marino joined the Universal Postal Union on 7 January 1915.

It became a Società per azioni (S.p.A.) in 2016.

== Post office locations ==
- Acquaviva - Via Fabrizio da Montebello, 5
- Borgo Maggiore - Piazza Grande, 25
- Chiesanuova - Via Corrado Forti, 64
- City of San Marino - Via Gino Giacomini, 69
- Dogana - Piazza Marino Tini, 3
- Domagnano - Piazza Filippo da Sterpeto, 3
- Fiorentino - Via la Rena, 19
- Faetano - Strada della Croce, 48
- Montegiardino - Via del Dragone, 17
- Serravalle - Via Coluccio Salutati, 3
- Serravalle - Strada Borrana, 32

== See also ==
- Postage stamps and postal history of San Marino
- Poste Italiane
