= Postage stamps and postal history of Tajikistan =

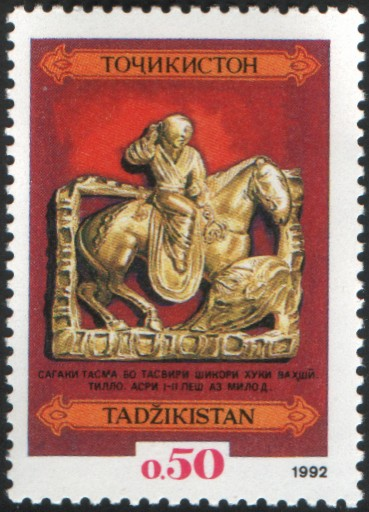
First stamp, 1992

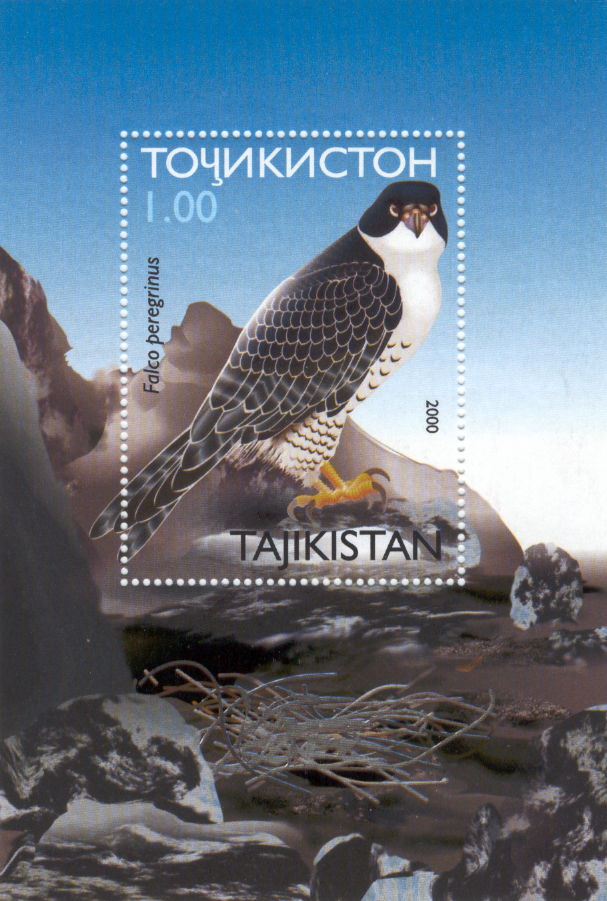
A Tajikistan miniature sheet from 2001

This is a survey of the postage stamps and postal history of Tajikistan.

Tajikistan, officially the Republic of Tajikistan, is a mountainous landlocked country in Central Asia. Once part of the Samanid Empire, Tajikistan became a constituent republic of the Soviet Union in the 20th century, known as the Tajik Soviet Socialist Republic (Tajik SSR). It became independent in 1991.

== First stamps ==
The first stamps of Tajikistan were issued on 20 May 1992. Before then, Tajikistan used stamps of the Soviet Union.

== Overprints ==
In 1992 and 1993 the Tajikistan Post Office resorted to overprinting stamps of the Soviet Union as supplies of the new Tajik stamps ran low.

== Bogus stamps ==
Tajikistan is a member of the Universal Postal Union and has issued notices through the U.P.U. warning of bogus stamps on popular thematic subjects issued in their name.
