= Postage stamps and postal history of the Saar =

This is a survey of the postage stamps and postal history of the German territory of the Saar. As a border region contested between France and Germany, the Saar has a somewhat complicated philatelic history. (Note that although the state is now known as Saarland, English-speaking philatelists universally use "Saar".)

== League of Nations administration ==
Originally a German territory of great interest to France, after World War I the Territory of the Saar Basin was to be administered by the League of Nations for a period of 15 years. In the absence of an existing nation to take over mail delivery, the League established its own postal administration.

The first stamps of the Saar were contemporary German stamps overprinted "Sarre" (the French name) and with a heavy solid bar striking out the "DEUTSCHES REICH" at the bottom of the stamp. This overprint was applied to 17 denominations, ranging from 2 pfennig to 1 mark, and first went on sale 30 January 1920. The stamps of Bavaria were overprinted similarly, and first available on 1 March. On 26 March, more German overprints were issued, this time reading "SAARGEBIET" (the German language name for Saar Territory) and not striking out the name of the old Reich.

Surcharges of 20pf, 5m, and 10m on German stamps came out in early 1921, followed by the Saar's first definitive series. This was a set of 16 local scenes, ranging from a view of the Saar River near Mettlach to the Burbach Steelworks at Dillingen. The stamps were somewhat rudely typographed and most were printed in two colors; although bordering on the garish, they are striking nevertheless.

On 1 May 1921, the series was surcharged in centimes and francs, and in 1922 it was replaced by a new series of same designs, but redrawn, denominated in the new money, and printed in different colors.

The Madonna of Blieskastel was commemorated by a pair of stamps (45c and 10fr) in 1925, then in 1927 a new definitive series came out, still borrowing designs from the first series, but now in different shapes, and printed in a single color using photogravure. On 1 November 1934, in preparation for the plebiscite the following year, this series was overprinted "VOLKSABSTIMMUNG / 1935"; the plebiscite in January 1935 having gone in favor of rejoining Germany, Saar came under the German postal system.

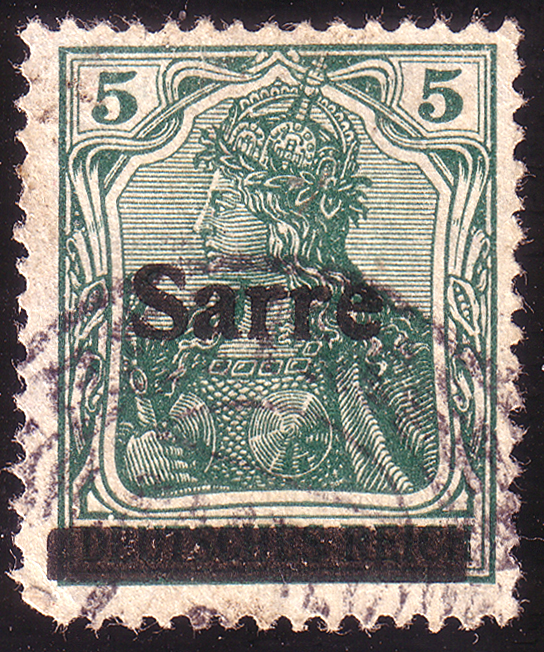
German stamp overprinted "Sarre", 1920

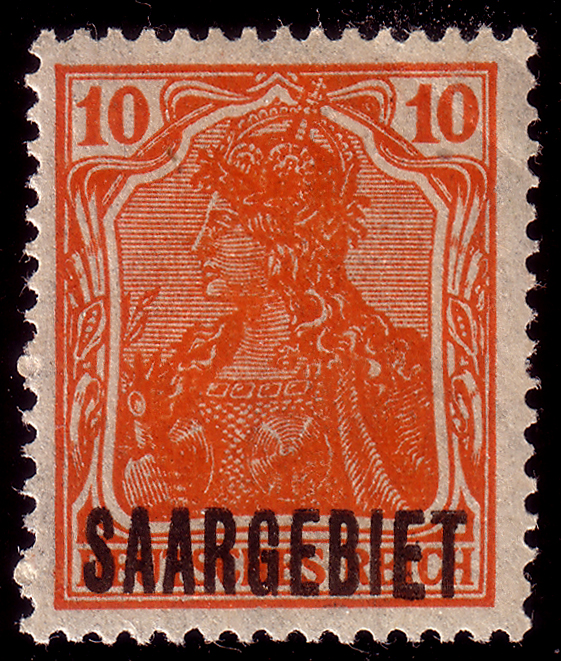
German stamp overprinted "Saargebiet", 1920

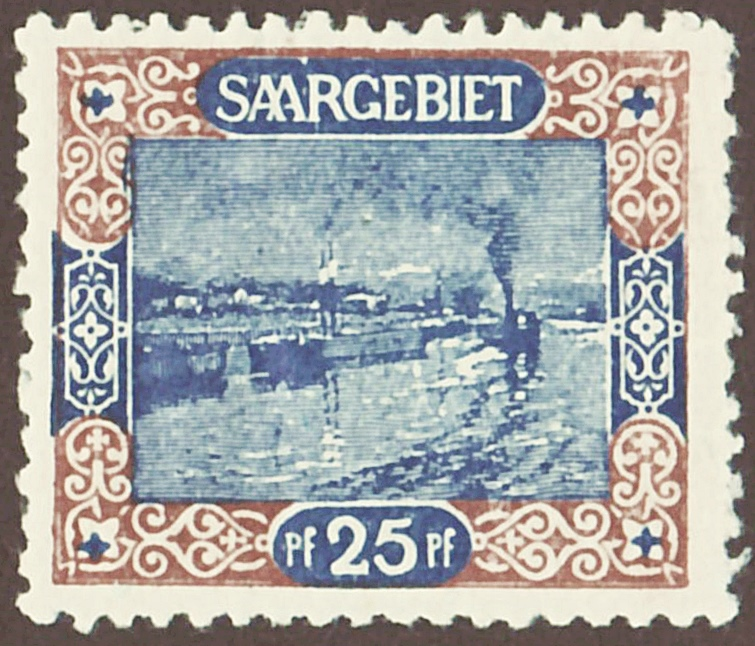
First definitive series, 1921

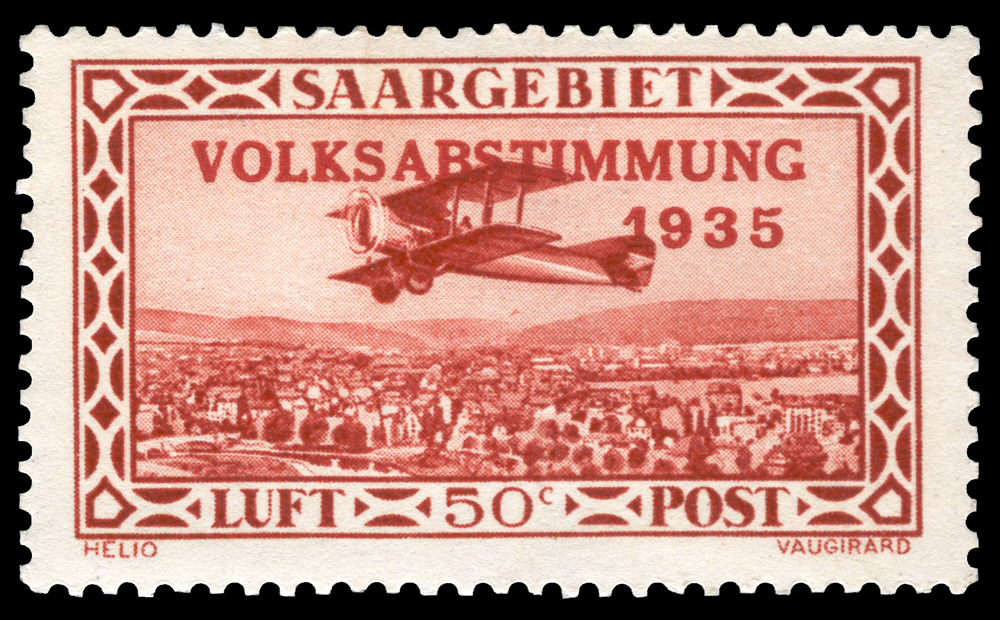
Stamp overprinted "VOLKSABSTIMMUNG 1935" in 1934

== French protectorate ==
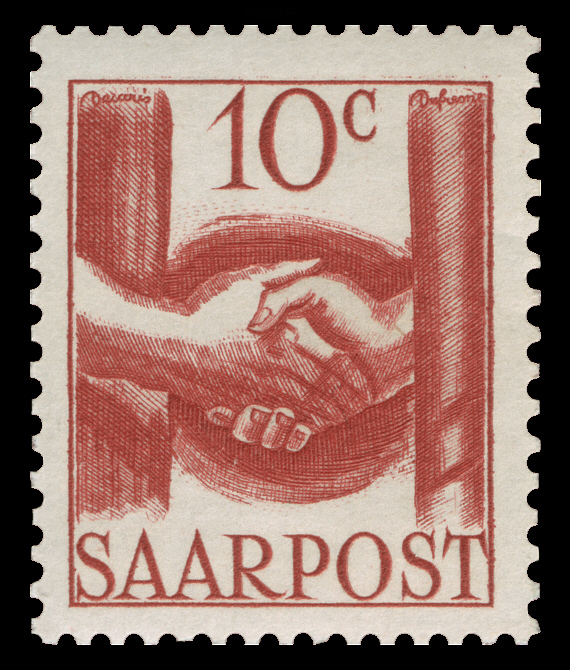
Stamp of the Saar Protectorate, 1948

After World War II, Saar was one of the occupied areas to come under the administration of France. On 28 July 1945 the postal service in the Saar Area was separated from that in the French zone of occupation in Allied-occupied Germany, forming the Oberpostdirektion Saar (High Postal Directorate of the Saar) in Saarbrücken. Postal services were provided again starting in August 1945 for official purposes, and private mail, at the beginning to a restricted extent only, was resumed in September.

On 17 November 1947 the Oberpostdirektion Saar was transformed into the Post-, Telegraphen- und Telephonverwaltung des Saarlandes (abbreviated like the French correspondent entity as P.T.T. Saarland; Post, Telegraph and Telephone Administration of the Saarland), keeping the headquarters in Saarbrücken. Postal vehicles and postboxes were green (RAL 6001), like in France. The French established the Saar Protectorate in December 1947.

The first stamps valid only in the Saar Area were issued in 1947. A first set of definitives came out in mid-1947, and included 17 stamps using six designs, including workers of various occupations, Mettlach Abbey, and Marshal Ney. Three of these values were also printed on paper watermarked with a pattern of curving lines. These first stamps were denominated in German currency, but just as before, were replaced in November by French currency denominations. The postal tariffs were adapted to the French system with mail to France at the domestic rate and mail to Allied-occupied Germany at the foreign tariff. The postal service of the Bizone subsumed mail to the Saar Protectorate under the foreign postage only as of 1 October 1948.

On 1 April 1948 the P.T.T. Saarland issued a new series inscribed "SAARPOST", followed by another in 1949 inscribed "SAAR". The P.T.T. Saarland issued a few commemoratives each year through 1956, punctuated by a definitive set showing various buildings, in 1952.

After the 1955 Saar Statute referendum failed, France accepted the prevailing preference of the Saar population to return to Germany. So following that, mail to West Germany, East Germany or either part of Berlin was charged again with the domestic postage.

== German administration ==
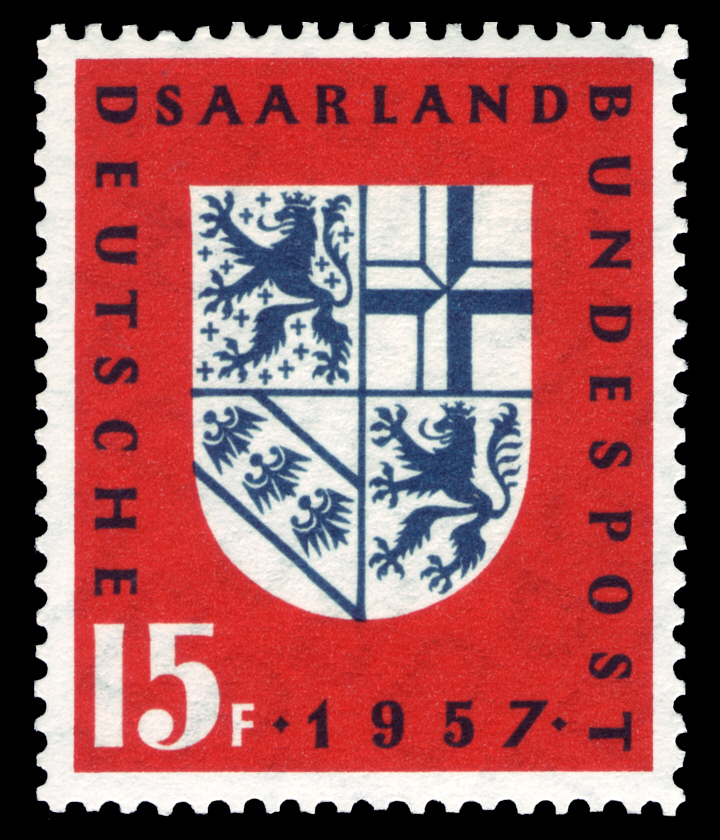
Stamp of Saarland, 1957

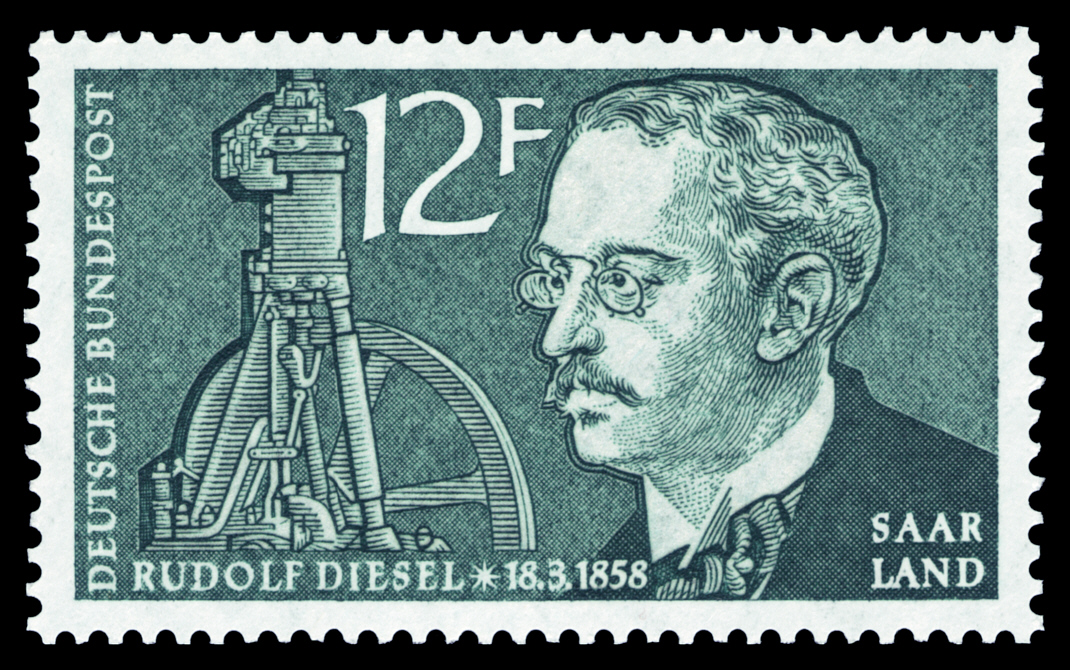
Rudolf Diesel on a 1958 postage stamp

On 1 January 1957 the P.T.T. Saarland was transformed into the Oberpostdirektion Saarbrücken of the Deutsche Bundespost. The return of the Saar Area to German control was commemorated on 1 January 1957 by a special stamps, then followed shortly thereafter by definitives with the then-standard profile of President Theodor Heuss, and inscribed both "SAARLAND" and "DEUTSCHE BUNDESPOST". The numerals did not indicate a monetary system, but were implicitly francs; later in 1957, the stamps were reissued with a small "F" after the numeral.

Starting on 8 July 1957 mail from the Saarland to France, the French dominions, Italy and Luxembourg was not subsumed under the domestic tariff any more, but under a preferential postage granted until 30 June 1959, when the general foreign postage started to apply.

Additional commemoratives appeared regularly for several more years while the German monetary system was re-established on 6 July 1959. The last postage stamp of the Saar was a single 15-franc issue honoring Alexander von Humboldt, which went on sale 6 May 1959. Thereafter Saarland used the regular stamps of the Federal Republic of Germany.

== Sources ==
- Stanley Gibbons Ltd: various catalogues
- AskPhil – Glossary of Stamp Collecting Terms
- Rossiter, Stuart & John Flower. The Stamp Atlas. London: Macdonald, 1986. ISBN 0-356-10862-7
