= Postage stamps and postal history of Tunisia =

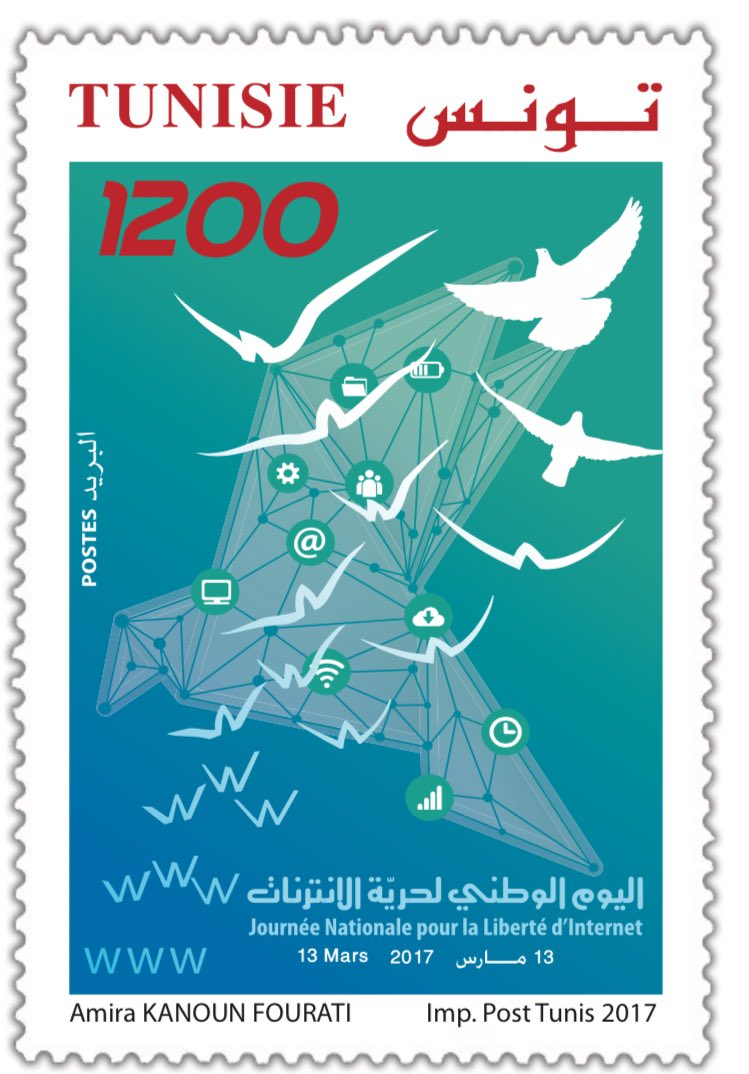
A 2017 Tunisian stamp

This is a survey of the postage stamps and postal history of Tunisia.

Tunisia is the northernmost country in Africa. It is bordered by Algeria to the west, Libya to the southeast, and the Mediterranean Sea to the north and east. Its area is almost 165,000 km², with an estimated population of just over 10.3 million. Its name is derived from the capital Tunis located in the north-east.

== First stamps ==
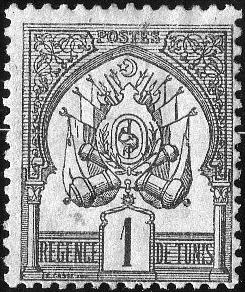
An 1888 stamp of Tunisia

The first stamps were issued for the French protectorate of Tunisia on 1 July 1888, marked "Régence de Tunis" (Regency of Tunis).

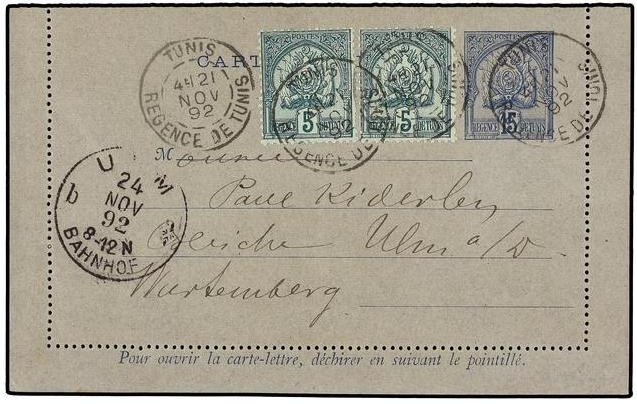
An 1892 lettercard with Tunisian stamps and postmarked Tunis

== Independence ==
Tunisia achieved independence from France on March 20, 1956 as the Kingdom of Tunisia. A year later, Tunisia was declared a republic.
