= Postage stamps and postal history of Mauritania =

A 1966 stamp of Mauritania

This is a survey of the postage stamps and postal history of Mauritania.

Mauritania is a country in North Africa bordered by the Atlantic Ocean in the west, by Western Sahara in the north, by Algeria in the northeast, by Mali in the east and southeast, and by Senegal in the southwest. The capital and largest city is Nouakchott, located on the Atlantic coast. It was a constituent part of French West Africa from the end-19th century until it achieved independence in 1960.

== First stamps ==
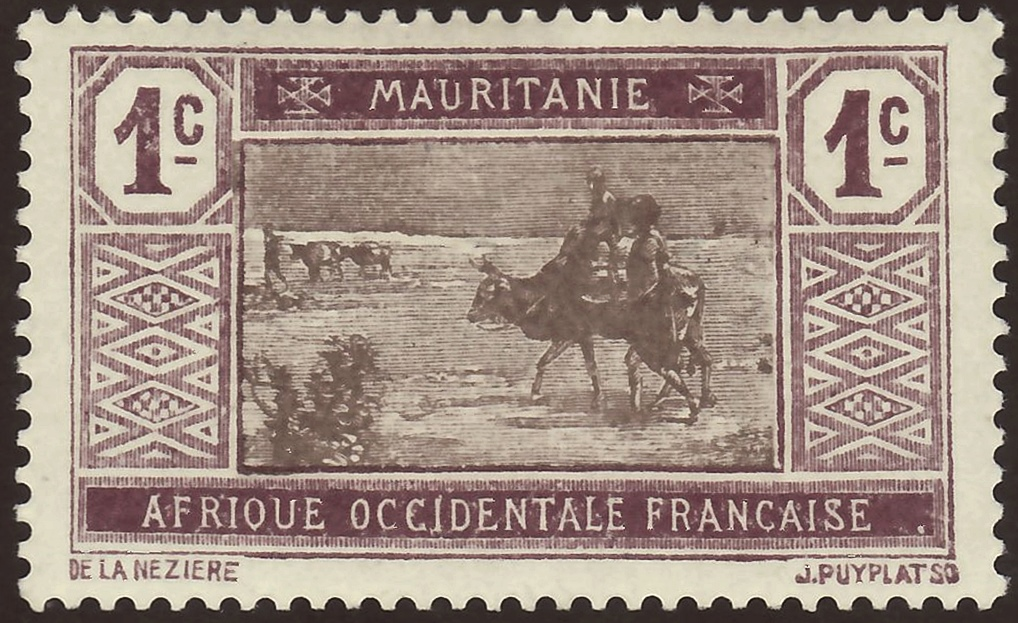
1913 "Crossing desert" issue of Mauritania

Mauritania's first stamps were issued in 1906. Before that, Mauritania used the stamps of Senegal. The 1906 stamps were the common design used in all the French West African territories, featuring General Louis Faidherbe on the low values (1–10 centimes), oil palms on the middle values (20–75 centimes), and Dr. Noel Eugene Ballay, a colonial administrator, on the high values (1–5 francs). The stamps showed both the territory name and the collective designation "Afrique Occidentale Francaise."

== Later issues ==
A long series of definitive stamps followed in 1913 in a common design showing a family crossing the desert, which was in use for 25 years. A new issue in 1938 was used until individual issues for the West African territories were discontinued in 1944. Thereafter, Mauritania used the stamps of French West Africa until independence.

== Independence ==
The first stamps of independent Mauritania were issued on January 20, 1960.

Since independence, Mauritania has issued a moderate number of colorful stamps, usually in denominations intended for normal postal purposes, not exploitation of collectors. Topics range widely, from internationally renowned personages, international organizations, wildlife and marine animals, sports, aviation, etc. The French African CFA franc was in use until 1973, when a new currency, the ouguiya (UM) was introduced at a rate of 1 UM = 5 fr. CFA, resulting in stamp issues in the new currency.

== See also ==
- Postage stamps and postal history of French West Africa
