= Eastern Silesia =

Coordinates: 49°56′N 17°54′E

Eastern Silesia was formerly the Austrian crownland Austrian Silesia, which was occupied by Czechoslovakia after World War I. It had an area of 1,987 sq mi (5,146 km^{2}), with a population of 680,422 in 1900. The capital was Opava. Plans for a plebiscite fell through, and the area was divided between Czechoslovakia and Poland.

The territory was entered by the Czech military on 23 January 1919, after negotiations with Poland broke down. A final agreement on the border was reached on 28 July 1920.

== Postage stamps ==
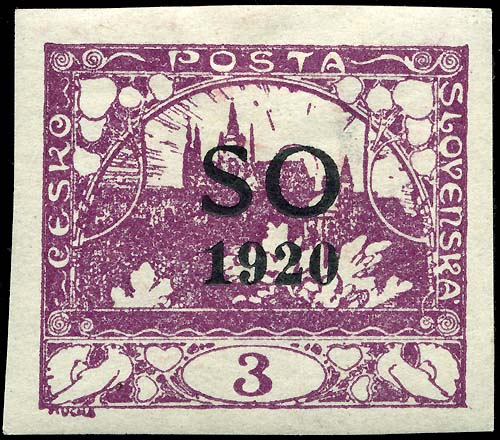
Overprint on imperforate Hradcany 3-haleru stamp of Czechoslovakia.

Eastern Silesia is remembered today by philatelists, since the plans for the plebiscite included the issuance of special postage stamps. These were stamps of Czechoslovakia and Poland, overprinted with various combinations of "SO" or "S. O." (Fr. Silesie Orientale), and "1920". They were in use from February to September 1920. The overprints were produced in considerable numbers; with a few exceptions, the stamps are commonly available today at the minimum price.

The postal history of the territory is quite complicated, with both overprinted and unoverprinted stamps of the contending countries (and Austria) in use at different post offices at different times.
