= Postage stamps and postal history of the Maldives =

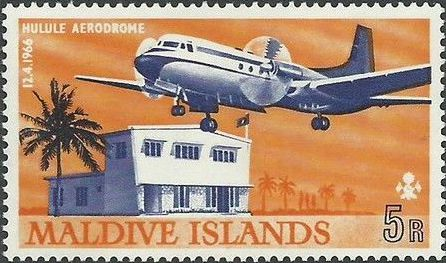
A 1967 stamp featuring the Hulhulé Airport

This is a survey of the postage stamps and postal history of the Maldives.

The Maldive Islands are located in the Indian Ocean and are formed by a double chain of twenty-six atolls stretching in a north-south direction off India's Lakshadweep islands, between Minicoy Island and Chagos Archipelago. They stand in the Laccadive Sea, about seven hundred kilometers south-west of Sri Lanka.

== First stamps ==
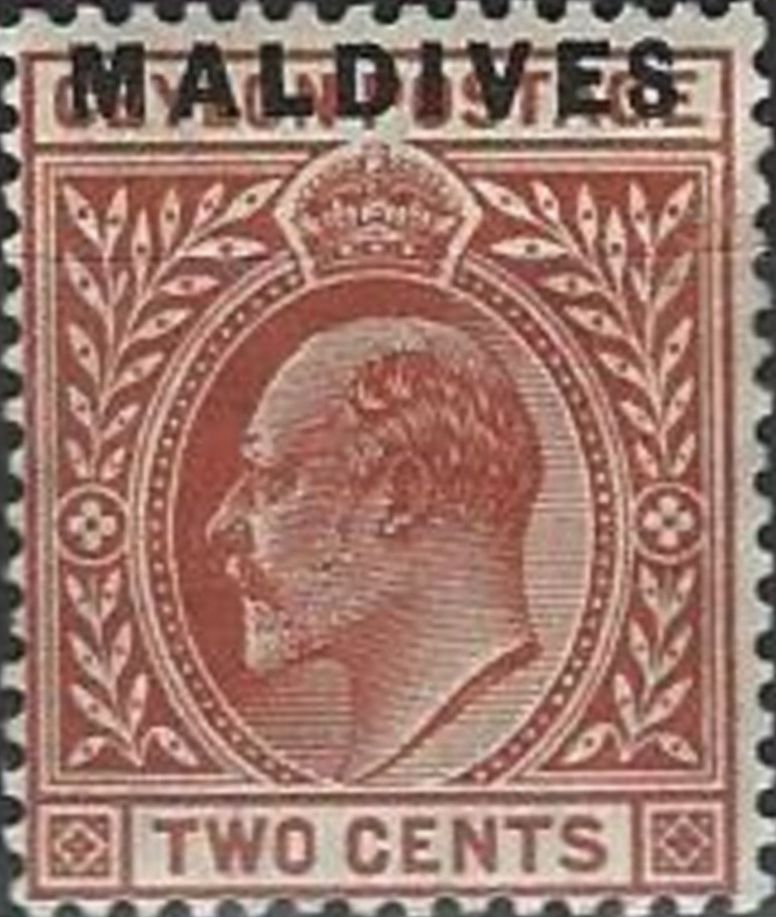
Stamp of Ceylon overprinted for the Maldives, 1906

The first stamps used in the islands were overprinted stamps of Ceylon issued on 9 September 1906. When those ran out, un-overprinted stamps of Ceylon were used.

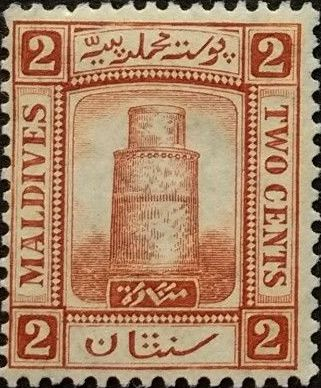
The 1909 series depicting a minaret

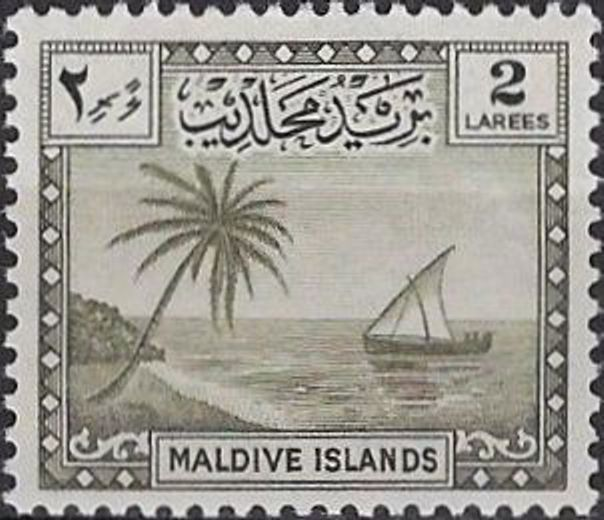
A 1950 stamp of the Maldives Islands

The first stamps inscribed "Maldives" were issued on 15 May 1909.

== Independence ==
On 26 July 1965, the sultanate gained independence from the United Kingdom.

In 1968, the Republic of Maldives was established.

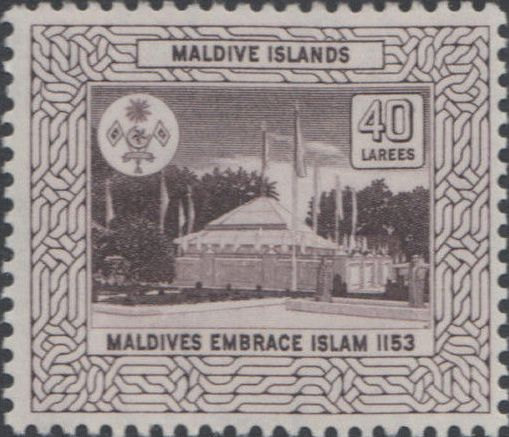
1964 issue commemorating Islam in the Maldives
