= Postage stamps and postal history of the Orange Free State =

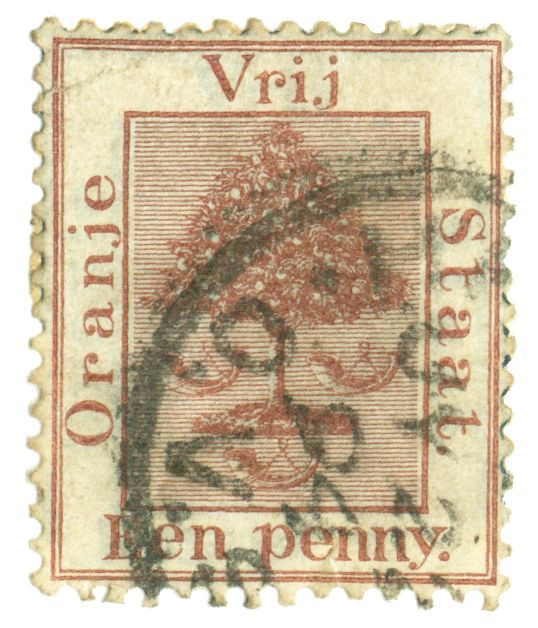
An 1868 stamp of the Orange Free State

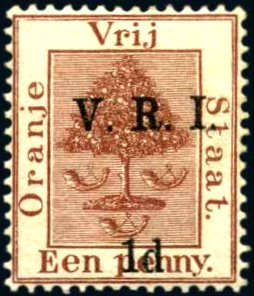
A stamp of the Orange Free State overprinted V.R.I. in 1900 during the British occupation

The Orange Free State was an independent Boer republic in southern Africa during the second half of the 19th century.

The Orange Free State was annexed to the British Crown and renamed the Orange River Colony on 28 May 1900. In 1910 this colony along with Cape of Good Hope, Natal and Transvaal formed the Union of South Africa.

== Postage stamps ==
The first Orange Free State stamps were issued in 1868. The sole design used was an orange tree, with the inscription "Oranje Vrij Staat" in the margin. The stamps were typographed by De La Rue and Company, and came in denominations from one penny to five shillings, in various colours. Periodic shortages forced the use of overprints, in 1877, 1881, 1882, 1888, 1890, 1892, 1896, and 1897. The stamps of the republic are generally common today, but some of the overprints are scarce. Many kinds of overprint errors are known (inverted, double, etc.), and some of them command high prices.

In 1900, the British occupied the Republic and the previous stamps were overprinted "V.R.I." (Victoria Regina Imperatrix, Latin for Victoria, Queen and Empress) and the same value of the original stamps. The colony was renamed in August 1900 and used Cape of Good Hope stamps overprinted with the new name "ORANGE/RIVER/COLONY." In 1902 a single 6d stamp was overprinted as the original occupation issues but with "E.R.I." (Edward Rex Imperator, for Edward VII) instead of "V.R.I.". In 1903 a set was issued portraying King Edward VII, a springbok and a gnu. This set was printed again in 1905–1909, and is the last set of the colony.

== Revenue stamps ==
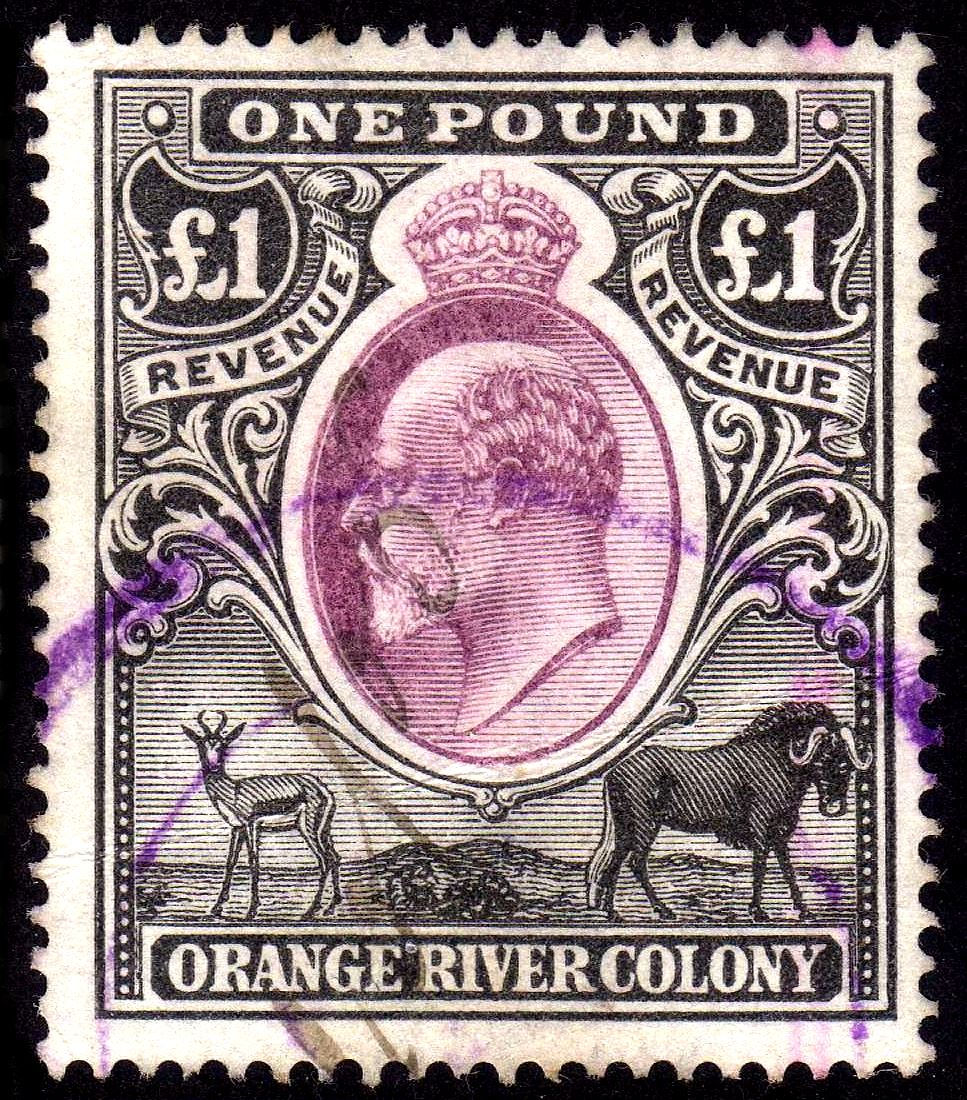
A used £1 1903 Orange River Colony revenue stamp

A variety of revenue stamps were issued both for the Orange Free State and the Orange River Colony. The Orange Free State revenues were also postally used.
