= Postage stamps and postal history of Serbia =

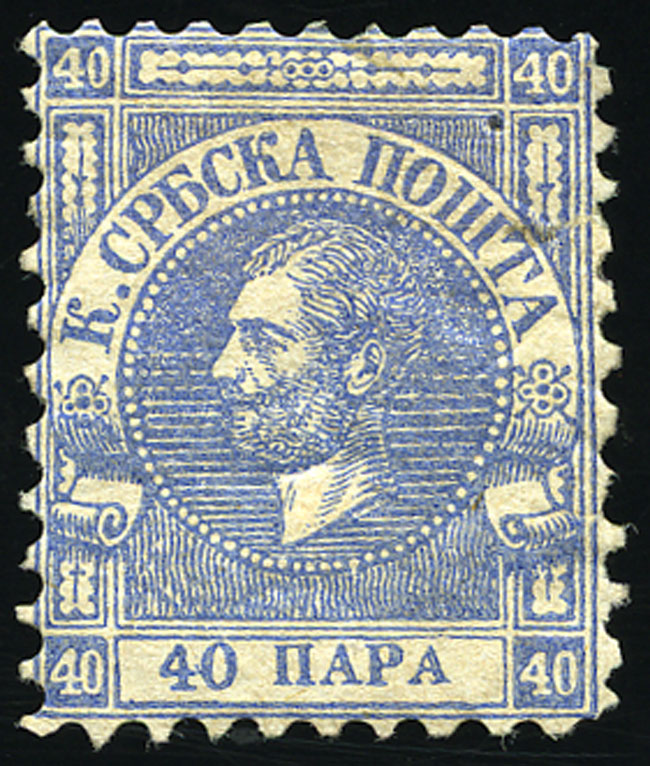
An 1866 stamp with Prince Michael III

This is a survey of the postage stamps and postal history of Serbia, including their historical context, design, and philatelic significance.

== History ==
=== Principality of Serbia (1866–1881) ===
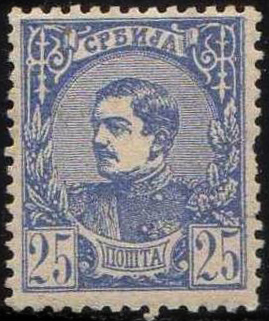
An 1880 stamp with Prince Milan

The Principality of Serbia began issuing its own stamps in 1866. The first issues were typographed stamps featuring Prince Michael III and were primarily used for domestic mail. Early production was often locally printed, leading to variations in color and perforation that are now highly sought after by collectors.

=== Kingdom of Serbia (1881–1914) ===
In 1881, Serbia was elevated to a kingdom under Milan I of Serbia. Stamps from this period included portraits of the royal family, state symbols, and commemorative issues for national events. Some notable series included the "Obrenović" definitive stamps and early pictorial designs featuring Serbian architecture and landscapes. These stamps were printed using lithography and later engraving.

=== World War I ===
During World War I, Serbia was occupied by Austro-Hungarian forces. Stamps of Bosnia and Herzegovina overprinted "Serbien" were issued for the occupied territories. Postal services were disrupted, and mail often required special transit arrangements.

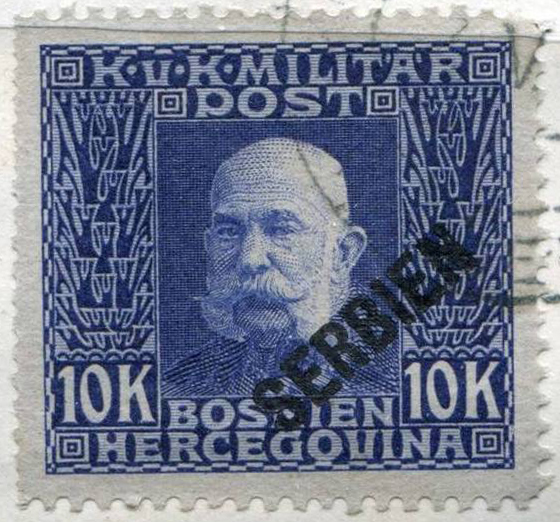
Postage stamp for Serbia under Austro-Hungarian occupation, 1916

=== Kingdom of Serbs, Croats, and Slovenes / Kingdom of Yugoslavia (1918–1941) ===
After the formation of the Kingdom of Serbs, Croats and Slovenes in 1918, the postal system was integrated with former Austro-Hungarian territories. Stamps issued during this period often commemorated national unity, royal events, and international exhibitions.

=== World War II (1941–1944) ===
After the German occupation in 1941 and establishment of the Government of National Salvation, Serbia issued overprinted Yugoslav stamps initially inscribed Serbien and later bilingual with Србија. Stamps depicted local landmarks, military themes, and national symbols under strict censorship.

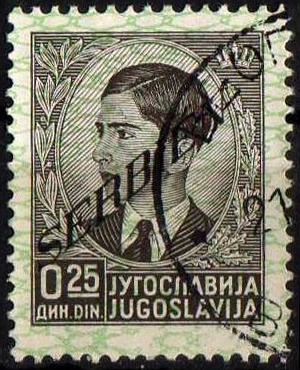
A Yugoslav stamp overprinted Serbien in 1941

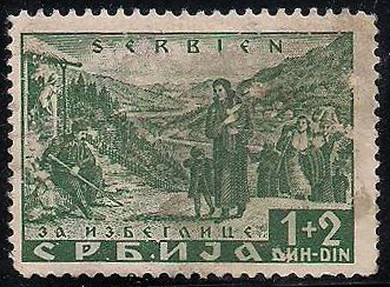
Postage stamp for Serbia under German occupation in 1941

=== Post-war Yugoslavia (1944–2006) ===
From 1944 onwards, Serbia was part of the Socialist Federal Republic of Yugoslavia. Stamps featured socialist themes, historical figures, cultural achievements, and industrial progress. Philatelic catalogs from this period document a wide variety of issues, commemoratives, and airmail stamps.

== Modern Serbia (2006–present) ==
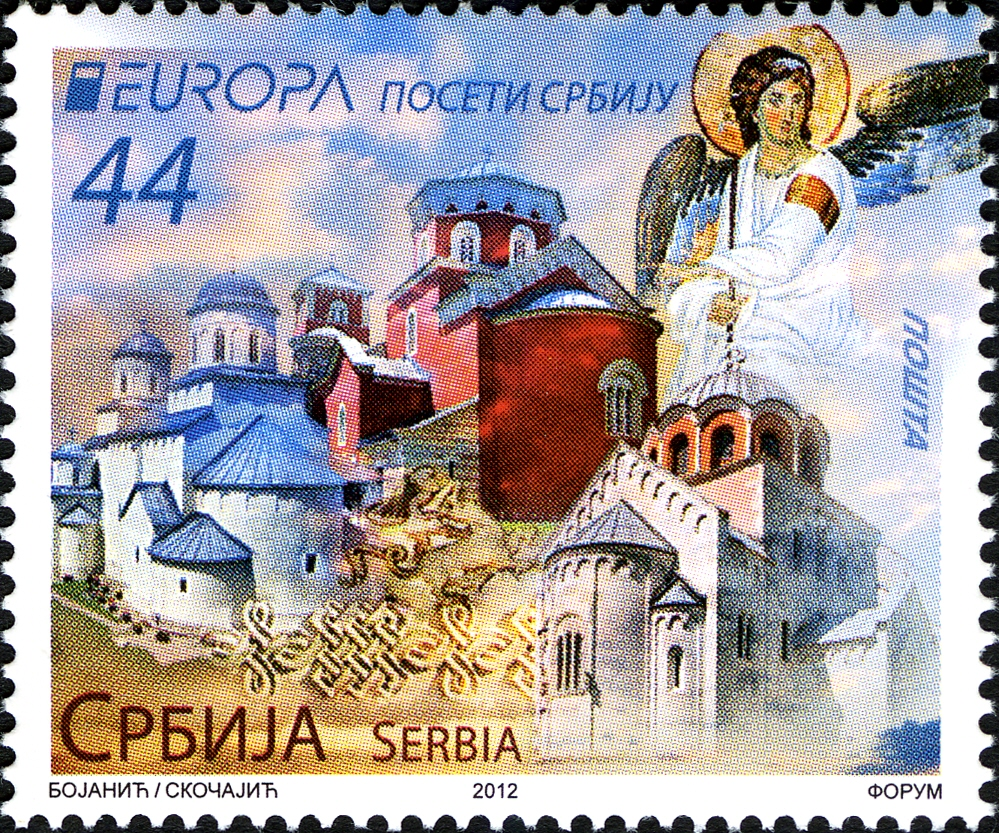
A 2012 stamp of Serbia

After the dissolution of Serbia and Montenegro in 2006, Serbia resumed issuing its own stamps. The Post of Serbia continues to produce definitive, commemorative, and Europa series stamps. Modern issues often highlight Serbian culture, natural heritage, sport, and historical anniversaries. Advanced printing techniques, including photogravure and holographic security features, are commonly used.

== Philatelic significance ==
Serbian stamps are highly valued by collectors for their historical context, design variations, and rarity. Early issues and wartime overprints are particularly sought after. Modern stamps also play a role in cultural diplomacy and the promotion of national heritage.
