= Postage stamps and postal history of Elobey, Annobón, and Corisco =

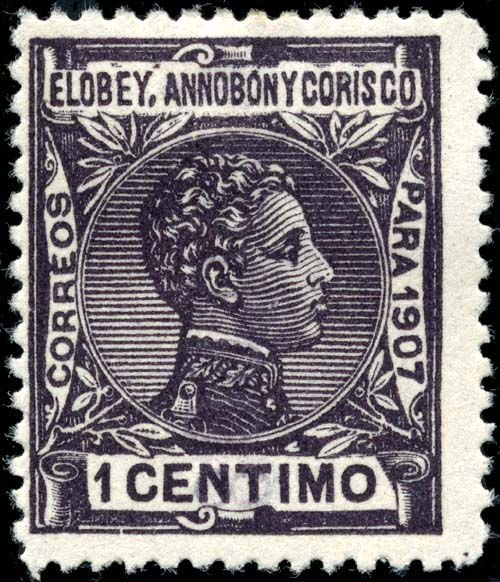
Elobey, Annobón, and Corisco: 1 céntimo, 1907

Elobey, Annobón, and Corisco was a colonial administration of Spanish Africa located in the Gulf of Guinea. The colony consisted of the small islands of Elobey Grande, Elobey Chico, Annobón, and Corisco. The capital was Santa Isabel. The islands are presently part of Equatorial Guinea.

The colony is remembered by philatelists for having issued its own postage stamps between 1903 and 1910. The first issue depicted a profile of the young Alfonso XIII of Spain, and consisted of 18 values, from 1/4 centimos to 10 pesetas. The values from 1c to 10p were reprinted in 1905, but inscribed "1905".

In 1906, the 1c, 2c, 3c, and 4c values were surcharged 10c, 15c, 25c, and 50c, using a box with the value and "1906". A 1907 set of 16 values updated to a profile of an older Alfonso. Several of these values were surcharged between 1908 and 1910. A total of 72 issues are identified in the Yvert catalogue. Stanley Gibbons lists 69 issues from 1903 to 1909.

Subsequently, the islands used the stamps of Spanish Guinea.

== See also ==
- Postage stamps and postal history of Equatorial Guinea

== Bibliography ==
- Bentley, G.W. "The Stamps of Fernando P, Elobey, Anobon and Corisco and Spanish Guinea." The Philatelist and P.J.G.B. No. 44 (1944), p. 64.
- Stanley Gibbons Ltd, various catalogues
- Stanley Gibbons Ltd, Europe and Colonies 1970, Stanley Gibbons Ltd, 1969
- Stuart Rossiter & John Flower, The Stamp Atlas, W H Smith, 1989
- XLCR Stamp Finder and Collector's Dictionary, Thomas Cliffe Ltd, c.1960
