= Postage stamps and postal history of Solomon Islands =

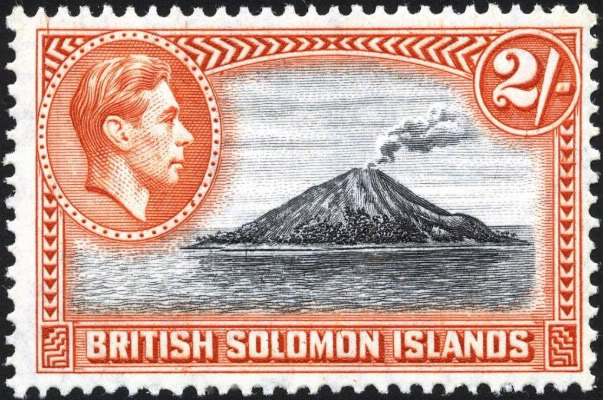
A 1939 two shilling stamp of the British Solomon Islands showing Tinakula Volcano

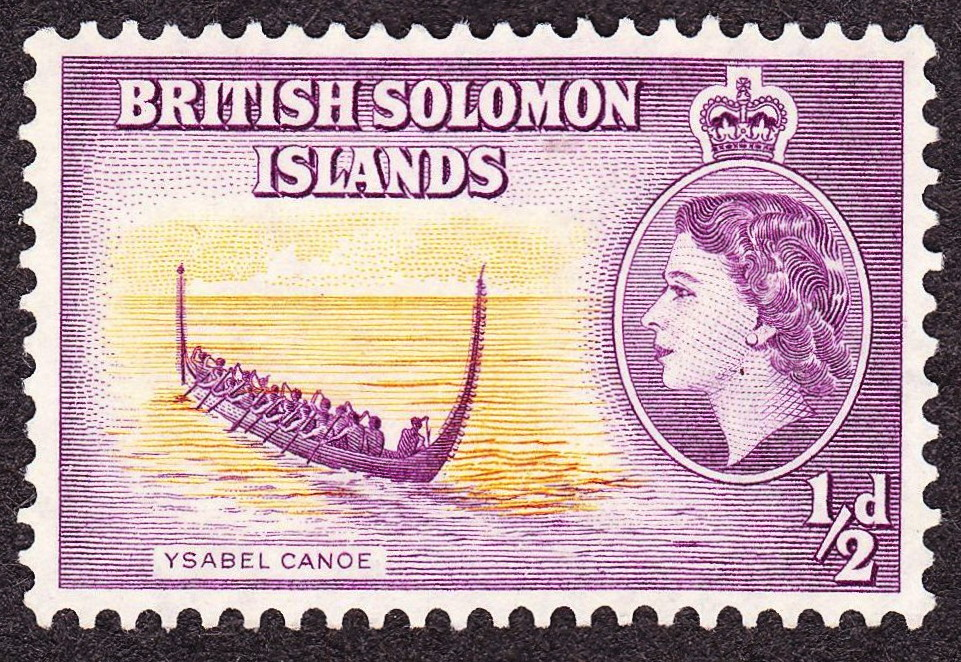
A 1956 half penny stamp of the British Solomon Islands

Solomon Islands is a sovereign nation state since 1978, formerly a British protectorate known as the British Solomon Islands. They comprise nearly 1,000 islands and lie to the south-east of Papua New Guinea.

The first mails from the islands are believed to be those sent by the British Resident Commissioner, Charles Woodford, who was appointed in 1896 and established an administrative centre at Tulagi. Letters were sent in a sealed bag to Sydney where New South Wales stamps were affixed. Later, a stock of New South Wales stamps was kept at Tulagi and the stamps were cancelled in Sydney. From April 1906, Woodford used a paid handstamp instead and stamps were again added in Sydney.

On 14 February 1907, the first postage stamps were issued in the Solomon Islands, marked British Solomon Islands Protectorate.

From 1913, stamps were marked British Solomon Islands.

From 1975, leading up to independence in 1978, stamps were marked "Solomon Islands" and all stamps since then have been so marked.
