= Postage stamps and postal history of Bahawalpur =

A 1948 stamp from Bahawalpur

A 1949 stamp from Bahawalpur

This is a survey of the postage stamps and postal history of Bahawalpur.

== First stamps ==
Bahawalpur used the postage stamps of British India until 1945. On 1 January 1945, it issued its own stamps, for official use only, a set of pictorials inscribed entirely in Arabic.

== Commemorative stamps ==
On 1 December 1947 the state issued its first regular stamp, a commemorative stamp for the 200th anniversary of the ruling family, depicting Mohammad Bahawal Khan I, and inscribed "BAHAWALPUR". A series of 14 values appeared 1 April 1948, depicting various Nawabs and buildings. A handful of additional commemoratives ended with an October 1949 issue commemorating the 75th anniversary of the Universal Postal Union. After this the state adopted Pakistani stamps for external mail. Bahawalpur stamps continued to be valid for internal mail until 1953.

== See also ==
- Postage stamps and postal history of Pakistan
