= Postage stamps and postal history of the Far Eastern Republic =

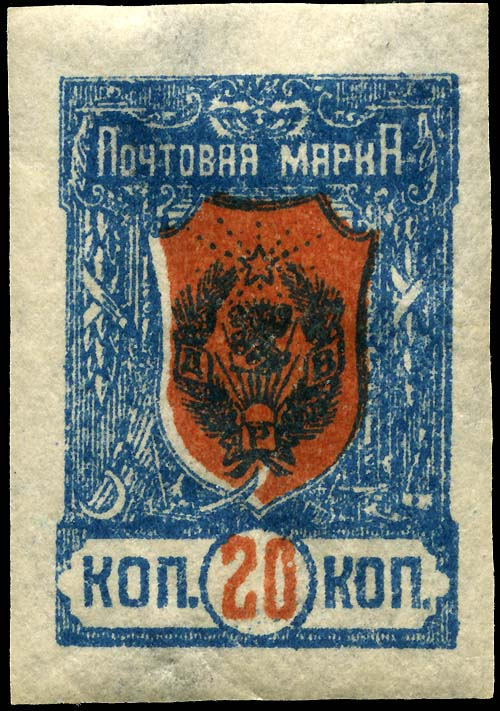
A stamp of the F.E.R. 1921 Chita issue.

The Far Eastern Republic, sometimes called the Chita Republic, existed from April 1920 to November 1922 in the easternmost part of Siberia. It was formed from the Amur, Transbaikal, Kamchatka, Sakhalin, and Primorye regions. In theory, it extended from Lake Baikal to Vladivostok but, in May 1921, the Priamur and Maritime Provinces seceded. Although nominally independent, it was largely controlled by the RSFSR and its main purpose was to be a democratic buffer state between the RSFSR and the territories occupied by Japan during the Russian Civil War to avoid war with Japan. Initially, its capital was Verkhneudinsk (now Ulan-Ude), but from October 1920 it was Chita. On 15 November 1922, after the war ended and the Japanese withdrew from Vladivostok, the Far Eastern Republic was annexed by Soviet Russia.

== Postage stamps ==
=== Coalition Government ===
In 1920 the RSFSR, by agreement with the communists, social revolutionists and social democrats, formed a three-party coalition government called the "Far Eastern Republic" (F.E.R.). The first Chairman of the F.E.R. was Alexander Krasnochekoff. In September 1920 this government ordered its Central Postal Administration to collect all stocks of the remaining tsarist postage stamps from all post offices in the area of the F.E.R. Large supplies of the Imperial Russian 1909–1917 'Arms' issue were on hand at the main post office of Khabarovsk and also at Vladivostok. At first mail was franked with these 'Arms' stamps and the still-current Kolchak (Siberia) overprinted stamps. This introduced the danger of revenue loss due to imported 'Arms' stamps. The decision was hence made to overprint all the 'Arms' stamps with the Russian initials 'DBP' meaning "Far Eastern Republic" (Russian: Дальне-Восточная Республика, romanized: Dalne-Vostochnaya Respublika), and to accept only overprinted stamps for franking within the F.E.R. The exact issue date remains uncertain; sources mention November 23 as well as December 12, 1920.

After the 'DBP' or DVR overprinted stamps were exhausted, four different new stamps modelled on the Tsarist 'Arms' type of 1909–1917 were printed in 1921 in Vladivostok. The exact issue date is unknown; estimates of production numbers range from 600,000 to 1,000,000.

=== Priamur Provisional Government, Merkulov ===
In May 1921 a White movement coup d'état took place in Vladivostok. The new authorities there declared the abolition of the F.E.R. government and formed the Priamur Provisional Government (Russian: Временное Приамурское Правительство, romanized: Vremennoye Priamurskoye Pravitel'stvo; VPP). headed by the brothers Spiridon Merkulov and Nikolai Merkulov. On May 22, 1922, an overprint was applied by the Vladivostok State Bank to four of the 1921 definitive issues consisting of an oval and '26.V.1921–1922'. It commemorated the first anniversary of the Merkulov government. The stamps were to be used in the Southern Primorsk Oblast. Issue numbers were low, about 2,000.

In addition to these overprints a representative of the Merkulov government had the Tsarist 'Arms' type of 1909–1917 overprinted in 1921 at Nikolayevsk-on-Amur. The overprint bears the letters 'N na A/PVP', and the new gold-kopeck values. It was done by handstamp since all the printing works in Nikolayevsk-on-Amur had been destroyed.

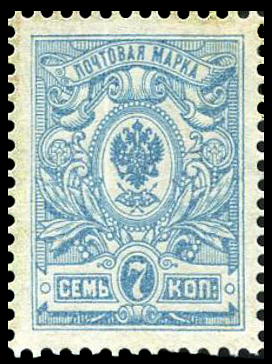
Russia 1908 Tsarist 'Arms' issue

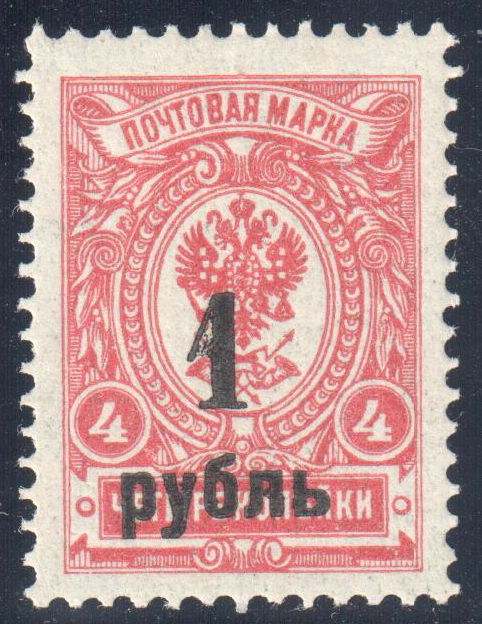
Kolchak 1919 overprint issue

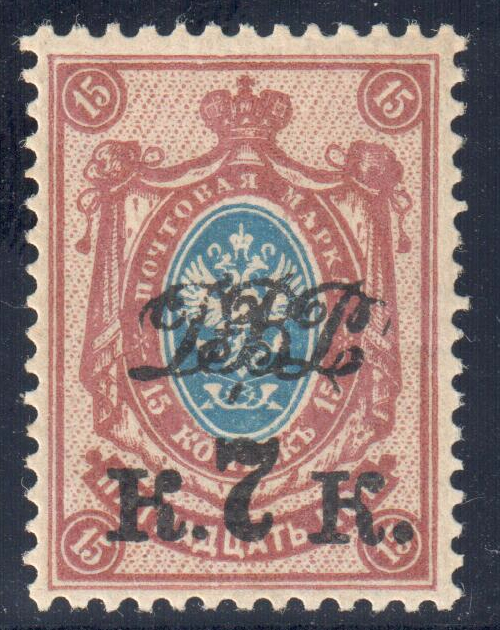
F.E.R. 1920 DVR overprint issue

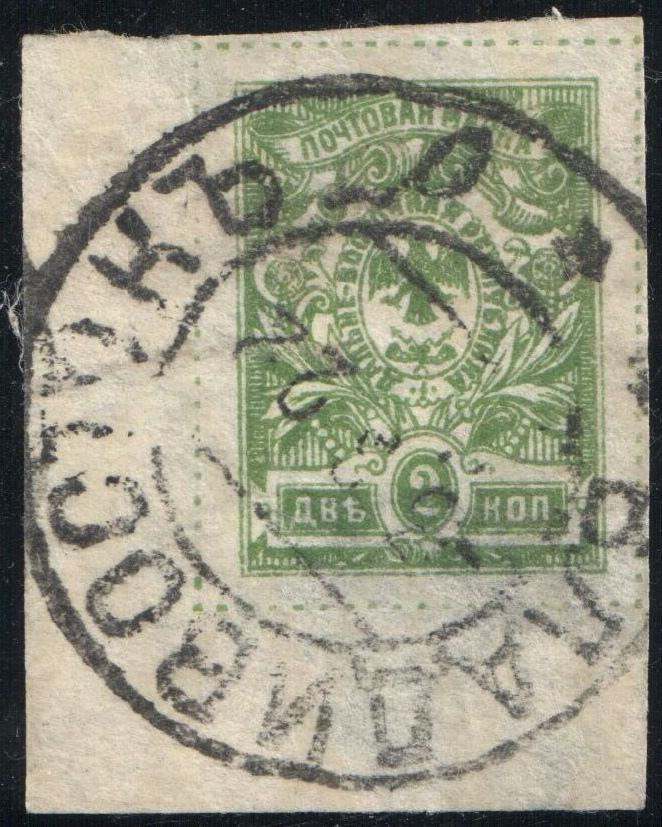
F.E.R. 1921 Vladivostok 'Arms' issue

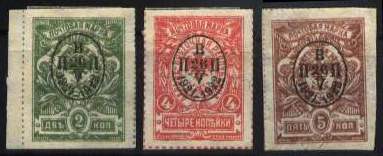
Merkulov 1922 issue

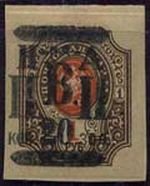
Nikolayevsk-on-Amur 1921 issue

=== Priamur Rural Area Government, Diterikhs ===
The local population administered by the rural assembly ('Zemskoe Sobranie') was discontented with the Merkulov government. The rural assembly appointed General Mikhail Konstantinovich Diterikhs (Russian: Михаи́л Константи́нович Ди́терихс) as Governor and military commander of the rural armed forces (Zemskaya Rat) of the Priamur Zemstvo territory. Shortly after his appointment, Diterikhs overthrew the Merkulov government, and renamed the area 'Priamurskii Zemskii Krai' (Priamur Rural Area). Diterikhs did not recognize the F.E.R. and had the 'DVR', the 1921 regular issues and Imperial Russian 1909–1917 'Arms' issue overprinted 'Priamurskii Zemskii Krai'. The stamps were overprinted by the Vladivostok State Bank between August and September 1922, and used in the Southern Primorsk Oblast between September and December 1922.

=== Military Revolutionary Committee ===
In October 1922 the Japanese evacuated the Maritime Province and Diterikhs, defeated by the F.E.R. army on 14 October 1922, fled abroad. The Bolsheviks took Vladivostok on 25 October 1922 and set up a Military Revolutionary Committee. 10,000 Sets definitive stamps of the F.E.R. were overprinted '1917.7.XI.1922', commemorating the fifth anniversary of the October Revolution, and issued on November 7, 1922. These stamps were used until early 1923.

The F.E.R. ceased to exist as an independent state on November 15, 1922. During 1923 and early 1924 various Siberian stamp issues remained in circulation, mostly the Chita issues.

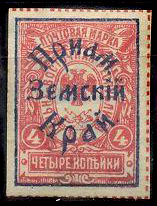
Diterikhs 1922 issue

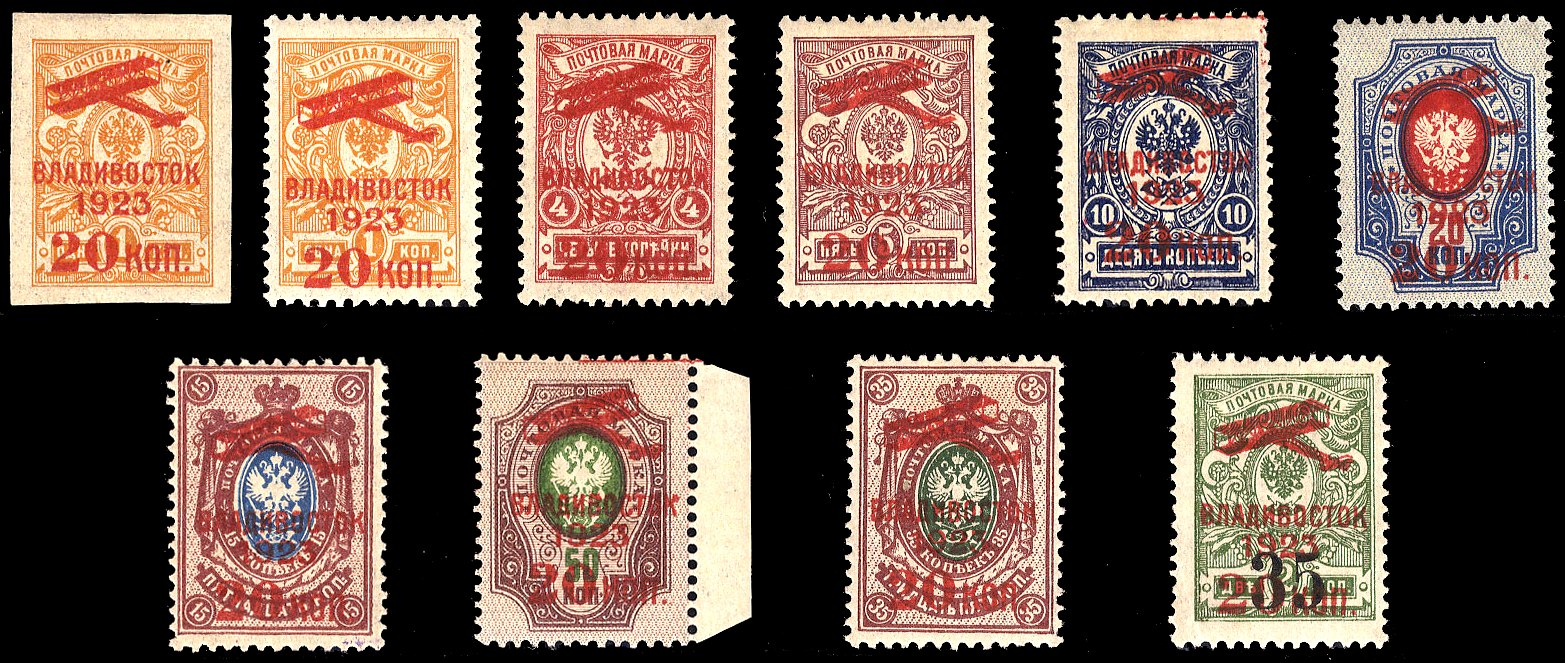
Vladivostok 1923 air post issues

== Postal stationery ==
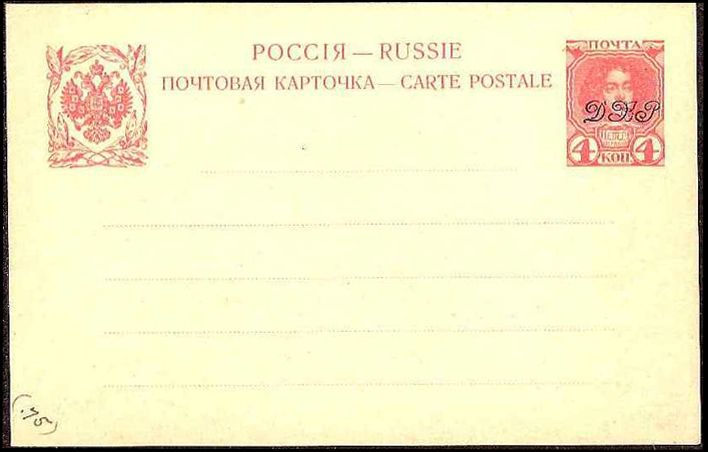
A 1920 postal stationery card of the F.E.R. overprinted 'DVR'

In 1920 the Coalition Government had Postal stationery produced by overprinting Tsarist Russian postal cards and newspaper wrappers which already had different designs of impressed stamp applied to show that postage had been pre-paid. Similar to the stamps the overprint consisted of the Russian initials 'DBP' meaning Far Eastern Republic (Dalne-Vostochnaya Respublika), and was placed horizontally on the imprinted stamp.

Four different postal cards were used. Postal cards of 3 kopeks (1909), 4 kopeks (Romanov card of 1913) 5 kopeks brown (Kerensky card of 1917) and 5 kopeks reply card (Kerensky card of 1917) were overprinted.

Tsarist wrappers of 1890 and 1891, the 1 kopek orange and 2 kopek green were used. Four different wrappers can be distinguished although some catalogues subdivide each 2 kopek wrapper into two types with differences in size, making a total of six different wrappers.

== Collecting stamps and postal stationery of the Republic of the Far East ==
Several of the above stamps were produced in large numbers, and are readily available today, while others are very rare. Genuine usages on cover are seldom seen for some issues, and are somewhat scarce for most. Some alleged stamp issues of the Far Eastern Republic should be treated with caution, as there is no evidence they were ever postally used. These include the so-called Nikolaevsk-on-Amur issue and the 1923 Vladivostok Airmail issue. Fantasy issues also exist, such as the "Pribaikal" overprints.

The stamps and postal stationery of the Russian civil war period are a complex topic giving an advanced collector a great philatelic challenge.

=== Stamp societies ===
- ArGe Russland/UdSSR Arbeitsgemeinschaft Russland/UdSSR e.V. is a German-based Russian philatelic society
- BSRP British Society of Russian Philately is a British-based Russian philatelic society
- The Rossica Society of Russian Philately is a US-based Russian philatelic society

== See also ==
Russian Civil War

- Provisional Priamurye Government
- Siberian Intervention
- White movement
- Russian Civil War

Postage stamps and postal history

- Postage stamps and postal history of Russia
- Compendium of postage stamp issuers, Russian Civil War

Catalogues

- Michel catalog
- Scott
- Stanley Gibbons
- Yvert
