= Postage stamps and postal history of Senegal =

This is a survey of the postage stamps and postal history of Senegal.

Senegal is a country south of the Sénégal River in western Africa. It is externally bounded by the Atlantic Ocean to the west, Mauritania to the north, Mali to the east, and Guinea and Guinea-Bissau to the south; internally it almost completely surrounds the Gambia, namely on the north, east and south, exempting Gambia's short Atlantic Ocean coastline.

== First stamps ==
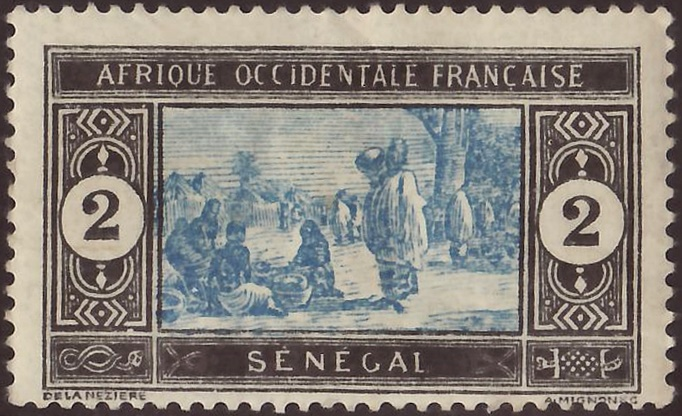
A 1914 stamp of Senegal

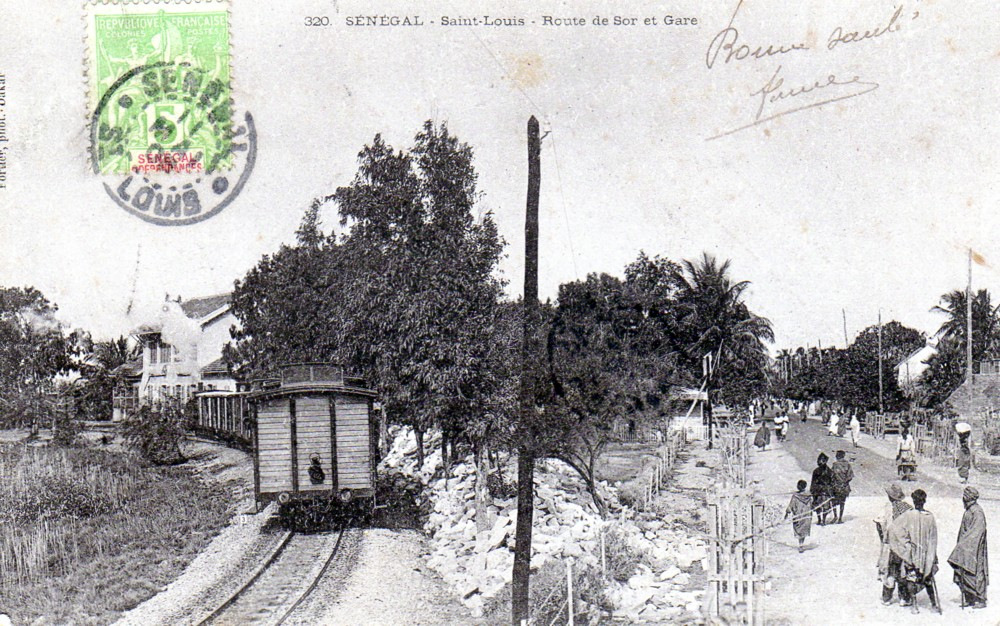
An 1892 stamp of Senegal on a postcard cancelled at St. Louis

The first stamps of Senegal were issued in 1887. Before that general issues for the French Colonies were used.

== French West Africa ==
From 1944 to 1959, the French West Africa issues were used. The last issue of French West Africa was the Stamp Day issue on March 21, 1959, which was inscribed "CF" along with "Dakar-Abidjan" and used only in Ivory Coast and Senegal.

== Mali Federation ==
In 1959 and early 1960 nine stamps were issued in the name of the short-lived Federation of Mali which consisted of Senegal and French Sudan. They depict symbols of the Federation with a series of fish and a common issue with some other of former French colonies in Africa. But tensions quickly arose between the two states of the new federation. Senegal then seceded, while the former Sudan retained the name of Mali, as well as the use of the Federation stamps.

== Republic ==
Stamps for the Republic of Senegal were first issued in 1960.

== See also ==
- Postage stamps of the French Colonies
- Postage stamps and postal history of French West Africa
- Postage stamps and postal history of Mali
