= Postage stamps and postal history of Vanuatu =

A modern stamp miniature sheet of Vanuatu depicting explorers

This is a survey of the postage stamps and postal history of Vanuatu, formerly known as the New Hebrides, an island group in the South Pacific. Between 1906 and 1980, the islands were an Anglo-French Condominium.

One of the outcomes of this arrangement was that both countries issued their own postage stamps for the islands, although towards the end of the Condominium, there were joint issues with the initials EIIR (Elizabeth II Regina) for the UK, and RF (République Française) for France.

== British issues ==
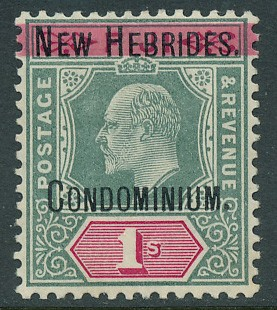
Stamp of Fiji overprinted 'New Hebrides Condominium', 1908

The first British issues, in 1908 and 1910, were produced by overprinting stamps of Fiji with "NEW HEBRIDES / CONDOMINIUM". These were followed by a joint issue with the French authorities, inscribed "NEW HEBRIDES" over a design including the coats of arms of both France and Britain and denominated in British currency. These were in use for several years, but as the stocks ran out in 1920, the less-popular values had to be surcharged "1d." and "2d.". New stamps in different colours came in the following year, but further surcharges became necessary again, in 1924.

1925 saw another joint issue of nine values similar to the 1911 stamps, but this time both pence and centime denominations appeared on the same stamp. The British version had the pence (or shilling) denomination on the right side, and was printed on the "multiple crown and script CA" watermark paper, while the French version had the centimes on the left, was inscribed "NOUVELLES HEBRIDES", and printed on paper watermarked "R F"; otherwise they appeared identical.

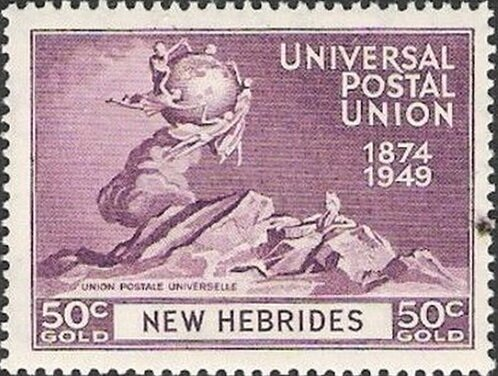
A British version of the 1949 U.P.U. issue of New Hebrides

The dual denomination scheme broke down when the value of the French franc declined, and for the next stamp issue, in 1938, the two administrations had simplified matters by using the same currency of "gold francs". The twelve values of the 1938 issues all depicted the same "beach scene", including huts, palm trees, a canoe, and a volcano in the distance. The stamps were inscribed "NEW HEBRIDES" at the top and "CONDOMINIUM" at the bottom. A standard Commonwealth 75th anniversary of the UPU issue followed in 1949, and a definitive issue in 1953. 1956 saw a set of four values commemorating the 50th anniversary of the condominium, and another set of definitives in 1957. Subsequent issues were mostly the common issues of the Commonwealth, with New Hebrides-specific issues appearing from 1967 onwards.

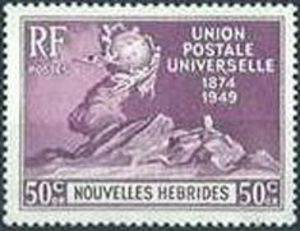
A French version of the 1949 U.P.U. issue of New Hebrides

== French issues ==
The first issues of the French, also in 1908 and 1910, were overprints on the stamps of their colony New Caledonia, in 1908 reading just "NOUVELLES HEBRIDES" and in 1910 adding "CONDOMINIUM". The joint issue of 1911, inscribed "NOUVELLES HEBRIDES" with denominations in centimes, was at first printed on British paper, then in 1912 on French paper watermarked "R F". As with the British, surcharged provisionals became necessary in 1920.

French issues of 1925 and 1938 were analogous to their British counterparts, but in 1941, the 1938 stamps were overprinted "France Libre" to signify that the Free French Forces were in control instead of Vichy France.

Postwar issues were generally consistent with British versions, differing primarily in being inscribed in French.

== Vanuatu ==
Modern stamps have been issued under the name Vanuatu since independence in 1980.

== Local stamps ==
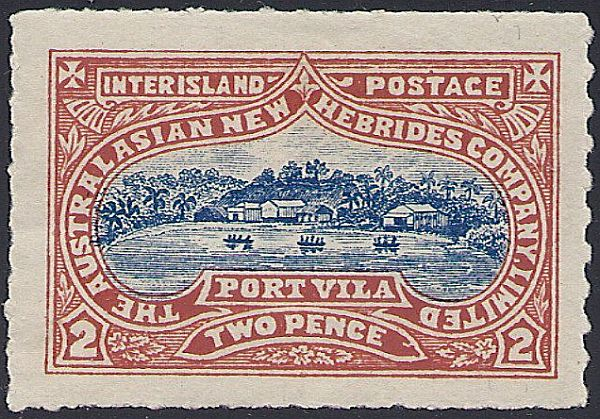
1897 Australasian New Hebrides Company 2d stamp

In 1897 a local inter-island postal service was started by the Australasian New Hebrides Company for which two local stamps were issued. The service failed and the remaining stock of stamps was later sold to stamp dealers.

== See also ==
- Vanuatu Post The national post office of Vanuatu.

== References and sources ==
Sources

- Stanley Gibbons Ltd: various catalogues
- Encyclopaedia of Postal Authorities
- Rossiter, Stuart & John Flower. The Stamp Atlas. London: Macdonald, 1986. ISBN 0-356-10862-7
