= Postage stamps and postal history of Saudi Arabia =

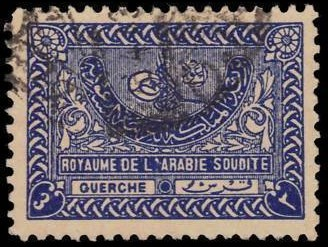
A 1938 stamp of Saudi Arabia

This is a survey of the postage stamps and postal history of Saudi Arabia, formerly known as the Kingdom of Hejaz and Nejd until 22 September 1932. The Kingdom of Hejaz and Nejd had been separate countries until the mid-1920s.

Saudi Arabia is the largest Arab country of the Middle East. It is bordered by Jordan and Iraq on the north and northeast, Kuwait, Qatar, Bahrain and the United Arab Emirates on the east, Oman on the southeast, and Yemen on the south. The Persian Gulf lies to the northeast and the Red Sea to its west. It has an estimated population of 28 million, and its size is approximately 2,149,690 square kilometres (830,000 sq mi).

== Pre-stamp era ==
Hejaz, in the western part of Arabia came under Turkish influence in 1517 and the Turks took direct control in 1845. Before the introduction of postage stamps and the railway, the limited amounts of mail that was sent traveled mainly by camel.

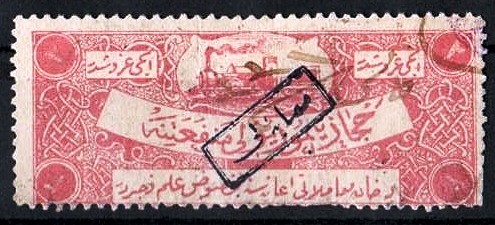
A revenue stamp for the Hejaz railway

Between 1900 and 1908 a railway was built between Medina and Damascus known as the Hejaz railway and a number of railway stamps were issued for use on the service. Revenue stamps were also issued in connection with the financing of the railway.

The Turks operated post offices at Abha or Ebha, El Ula, Hedye, Jeddah, Konfida, Mecca, Taif, Tebouk and Yanbo, and an Egyptian post office operated at Jeddah between 1865 and 1881.

== The Kingdom of Hejaz ==
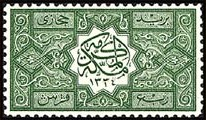
The first stamp of Hejaz, 1916

Hejaz achieved independence from the Ottoman Empire in 1916. The first stamps of Hejaz were issued in October 1916. Stamps continued until 1925 and the many issues are noted for their complexity with many different printings and overprints which are often found inverted.

== Nejdi occupation of Hejaz ==
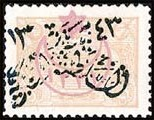
Stamp overprinted during the Nejdi occupation of Hejaz

By 1925 Nejd had conquered the Kingdom of Hejaz. A variety of stamps were issued during the occupation, including postage stamps, railway stamps, postage dues and revenue stamps. Many were overprinted, including Turkish stamps made valid for postage in the territory.

== The Kingdom of Hejaz and Nejd ==
On 8 January 1926, the Sultan of Nejd, Abdul Aziz Ibn Saud, was crowned King of the Hejaz in the Grand Mosque of Mecca. On January 29, 1927, he also took the title King of Nejd, as opposed to the earlier Sultan. At the Treaty of Jeddah on May 20, 1927, Abdul Aziz's realm was recognized by the United Kingdom and was addressed as the Kingdom of Hejaz and Nejd.

The first stamps of the new kingdom were issued in February 1926 and a number of other series were issued up until 1932.

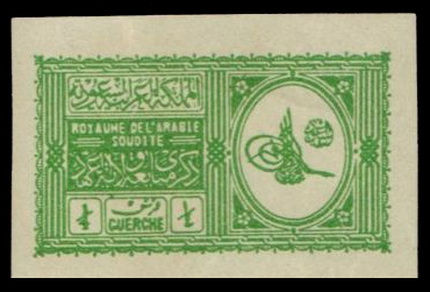
The first stamp of Saudi Arabia, 1934

== First stamps of Saudi Arabia ==
The first stamps marked Saudi Arabia were issued on 1 January 1934.

Regular issues have continued up to the present time, mostly on subjects relevant to life in Saudi Arabia and including a number of long-running definitive series.

== Modern era ==
On May 20, 1980, the Saudi government issued a set of two commemorative anti-smoking postage stamps to coincide with that year's April 7 World Health Day theme entitled "Smoking or health? The choice is in your hands." To modernize its service, Saudi Post built three new postal centers in Dammam, Riyadh, and Jeddah as part of its 1981–1985 Five Year Development Plan; stamps commemorating the centers were released on July 14, 1982, and the centers themselves opened to the public the following year. With Saudi Arabia having hosted the 1989 FIFA World Youth Championship, the kingdom issued two commemorative football-themed stamps on February 16, 1989, one day before the tournament began. In June 2023, Saudi Post collaborated with the Ministry of Hajj and Umrah to issue a special stamp and postcard set commemorating that year's Hajj pilgrimage.

== See also ==
- Saudi Post
