= Postage stamps and postal history of Macau =

This is a survey of the postage stamps and postal history of Macau (or Macao).

== Early colonial history ==
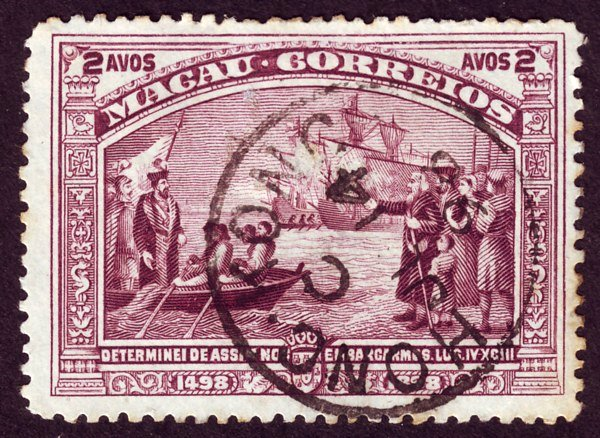
An 1898 stamp of Macau commemorating the quatercentenary of Vasco de Gama's discovery of the sea route to India

The first stamps issued for Macau, appearing in 1884, used the common "Portuguese crown" design for nine values ranging from 5 to 300 reis. Later in 1884, an 80-reis value was produced as a surcharge on the 100-reis value; in 1885 an 80-reis value of the crown design went on sale. Also in 1885, five values were re-issued in new colors. Shortages of values continued through 1887, resulting in a variety of surcharges on both postage stamps and revenue stamps.

New stamps in 1888 depicted Luis I with an embossed profile. Luis died soon after, and in 1894 a new series of 12 values featured a portrait of Carlos I. Also in 1894 the currency was changed to avos and rupees, 78 avos to the rupee (this would change to 100 avos to the pataca in 1913). In response leftover Luis stamps were surcharged in various avos values, in both Latin and Chinese characters, along with the word "PROVISORIO".

In 1898 both the Vasco da Gama issue of commemoratives, and a new series of Carlos designs, were all denominated in avos. Shortages of particular values were a regular occurrence from 1900 through 1910, resulting in nearly 40 types of surcharges, as well as postage due stamps pressed into regular service by overprinting obliterating bars on the "PORTEADO" and "RECEBER" text of those stamps.

== Post-revolution history ==
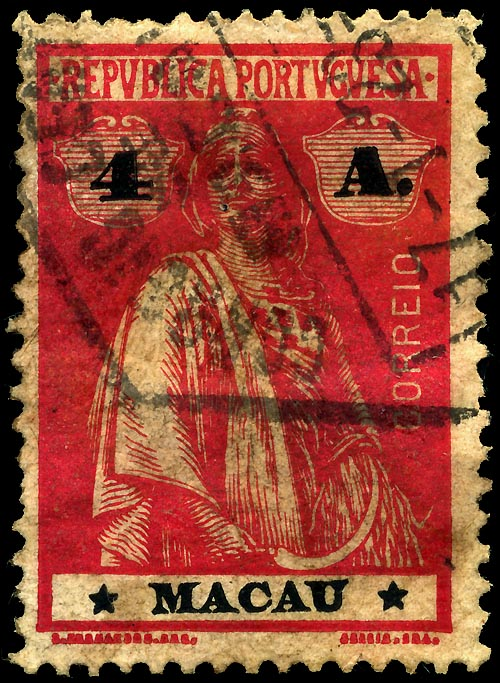
A 1913 Ceres stamp of Macau

In the wake of the revolution of 1910, the government overprinted stocks of the Carlos stamps with "REPUBLICA" and shipped those out to Macau. The turbulent situation required some creativity on the part of local officials, and in 1911, they produced 2a and 5a values by overprinting the new value diagonally in upper right and lower left corners of 4a and 10a stamps, then bisecting them on the diagonal. In 1913, they also applied a Republica overprint to a variety of older stamps going back to 1898.

The Ceres series of 1913 was a fresh start for all the Portuguese territories, ultimately adding up to 29 value/color combinations (up to 5 patacas) through 1924. Even so, in 1915 additional Republica overprints were needed on the surcharges of 1902 (themselves overprinted on 1888 and 1894 issues. Between 1931 and 1933, nine lesser-used values of the Ceres stamps were surcharged.

On 1 February 1934, a new definitive series used a design with an allegorical figure representing "Portugal" and Vasco da Gama's flagship São Gabriel. They were surcharged in 1941, and eight values were reprinted in 1942. The reprints were lithographed (instead of typographed as were the 1934 printings) on a thin paper, roughly perforated.

Macau participated in the Empire issue of 1938, with 17 values.

In 1948, a new definitive series consisted of 12 values with different pictorial designs depicting local scenery. Subsequent issues included many of the common design types issued for all the Portuguese territories, with some commemoratives for anniversaries in Macau. Macau's 1976 acquisition of "special territory" status gave it more autonomy in its handling of the post, and starting in 1981 it issued a variety of more-appealing designs relating to local geography and culture, generally in sets of 4–6 related designs.

== Post-transfer of sovereignty history ==
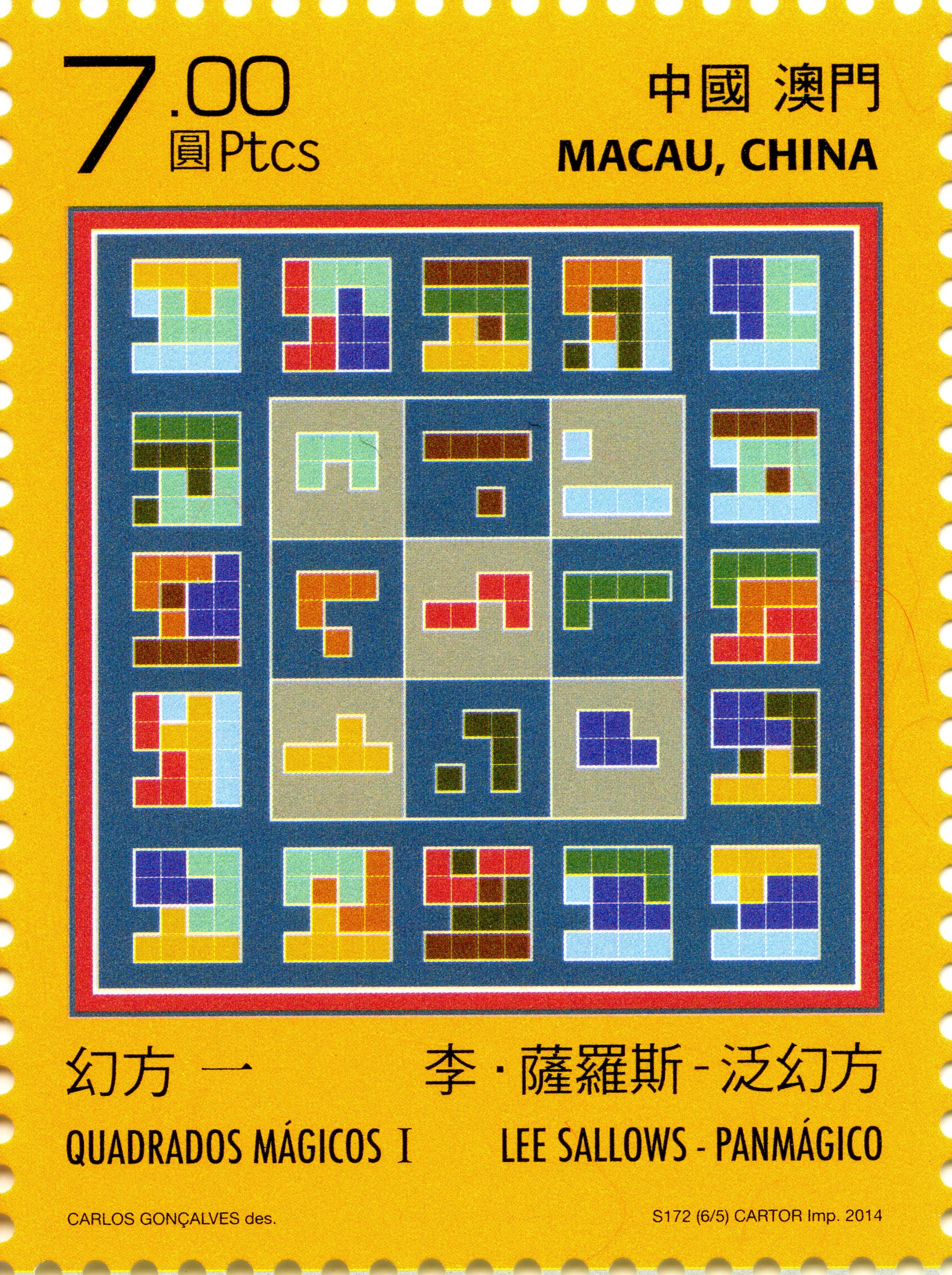
A 2014 stamp of Macau

The main effect of the 1999 transition to special administrative region status was a change in the inscription on the stamps: from "MACAU" along with "REPÚBLICA PORTUGUESA" in smaller print somewhere on the stamp, to "MACAU, CHINA".

== Sources ==
- Scott catalog
- Yang's Catalog of the Postage Stamps and Postal Stationery of Macau (1998)
- Stanley Gibbons Ltd: various catalogues
- Encyclopaedia of Postal Authorities
- Rossiter, Stuart & John Flower. The Stamp Atlas. London: Macdonald, 1986. ISBN 0-356-10862-7
