= Postage stamps and postal history of San Marino =

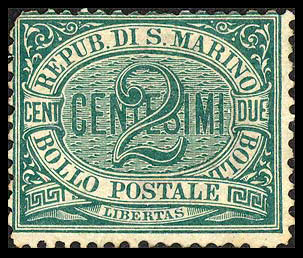
A 1877 San Marino stamp

The postal history of San Marino can be traced to October 7, 1607, with the introduction of public postal services. The republic's postal needs were handled by a post office in nearby Rimini, Italy; the first San Marino post office opened in 1833.

== History ==
When postage stamps were introduced in the mid-19th century, San Marino signed a postal treaty with Italy to use Italian stamps for its mail. On March 2, 1877, a new agreement was signed between the two countries that enabled San Marino to issue its own stamps.

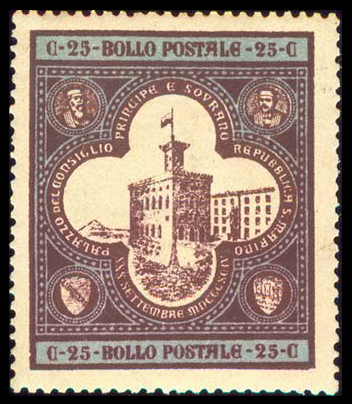
The first commemorative issue of San Marino marking the commissioning of the Palazzo Pubblico in 1894

The first San Marino postage stamps were a definitive stamps consisting of two designs covering seven denominations. The stamps, which depicted the coat of arms of the republic with the Three Towers of San Marino at Monte Titano (except the 2-centesimi stamp), were created by the design firm Fratelli Pellas in Genoa and printed on Italian watermarked paper by the Officina Carta e Valori in Turin. The first Commemorative stamps were introduced in 1894.

Over the years, San Marino's stamps—known for their eye-catching designs and distinctive, often triangular shapes—have gained widespread popularity among stamp collectors worldwide. It is estimated that 10% of the republic's revenue is generated by the sale of its postage stamps to international collectors. The government of San Marino has the world's only philatelic minister of state, Simone Celli, who carries the title (in Italian) La Segreteria di Stato per le finanze, il bilancio e la programmazione, l'informazione, i rapporti con l'azienda autonoma di stato filatelica e numismatica (State Secretariat for Finance, Budget and Planning, Information, Relations with the Autonomous Philatelic and Numismatic Company).

== List of people on stamps of San Marino ==
- Luciano Pavarotti, Italian operatic tenor (2010)
- Andrea Palladio, Venetian architect (2008)
- Concetto Marchesi, Italian politician (2008)

== See also ==
- Poste San Marino, the current post office.
