= Postage stamps and postal history of Paraguay =

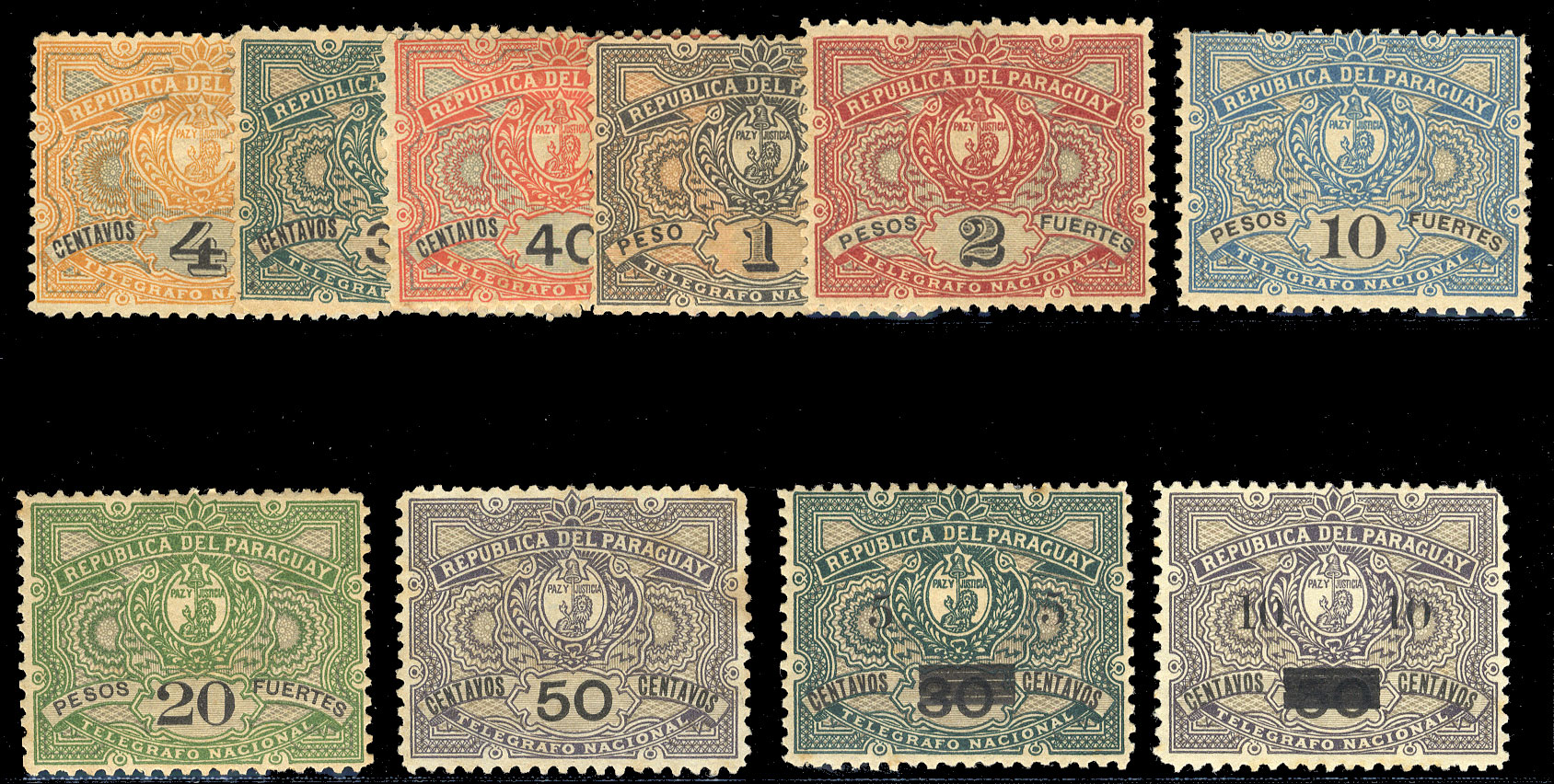
1892 Telegraph stamps of Paraguay with two (bottom right) surcharged for postal use in 1900

Paraguay gained independence from Spain in 1811.

== Pre-stamp era ==
Paraguay operated an internal postal service from 1769 to 1811. Mail travelled from Buenos Aires via Santa Fe and Corrientes to Candelaria and Asuncion.

== First stamps ==
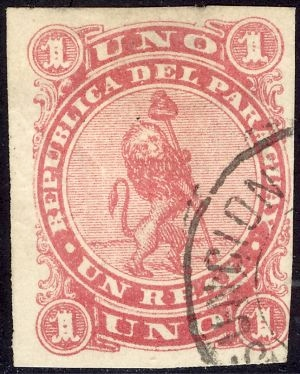
1 real first issue 1870, pink, litho, cancelled at Asuncion

The republic of Paraguay issued its first stamps (1, 2, and 3 Reales) on 1 August 1870, featuring a standing lion raising a republican hat, lithographed by R. Lange (Buenos Aires).
