= Postage stamps and postal history of Mozambique =

This is a survey of the postage stamps and postal history of Mozambique.

== First stamps ==
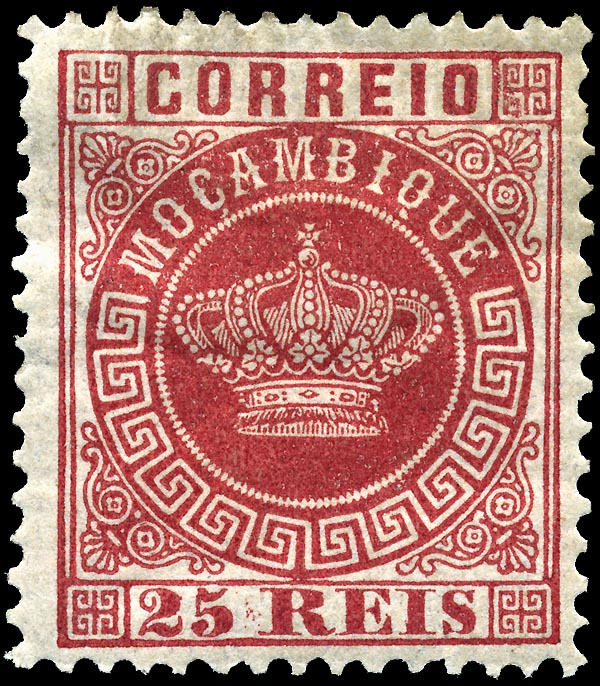
An 1877 stamp of Mozambique

Stamps date from 1877, with the same key type design of the Portuguese crown as used elsewhere in the Portuguese territories. The original nine values were followed up by color changes in 1881 (10r and 40r) and 1885 (20r, 25r). These were followed by the King Luiz issue in 1886.

== District issues ==
In the 1890s, stamps were issued for the districts of the colonial administration, Zambezia, Inhambane, and Lourenço Marques, and the district of Mozambique, for use in each area. In 1898, King Carlos I was the subject of a lengthy series, which by 1903 numbered 23 colors and denominations.

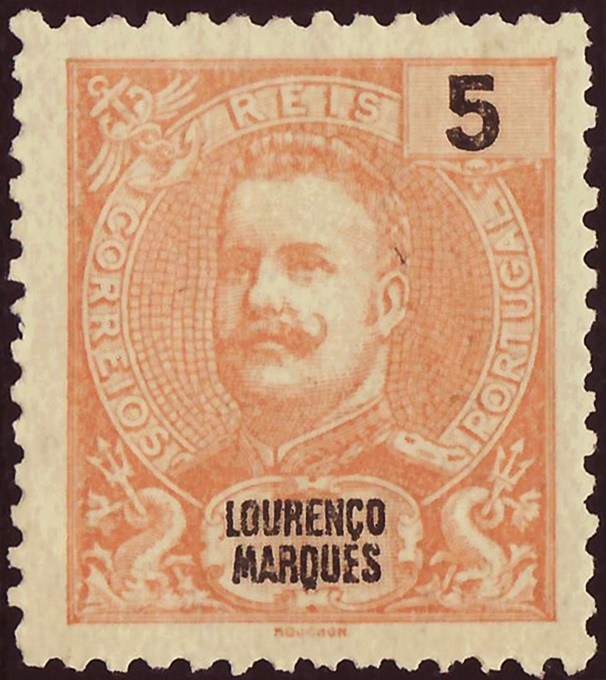
Stamp for Lourenço Marques, 1898

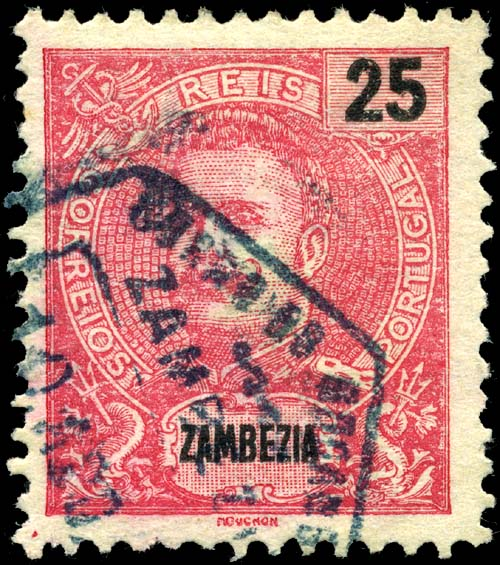
Stamp for Zambezia, 1903

In 1913, the postal districts of Quelimane and Tete were created from Zambezia, and separate stamps were issued. All districts shared the Ceres design. Issues for the districts ended in 1920, in favor of stamps valid through Mozambique.

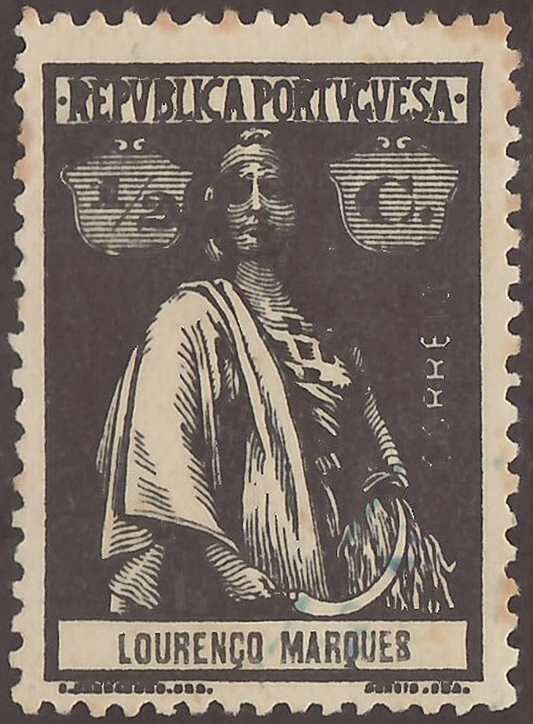
1914 Ceres series

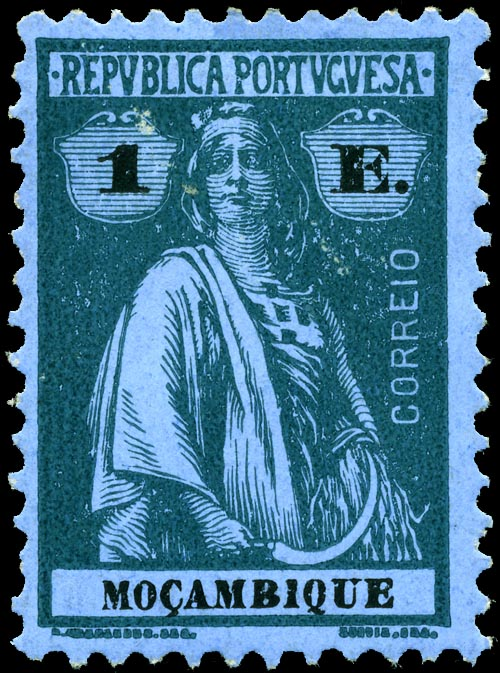
1914 Ceres series

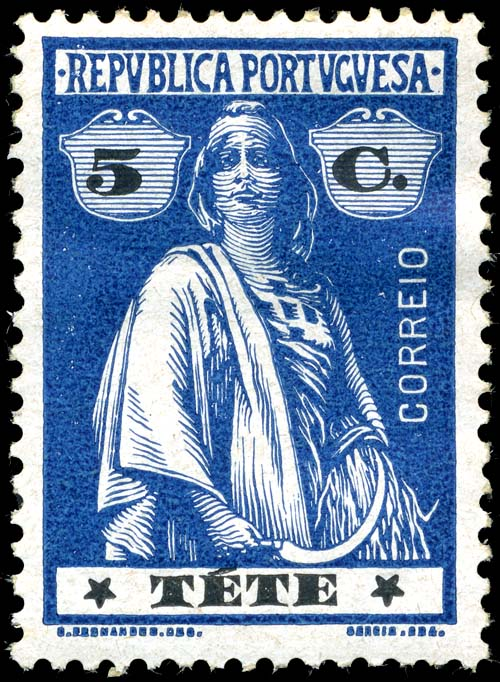
1914 Ceres series

== Twentieth century ==
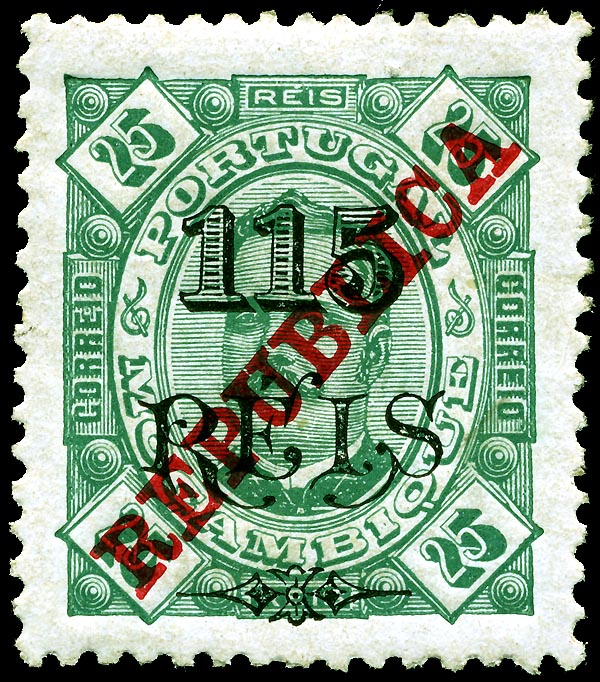
King Carlos I stamp overprinted "REPUBLICA" in 1915

The 1910 revolution resulted in a variety of overprints reading "REPUBLICA" on both the existing stamps and on previously-unissued stamps depicting Manuel II of Portugal.

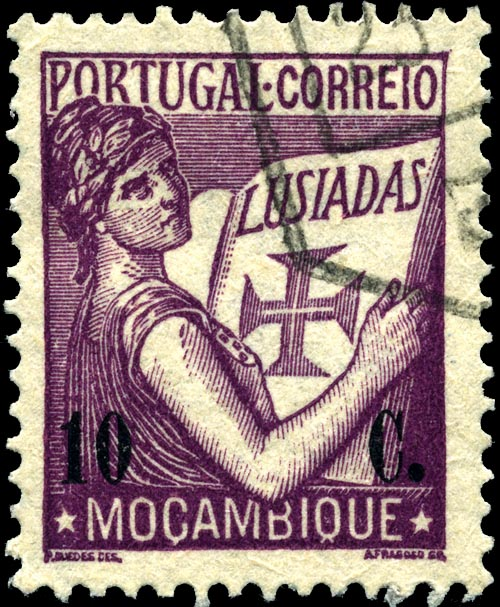
1933 Lusiad issue

Various expediencies required a variety of surcharged stamps throughout the 1920s. In 1933, the Lusiad issue became standard, followed by the Empire issue in 1938.

Postwar issues followed the general pattern for the Portuguese colonies. A 1948 definitive series featured a variety of local scenery, while a 1951 series of 24 stamps depicted fish in full color. A 1953 series showed butterflies and moths, while the 1961 series included the coat of arms of various Mozambique cities. The 1963 series showed historic ships, while in 1967 the theme was soldiers.

== Since independence ==
1998 Mozambique stamp featuring an image of a coelacanth

The Lusaka Agreement of 1974 was marked in January 1975 with a philatelic design consisting of a stylized bird formed from Portugal's and Mozambique's flags. On June 25, 1975, many existing stamps, some going back as far as 1953, were issued with an overprint marking independence.

Issues in independent Mozambique have been relatively restrained and focus on local subjects. Philatelic issues are frequently released in sets of four-to-six stamps. For instance, in 1985, there were 10 issues, of which three were single commemoratives, five were sets of four, and the remaining two were sets of six.

== Kionga issues ==
The Kionga Triangle was a tiny territory on the border between German East Africa (present-day Tanzania) and Portuguese Mozambique occupied by the Portuguese forces in 1916. On May 29, 1916, stamps from Lourenço Marques were overprinted with "KIONGA".

== Private postal systems ==
In 1891, the Mozambique Company was chartered to administer the Manica and Sofala areas, for which they issued their own stamps until 1942.

They were followed by the Nyassa Company in 1898, whose stamps continued until 1929.

== See also ==
- Postage stamps and postal history of Zambezia
- Postage stamps and postal history of Inhambane
- Postage stamps and postal history of Tete
- Postage stamps and postal history of Kionga
- Postage stamps and postal history of the Nyassa Company

== Sources ==
- Scott catalogue
