= Portuguese conquest of Angónia =

Conquest of Angónia
- Part of Portuguese campaigns of pacification and occupation
Date	Late 1899
Location	Angónia District, Mozambique
Result	Portuguese victory

Belligerents
Kingdom of Portugal	Kingdom of Angónia

Commanders and leaders
António Júlio de Brito	Mandala

Strength
50 sepoys	Unknown

The Conquest of Angónia was one of the Portuguese campaigns of occupation and pacification that took place in late 1899, which contributed to the formation of the current territory of Mozambique.

== History ==
In the mid-19th century, several European powers, including Portugal, embarked on the partitioning of Africa, and the Berlin Conference defined the principle of effective occupation of the continent's interior.

Between January and May 1898, the British King's African Rifles regiment defeated the great Nguni chief Mpeseni in Northern Rhodesia along with the rulers of Nyasaland. The Nguni kingdom of King Gomani I extended to both sides of the border from Angónia in Mozambique and present-day Malawi, but when the king died in battle, power in his kingdom was divided between Mandala, the king's brother, and Mlangeni, mother of King Cikusi, Gomani's predecessor.

In May 1899, the governor of Quelimane, Eugénio de Oliveira Soares de Andrea, appointed the young naval lieutenant António Júlio de Brito as "resident" (consul) of Angónia. Accompanied by 50 sepoys, he settled in Mkodza-Kodza at the end of 1899, "a bold move that left the divided Angónia people astonished." By then, the northwest population of Angónia were in decline and, after the arrival of the Portuguese, they no longer spoke the native language. Angónia was incorporated into Portuguese territory as a Prazo da Coroa and granted to the Zambezia Company. The Prazo of Angónia was later leased to Sena Sugar Estates.

Between April and June of 1900, Mandala revolted against Portuguese authority but was defeated by António Júlio de Brito and his sepoys in Mtapa and arrested on 8 August 1900. The following day, António Júlio de Brito also defeated and arrested Pemba, Mukawira, Kabango, Junga, Zissane and Mlageni, who were sent to Tete but Mandala committed suicide with poison, while Mlageni was sent to Quelimane. The Nguni warriors were incorporated into the troops of Lourenço Marques (present-day Maputo) and Mozambique.

As for António Júlio de Brito, the people of Angónia made him their King and he resigned from the navy to live in Angónia. He became known as "Brito da Angónia".

Agreements for the demarcation of the border between Mozambique and Nyasaland were signed between Portuguese and British commissions from 31 of July to 21 of November 1899 and on 8 of December 1900. An exchange on 15 of September 1906 provisionally confirmed the demarcation with some corrections.

== See also ==
- Portuguese Mozambique
- Portuguese conquest of the Gaza Empire
- Portuguese conquest of Barue
- Angónia
