= Imprensa Nacional-Casa da Moeda =

Portuguese state press and mint

National Printing House and Mint
- Imprensa Nacional – Casa da Moeda, SA
- National Printing House and Mint logo

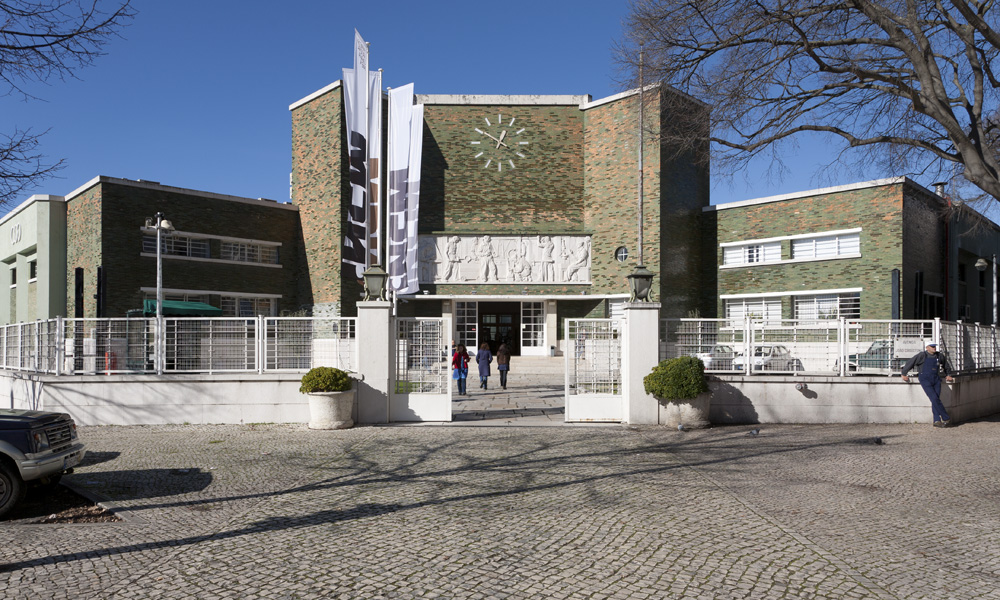
- Headquarters of the National Printing House and Mint in Lisbon

Public limited company overview
- Formed: July 4, 1972; 54 years ago
- Preceding agencies: National Printing House; Mint
- Type: State publisher and mint
- Jurisdiction: Government of Portugal
- Headquarters: Casa da Moeda, Avenida de António José de Almeida, 1000-042 Lisbon, Portugal; 38°44′13.2936″N 9°8′34.5696″W
- Parent Ministry: Ministry of Finance
- Website: Imprensa Nacional Casa da Moeda - INCM

The National Printing House and Mint (Note: Imprensa Nacional – Casa da Moeda, SA) (INCM), is a public limited company of anonymous shareholders administratively subordinated by the Ministry of Finance that acts as the national mint and state publisher of Portugal. It designs and produces a variety of security and information products and services for the Portuguese government, most notable of which are the government gazette and coinage. In addition to currency and publication of the government gazette, the INCM produces passports; identity documents, postage stamps, and several types of certificates. It is located in Lisbon in the Santo António freguesia. (Note: Until 2012, the São Mamede freguesia)

== History ==
The Casa da Moeda was established at least in the late 13th century. It produced legal tender coins and banknotes. It also produced medals and security prints (i.e., passports, subway tokens, postage stamps) that are used and issued by government-run service providers. In 1972 it was merged with the Imprensa Nacional (National Press) into Imprensa Nacional–Casa da Moeda through the Law Decree nr. 225/72 of July 4. Imprensa Nacional–Casa da Moeda (INCM) has the mission of publishing the Official Journal (Diário da República), through which all citizens become aware of the acts that govern the life of Portuguese society. As provided for in art. 119 of the Portuguese Constitution, if the regulatory acts are not published, they have no legal effect.

== Controversies ==
In late 2025, Casa da Moeda became the subject of controversy following reports that the Portuguese state mint was producing two million coins for Israel. According to media coverage and statements from several civil society groups, the project also included an official visit by a delegation of the Israeli government to mark the start of production. The news prompted public condemnation from multiple organizations, including the Movimento pelos Direitos do Povo Palestino e pela Paz no Médio Oriente (MPPM), the Conselho Português para a Paz e Cooperação (CPPC), the Confederação Geral dos Trabalhadores Portugueses (CGTP-IN), and youth associations. These groups argued that cooperation between a Portuguese public company and the Israeli state was incompatible with Portugal's legal obligations under international humanitarian and human rights law. MPPM stated that INCM's association with Israel constituted support to "a state that practices occupation, apartheid, and genocide", referencing findings and advisory opinions from United Nations bodies and the International Court of Justice.

On 25 November 2025, about one hundred demonstrators gathered in front of Casa da Moeda in Lisbon. Participants denounced what they described as the "impunity" of Israel and "complicity" by the Portuguese government. Speakers referenced continuing civilian casualties in Gaza following what they alleged to be repeated violations of the ceasefire by Israeli forces. PCP municipal councillor João Ferreira and CPPC president Isabel Camarinha both criticized the government for pursuing economic cooperation with Israel despite Portugal's recognition of the State of Palestine and ongoing legal proceedings at the International Court of Justice. Vice-president of the MPPM Carlos Almeida argued that any cooperation could render Portugal vulnerable to accusations before the ICJ. CPPC representatives described the coin-production contract as incompatible with Portugal's stated commitment to Palestinian statehood and human rights.

== See also ==
- Portuguese Escudo
