= Niassa Company =

Royal company in the Portuguese colony of Mozambique

Niassa Company Companhia do Niassa
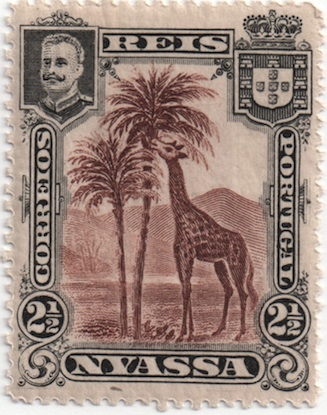
- A stamp issued by the Niassa Company
- Industry: International trade
- Founded: 1891
- Defunct: 1929
- Fate: Dissolved
- Headquarters: Cabo Delgado Province and Niassa Province, Portuguese Mozambique, Portuguese Empire
- Area served: Portuguese Empire

The Niassa Company or Nyassa Chartered Company (Portuguese: Companhia do Niassa) was a royal company in the Portuguese colony of Mozambique, then known as Portuguese East Africa, that had the concession of the lands that include the present provinces of Cabo Delgado and Niassa between 1891 and 1929.

== The History ==
In the late 19th century, Portugal's dominance of Mozambique began to be challenged by the establishment of neighboring British and German colonies. Although the borders of Mozambique had nominally been fixed by the Berlin Conference of 1884–1885, Portugal lacked the capital to exert effective control or economic exploitation of the territory. To help overcome this, in 1891 the Portuguese government authorised three private companies by royal charter to manage portions of Mozambique: the Mozambique Company, the Zambezia Company and the Niassa Company.

The Niassa Company was given a concession which covered the current provinces of Cabo Delgado and Niassa, from the Ruvuma River to the Lúrio River and the Indian Ocean to Lake Niassa, a territory which covered more than 160,000 square km. The terms of the concession were the same as for the Mozambique Company, except for a term of only 35 years. The official charter by the Portuguese government in March 1893.

Although founded by Bernard Daupais, a merchant from Lisbon, his syndicate failed to raise the necessary capital for the company's operations, so from 1892 to 1893 a consortium of French and British capitals bought the concession, moving its headquarters to London. Since most of the territory was Portuguese in name only and had not yet been occupied militarily, this consortium needed to obtain more funds for its operation.

Between 1897 and 1908, three financial groups successively controlled the Niassa Company. The first was the "Ibo Syndicate" which raised enough funds to establish an administrative center in the village of Ibo in 1897. In 1899 the "Ibo Syndicate" became the "Ibo Investment Trust", which raised a small army provided by the Portuguese colonial administration, consisting of 300 Portuguese soldiers and 2800 "sepoys" (Indians recruited in other regions of Mozambique). From 1900 to 1902, the company was successfully able to occupy the inland regions of the concession, including Metangula on the banks of Lake Niassa.

In 1904 the Niassa Company founded the town Porto Amélia, which is now known as Pemba, and Porto Amélia became the headquarters of the company.

Around that time, the company discovered a lucrative source of income. The first local labor supply contracts were drawn up for the Witwatersrand Native Labour Association (WENELA), as an official Mozambican recruiter for the mines in South Africa. The Niassa Company was dominated by "Nyassa Consolidated" from 1908, with strong participation of South African mining capital. By recruiting for the South African mines, the Niassa Company came into direct competition against the Moslem tribal chiefs, notably the Yao, who still exported slaves to Arabia. Further military action was required from 1909 to 1912 to suppress the slave trade. However, in 1913, the South African mines stopped the import of labor from north of latitude 22 deg South. Although the Niassa Company quickly took steps to change its customers to the mines of Katanga in Belgian Congo, its South African investors lost interest.

In 1913–14, a German banking consortium bought a majority of the shares of the Niassa Company, aiming to bring about a partition of Portuguese Mozambique between Germany and Great Britain. With the outbreak of the First World War, the British government confiscated the German equities and handed them over to an English financial group led by Owen Philipps, chairman of the Union-Castle Line, which conducted several businesses in Portuguese East Africa, but which found the concession to be more of a liability. During the war, the Niassa Company's territory was the scene of several anti-Portuguese resistance operations by the local chiefs aided by the Germans (including in the Kionga Triangle). To resist this invasion, more than 300 kilometers of roads were opened. This also meant the effective occupation of the Mueda Plateau, which was occupied by the heavily armed Makonde people. The Niassa Company only managed to suppress the Makonde by the early 1920s, and the tribe later became the backbone of the FRELIMO movement in the 1960s and 1970s against continued Portuguese colonial rule.

Although the Niassa Company created administrative structures in the form of districts regulated by agents, the company existed for the benefit of its shareholders, and was not interested in the development of the territory to any other end. Although one of its main obligations was to create light houses along the Mozambican Coast, the Niassa Company fell short of this goal. On 27 October 1929 the Portuguese government refused to grant an extension of the concession, and the Niassa Company was abolished.

== Economics of the Niassa Company ==
The Niassa Company was never able to raise sufficient revenue from its investor to provide for a viable infrastructure to the area under its control. Its initial capitalization of 300,000 pounds was only a fraction of what was required. Contemporary colonial thought held that the key to profitability would be a railroad from Port Amelia to Lake Niassa, which would open the interior of the territory to investments in agriculture and mines. However, the cost of such a railroad would have been over 3 million pounds, which the company could not afford.

For revenue, the company partly relied on the chibalo system, a corvée labor policy, which forced the natives to work on plantations, and public works projects. Rubber and sisal were primary revenue crops. The chibalo system enabled the Niassa Company to establish plantations and to force peasants to work for them and prevent them from growing their own crops for sale.

In addition, the company relied on a hut tax to fund its operations. Although theoretically a tax on each dwelling, in reality the tax was on each adult person, which could be paid in cash or in produce. The hut tax, which was two escudo in 1921 was increased to 50 escudo in 1927 and to 85 escudo in 1929. This was party due to devaluation of the escudo, but was also due to a dwindling tax base, as thousands of Mozambicans sought refuge in Tanganyika or Nyasaland to avoid the tax. As a tax of 50 escudo was the equivalent of three months paid labor, many people fell deeply into debt or forced labor.

The territories total profits amounted to only 115,000 pounds in 1926, which it was able to maintain only by ever more onerous application of hut taxes and the British investors refused to extend more capital unless the concession was extended past 1929, which it was not. At the time the concession ended, the company owed more than million pounds to its creditors as opposed to only 75,000 ads in assets.

== See also ==
- Postage stamps and postal history of the Nyassa Company
- List of Portuguese chartered companies
