= Postage stamps and postal history of Madeira =

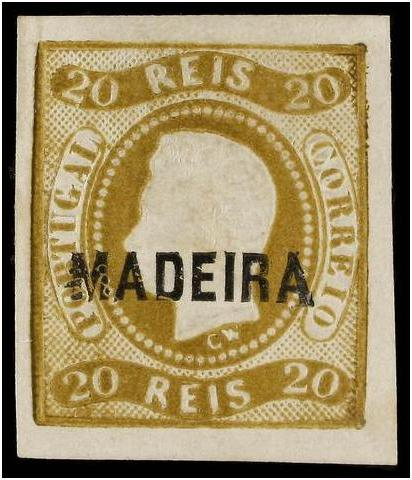
The first stamp of Madeira, overprint on a stamp of Portugal, 1868. 20 reis

On 1 January 1868, Portugal issued postage stamps for the islands of Madeira, consisting of the current stamps of Portugal overprinted "MADEIRA". Subsequent stamps were also overprinted, through 1881.

Unoverprinted Portuguese stamps were used from 1881 to 1892. From 1892 to 1905, while the administrative title of Madeira was changed to the District of Funchal, definitive stamps were issued with the inscription "Funchal".

In 1898 a series of stamps commemorating Vasco da Gama was issued with the inscription "Madeira". Subsequently Madeira used stamps of Portugal from 1905, with two exceptions; the first was the Pombal Issue of postal tax stamps in 1925, and a variant on the Ceres design, issued 1 May 1928. The 21 values of Ceres stamps were obligatory on all mail for eight days – 1 May, 5 June, 1 July, and 31 December 1928, and 1 January, 31 January, 1 May, and 5 June 1929. The funds raised went to help build a museum.

The Ceres stamps were the last to be produced for Madeira until 1980, when Portugal began issuing stamps inscribed "Portugal Madeira" that were valid in both Madeira and continental Portugal, similar to those issued for the Azores.

== Funchal ==
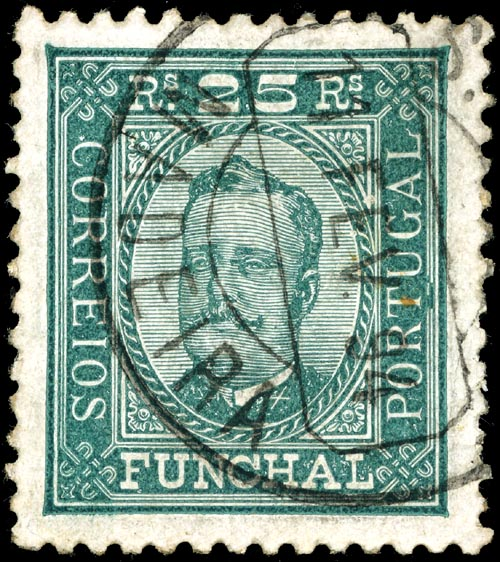
25 reis, 1892, used in 1894; an "S." is visible for the town name, presumably indicating one of Funchal's boroughs.

Postage stamps for Funchal inscribed with the city's name were issued for use in the archipelago of Madeira from 1892 to 1905 by the postal authorities of Portugal. During this time Madeira was administratively referred to as the District of Funchal. From 1868 to 1881 Madeira had used overprinted stamps of Portugal.

Beginning in 1868, postage stamps for Madeira were issued for the postal needs of the island group with its capital Funchal. Unoverprinted Portuguese stamps were used from 1881 to 1892. From 1892 to 1905, while the administrative title of Madeira was changed to the District of Funchal, definitive stamps were issued with the inscription "Funchal". These were valid all over the island. While in 1898 a series of stamps commemorating Vasco da Gama was issued with the inscription "Madeira", unoverprinted stamps of Portugal were used in the archipelago again from 1905.

=== Issues ===
The first series of eight stamps inscribed "Funchal" was produced in 1892. The typographed stamps, engraved by Manuel Diogo Neto, had face values ranging from 5 reis to 80 reis. Four more stamps with higher face values from 100 reis to 300 reis were issued in the following year, as well as a 5 reis stamp. In 1896 the 100 reis stamp was officially bisected in order to frank newspaper wrappers and letters.

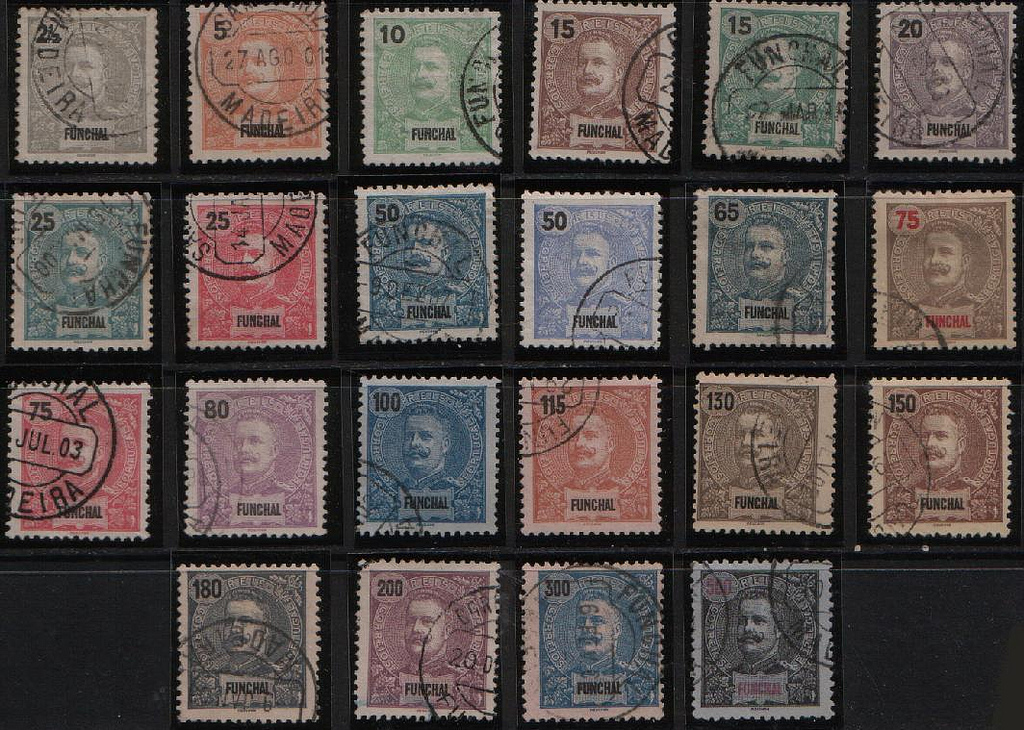
1897 stamps for Funchal

A new series of stamps, engraved by Louis-Eugène Mouchon, was issued in 1897 and supplemented by additional values in 1898, 1899 and 1905. It comprised 19 nominals ranging from 2½ reis to 500 reis. Again, the 100 reis stamp was officially bisected for use on letters. These stamps were of the general single-colour design for Portuguese stamps at the time, but with the name "Funchal" and the value figure printed in black (on two values, in red). The 25 reis value was issued in 1899 in booklets containing six stamps each.

Not counting perforation varieties, bisects, and booklets, 34 different stamps were issued for Funchal, all of them showing the portrait of King Carlos I.

== See also ==
- Postage stamps and postal history of Portugal

== Bibliography ==
- Trincao, Carlos. Die Briefmarken von Madeira. Frankfurt am Main: Arbeitsgemeinschaft Neues Handbuch der Briefmarkenkunde e.V. im Bund Deutscher Philatelisten e.V., 1963 12p.
- Vieira, Armando M. O. Filatelia Da Madeira: Marcas Pré-Adesivas, Selos Postais Adesivos, Inteiros Postais, Marcofilia. Funchal: Filatelia Numismática Madeira, 1999 ISBN 972-731-018-4 116p.
- Rossiter, Stuart & Flower, John (1986). The Stamp Atlas. London: Macdonald. ISBN 0-356-10862-7.
- Machado, Paulo Sá. and Adelino Adrião Melo Caravela. 500 anos dos Correios no Funchal. Funchal: Funchal 500 anos – Uma Porta para o Mundo, 2008 ISBN 978-989-8182-08-1 79 pp.
