= Zambezia Company =

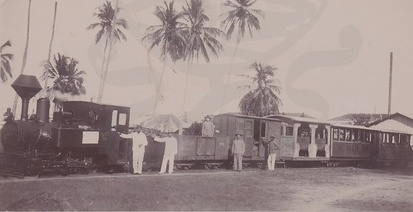
Railroads built by the Zambezia Company at Quelimane

The Zambezia Company (Portuguese: Companhia da Zambézia) was the third leasing company of the Portuguese colony of Mozambique, established on 25 May 1892. Its concession regions covered the areas of Chire, bordering Nyasaland, Zumbo, and Luenha.

== Description ==
The company has its origins in Joaquim Carlos Paiva de Andrada, a Portuguese soldier who received a concession in 1878 to explore the as-of-yet unexplored Zambezia gold mines, as well as the right to explore an area of approx. 100,000 hectares of hinterland in Zambezia. To explore this vast swath of land, the Society of Founders of the Companhia Geral da Zambézia was created in 1879. To avoid the threat of the Mozambique Company taking up its assets, the Zambezia Company was formed with a merger with another British company, the Central Africa and Zouthamberg Exploration Company.

Though the company was primarily dedicated to agriculture, livestock, and salt, there were also company-operated palm, sisal, and maize plantations. It was also the largest company at the time dedicated to transportation, developing navigability on the Zambezi River and constructing a railway that would run from Quelimane to Manquival. The company was a machine for conquering unruly land in the district of Tete and then Quelimane, where they extracted the capitation tax (mussoco) and the workers for agricultural work. With the progress of the “pacification” of the highlands of Quelimane and Angónia, they quickly revealed themselves as reservoirs of labor imported to South Africa and later to São Tomé. The company also received a large number of Indian merchants from Gujarat, multiple of whom were granted contracts for trade monopolies or trade networks.

== See also ==
- Portuguese Mozambique
- Mozambique Company
- Portuguese Empire
- List of Portuguese chartered companies
