= Postage stamps and postal history of Inhambane =

As with several other districts of colonial Mozambique, the Portuguese government printed postage stamps specifically for Inhambane for several years. The first issue was for the 700th anniversary of St. Anthony of Padua in 1895, the stamps being those of Mozambique overprinted "CENTENARIO / DE / S. ANTONIO / Inhambane / MDCCCXCV". This was followed up in 1903 by a regular set featuring a portrait of King Carlos and inscribed "IMHAMBANE". The replacement of the monarchy by a republican regime in Portugal in 1910 resulted in a variety of "REPUBLICA" overprints until 1917. Subsequently, Inhambane reverted to the use of the stamps of Mozambique.

== See also ==
- Postage stamps and postal history of Mozambique

== Bibliography ==
- Cross, John K. "Inhambane." Portuguese Philatelic Society Bulletin. Nos. 105–107. (Nov. 1988-May 1989).
- Rossiter, Stuart & Flower, John (1986). The Stamp Atlas. London: Macdonald. ISBN 0-356-10862-7.
