= Postage stamps and postal history of Guinea-Bissau =

A 2009 miniature sheet of Guinea-Bissau

This is a survey of the postage stamps and postal history of Guinea-Bissau, formerly known as Portuguese Guinea.

== Portuguese Guinea ==
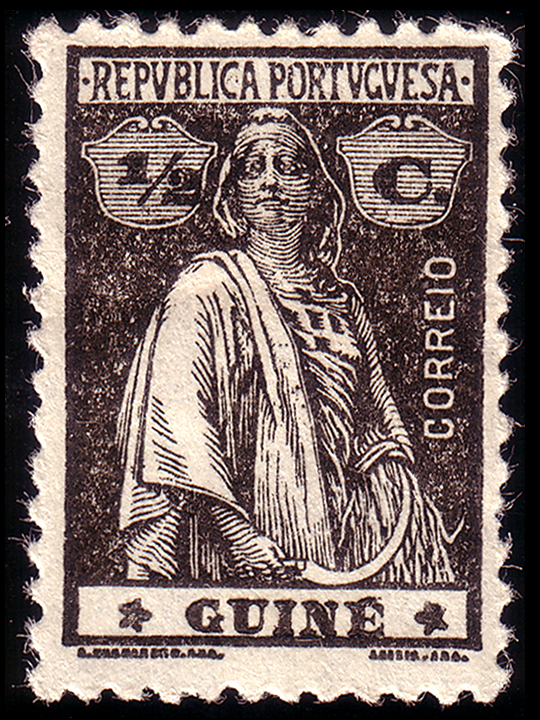
The 1914 Ceres series of Portuguese Guinea

Stamps of Cape Verde were used in what is now Guinea-Bissau from 1877. The first stamps of Portuguese Guinea were issued 1881, overprinting stamps of Cape Verde. The first series of definitives was issued in 1886.

In 1913, the Vasco da Gama commemorative series of Macau, Timor and Portuguese Africa were surcharged in new currency for Portuguese Guinea. The Ceres series was issued in Portuguese Guinea from 1914.

== Independence ==
The first stamps of independent Guinea-Bissau were issued in 1974.
