= Diário da República =

Government gazette of Portugal

- Logo
- Type: Daily official journal
- Publisher: Imprensa Nacional-Casa da Moeda
- Founded: April 10, 1976; 50 years ago
- Language: Portuguese
- Headquarters: Portugal
- ISSN: 0870-9963
- OCLC number: 733141895
- Website: Diário da República
- Free online archives: DIGIGOV

The Diário da República (DR) is the official gazette of Portugal. Between 1869 and 1976, it was called the Diário do Governo.

It is published by the National Printing House and comprises two series. Laws, decree-laws, decisions by the Constitutional Court and other relevant texts are published in the I Series. Regulations, public contracts, etc. are published in the II Series.

As in many countries, legislative texts are only binding after publication (article 119 of the Portuguese Constitution).

Since July 1, 2006, the gazette is published in electronic form, with only a handful of authenticated printed copies (for deposit in the National Archive, the Presidency, the Assembleia da República, the high courts, etc.). There were other changes, such as the end of the III Series. It is possible to buy the printed version of the I Series.

Diário da República Electrónico is the public service of universal and free access. It requires a PDF viewer. Users can search and access entire editions or a particular act, from 1910, in the case of the I Series, or 2000, in the case of the II Series. There are no known plans to backscan older copies.

Added value services are also available, which allow Boolean search, alerts on new legislation regarding subjects defined by the user, etc.

== Other official newspapers in Portugal ==
The Autonomous Regions of Azores and Madeira each have a gazette, the Jornal Oficial da Região Autónoma dos Açores (JORAA) and the Jornal Oficial da Região Autónoma da Madeira (JORAM). These are also available online, but in the case of JORAM only the printed version is considered authentic.

Being a member of the European Union, there is also a Portuguese version of the Official Journal of the European Union.
