= Postage stamps and postal history of Angola =

This is a survey of the postage stamps and postal history of Angola.

== Pre-stamp era ==
A colony of Portugal since the 16th century, Angola was part of the Portuguese mail service.

== First stamps ==
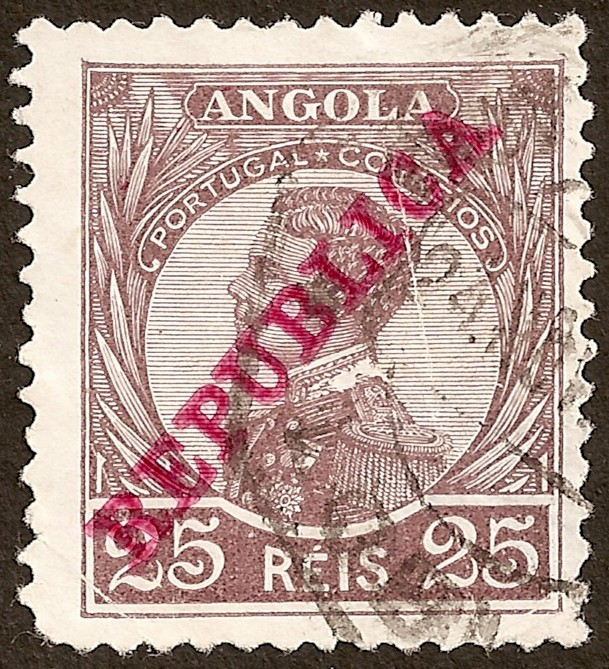
1912 stamp of Angola overprinted "REPUBLICA"

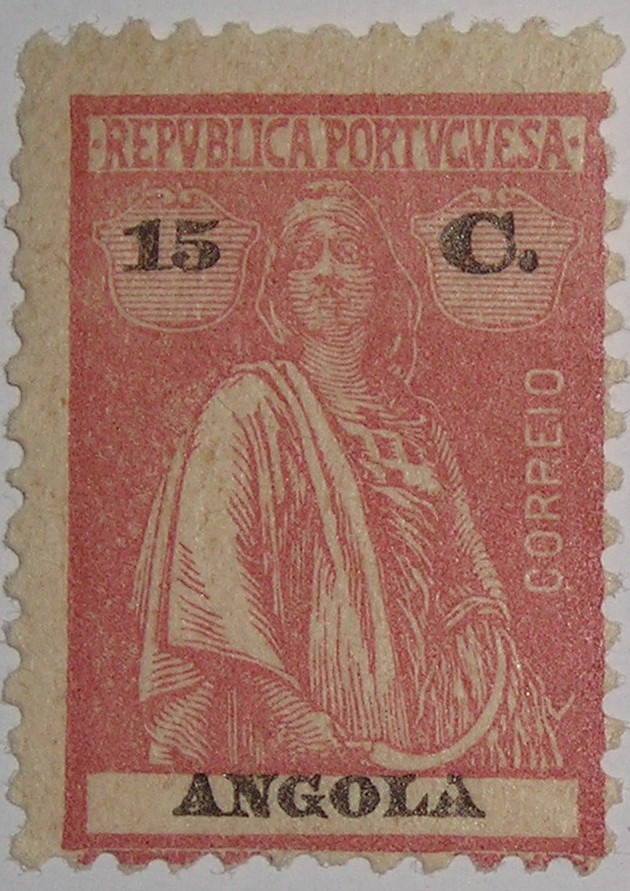
Ceres series of Angola

Its first stamps date from 1870, six values depicting the Portuguese crown in a design common to all the colonies. New values and colors appeared periodically through 1885. In 1886, a series of nine featured an embossed silhouette of Luís I, followed in 1893 and 1898 by depictions of Carlos I.

== Later issues ==
As with the other Portuguese colonies, the 1910s were philatelically complex, with multiple overprints and surcharges applied to the existing stamp stocks. The Ceres series on 1914 outlasted the instability, with new stamps being added as late as 1926, for a total of 40 types.

The first commemorative stamps were a series of three showing a marble column surmounted by the Portuguese arms, marking the visit of President António Óscar Carmona in 1938. A set of 10 in 1948 commemorated the 300th anniversary of the recovery of Angola.

Two definitive series, one in 1951 consisting of 24 designs featuring native birds, and another of 20 stamps in 1953 depicting native animals, are notable as early stamps printed in full color. The 1950s and 1960s saw a number of additional long sets, including coats of arms, portraits of natives, local churches, and so forth.

== Portuguese Congo issues ==
Stamps were issued for the present-day Cabinda Province as Portuguese Congo from 1894 to 1920.

== Independent Angola ==
The first stamp of independent Angola was a 1.50-escudo value issued on 11 November 1975; it depicted a hand holding a rifle aloft, in front of a star. Initially the stamp program was conservative, with 20-30 stamps per year, but starting in the mid-1990s, large numbers of designs began to come out each year, eventually joined by adhesive labels inscribed "Angola" but not authorized by postal authorities and not valid for postage. Angola is a client of the Inter-Governmental Philatelic Corporation.
