= Postage stamps and postal history of Kionga =

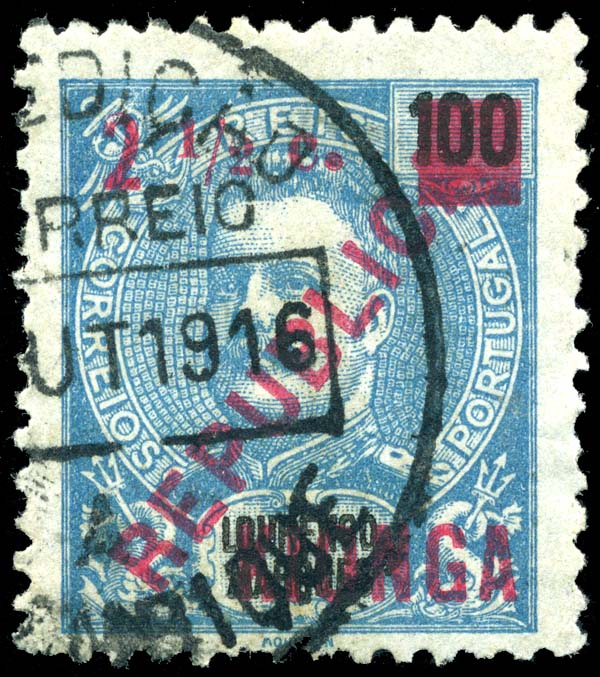
This 2½-centavo stamp, used in August 1916, is an overprint on a Lourenço Marques stamp that was itself overprinted "REPUBLICA" on a King Carlos issue of 1898.

The Kionga Triangle was a tiny territory on the border between German East Africa (present-day United Republic of Tanzania) and the Portuguese colony of Mozambique (present day Republic of Mozambique), originally Portuguese, but occupied by German forces in 1894, and recaptured by the Portuguese forces in 1916. The triangle was the only German territory that the post-war Treaty of Versailles awarded to Portugal.

On May 29, 1916, 100-reis postage stamps from Lourenço Marques were overprinted with "KIONGA" and one of the denominations ½c, 1c, 2½c, and 5c. These were the only stamps issued for Kionga. Most of the stock of the Marques stamps lacked gum, and in 2013, the Scott Catalogue listed the average purchase price of a high-quality set without gum at US$ 97.50. Examples with original gum will command a premium.

== See also ==
- Postage stamps and postal history of Mozambique

== Bibliography ==
- Lamb, Robert E. "Kionga, A Mapmaker's Mistake?" The American Philatelist. Vol. 105 No. 4 (April 1991), p. 327–329.
- Pearson, George R. "The Stamps and Postal History of Kionga (Quionga)." Portuguese Philatelic Society Bulletin. No. 69 (Nov. 1979), p. 5-12.
- Rossiter, Stuart & Flower, John (1986). The Stamp Atlas. London: Macdonald. ISBN 0-356-10862-7.
