= Postage stamps and postal history of Tete =

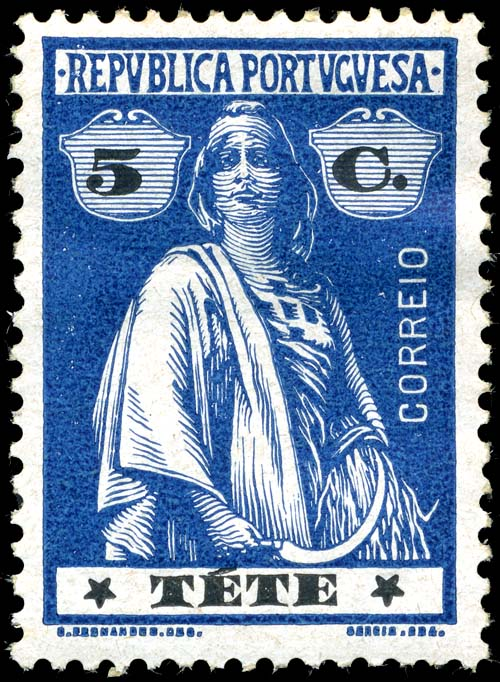
5-centavo value of the Ceres issue, 1914

In 1913 and 1914, Portugal issued postage stamps specifically for Tete Province, now part of Mozambique.

== Background ==
The 1913 stamps were those of the Vasco da Gama issue of 1898, overprinted "REPUBLICA / TETE" and a new denomination in centavos. Each of the eight values from Macau, Portuguese Africa and Timor were overprinted, yielding a total of 24 stamps. In 1914, the omnibus Ceres issue of Portugal included 16 values for Tete, ranging from 1/4 centavo to one escudo. Subsequently, Tete reverted to using the stamps of Mozambique. Although these stamps are not rare, none costing the collector over about US$10, genuinely-used examples are harder to find, and command a premium of about 50-100% over unused.

== See also ==
- Postage stamps and postal history of Mozambique

== Bibliography ==
- Cross, John K. "Quelimane & Tete: Not Quite on the Q. T." Portuguese Philatelic Society Bulletin. Nos. 102–104. (Feb 1987-Aug. 1989).
- Rossiter, Stuart & Flower, John (1986). The Stamp Atlas. London: Macdonald. ISBN 0-356-10862-7.
