= Ulongué =

- Location within Mozambique
- Coordinates: 14°43′S 34°22′E
- Country: Mozambique
- Provinces: Tete Province
- District: Angonia District

Population (2008)
  - Total: 25 309
- Climate: Cwa

Ulongué is a town and the administrative seat of Angónia District, situated in the north east part of the Tete Province in Mozambique. This town is written as Vila Ulongué in some maps, but the name of this town is Ulongué not Vila Ulongué.

The IMAP (teacher's training college), Escola Secundária de Ulongué (secondary school), numerous primary schools, churches, Mozambique Trading Company, Mozambique Leaf Tobacco, and GPZ all have a presence in the area. The town is served by Ulongwe Airport.

== Demographics ==
Year	Population
2008	25,309
2012 (estimated)	27,697
