= Postage stamps and postal history of the Niassa Company =

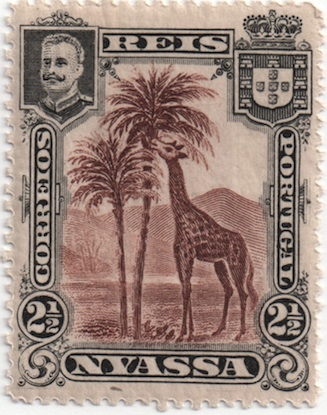
The 2 1/2 real value from the 1901 Nyassa Company stamp issue

This is a survey of the postage stamps and postal history of the Nyassa Company.

The Nyassa Company, in Portuguese the Companhia do Nyassa, and sometimes spelled "Niassa", was a royal company in the Portuguese colony of Mozambique, then known as Portuguese East Africa, that had the concession of the lands that include the present provinces of Cabo Delgado and Niassa between 1891 and 1929. During that time it issued a total of 141 postage stamps, although only a small percentage of these were ever issued for actual postal usage in Nyassa, the remainder being created to take advantage of a buoyant philatelic market for the region's stamps in London.

== Bogus issue ==
The postal history of the Nyassa Company got off to an inauspicious start in 1895 when the governor of the newly created Company left England bound for Nyassa taking with him some 158,000,000 reis-worth of newly printed stamps. The stamps, which featured the Cabo Delgado Tower in Cabo Delgado Province, in the north of the Company's territory, had been printed in England. Under the terms of the Company's mandate from Portugal, however, whilst the Company had the power to issue stamps it was a requirement that those stamps be printed in Portugal. As this stipulation had not been complied with, the Portuguese government declared the issue invalid and required its destruction – all but a small number of the stamps were therefore destroyed.

== 1898 issue ==
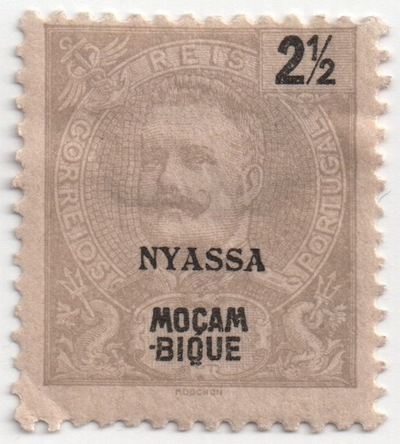
The 2 1/2 real value from the 1898 Nyassa Company stamp issue

The first genuine stamps of the Nyassa Company were two series both issued in Nyassa in 1898.

The first of these series was an earlier Mozambique issue from 1893, featuring a portrait of King Carlos I of Portugal, overprinted with the word "Nyassa".

The second (pictured right) was an overprint of Portugal's standard stamps issued for use in each of its African colonies. These were printed in sheets, and each sheet was then overprinted with the name of the relevant colony – as a result, the stamps were initially overprinted with the word "Mozambique" for use in that colony. When the stamps were then to be used for postage in Nyassa they were subsequently overprinted again, this time with the word "Nyassa", and issued to post offices in Nyassa for use there. They can therefore be distinguished from the other 1898 Nyassa issue by the overprinting of both countries' names.

== 1901 issue ==
It was not until 1901 that the Nyassa Company arranged for the printing and release of Nyassa's own stamps. The stamps were designed by Robert Edgcumbe and printed by Waterlow and Sons in London, and feature 13 stamps of two designs – seven stamps depicting a giraffe browsing a palm tree, an iconic image which is pictured at the top of this page, and six stamps featuring a pair of dromedaries. The stamps (an example of which features in the gallery at the foot of the page) bear the image of King Carlos I in the upper left hand corner, the value of the stamp in reals, and the name of the colony along the bottom of the stamp.

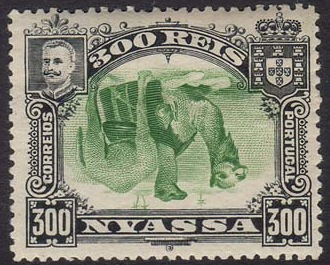
300 Reis invert error

The 10r value from the series is mentioned in the novel Molloy by Samuel Beckett in which the narrator writes:

I put down the tray and looked for a few stamps at random. The Togo one mark carmine with the pretty boat, the Nyassa 1901 ten reis, and several others. I was very fond of the Nyassa. It was green and showed a giraffe grazing at the top of a palm-tree.

In 1903 each of the 13 pictorial denominations of the 1901 issue was printed with the centre inverted. Due to stamp collectors' demand Waterlow and Sons reprinted 20 sheets (1,000 copies) of each error value. Careful study can determine if an error comes from the original 1901 or 1922 printing.

== Surcharges and overprints ==
In 1903 three new values were created by surcharging existing values to take into account standardisation of postage rates across Portugal and its colonies, and two "provisional" stamps were issued by overprinting two existing values in anticipation of a new issue of stamps which was ordered but which never arrived. These surcharges and overprints were initially carried out in Nyassa itself, but subsequently (due to poor quality and lack of stock) also carried out in London – there therefore exist both "local" and "London" types of the surcharges and overprints, with the former being much more scarce and therefore much more valuable.

In 1910 two new values (one of which is shown in the gallery at the foot of this page) were printed by Waterlows which, with the benefit of hindsight, was done not for genuine postal purposes but to take advantage of the buoyant philatelic market for Nyassa Company stamps in London. These values were reprinted in 1922 for the same reason.

== 1911 issue ==
After the assassination of King Carlos I in 1908 his son, Manuel, ascended to the throne for two turbulent years until deposed following the 1910 revolution. Nyassa's stamps were belatedly updated by the creation of an issue in 1911 (pictured in the gallery below) based on a similar layout to the 1901 issue, but featuring two new designs (a zebra and the St. Gabriel, the flagship of Vasco da Gama's fleet), Manuel's portrait in place of that of Carlos I, and overprinted in red with the word "REPUBLICA" to reflect Portugal's new political status.

== Revaluation – the 1918 and 1921 issues ==
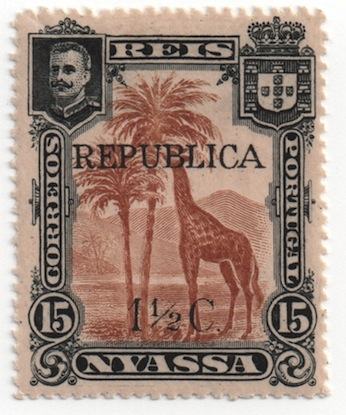
The 1 1/2 reis value from the 1918 Nyassa Company stamp issue

Along with the monarchy, the creation of the First Portuguese Republic also resulted in the abolition of the real as the official currency of Portugal, to be replaced by the escudo and the centavo.

Although introduced in 1911, Nyassa's stamps were not updated until 1918, and when they finally were converted into the new currency for some reason it was the 1901 stamps, featuring King Carlos I, which were updated, and not the later 1911 stamps featuring King Manuel II.

The 1901 stamps (along with the five stamps from 1903 which had already been overprinted once) were therefore overprinted with the word "REPUBLICA", as with the 1911 issue, and their new value in escudos and centavos.

Three years later, in 1921, the 1911 issue was given the same treatment, and the twelve stamps from that issue were overprinted with their new values in escudos and centavos.

== The new 1921 definitives ==
By the time the 1911 issue was revalued and reissued in 1921, the various overprints and surcharges were causing some confusion. In 1921, the whole slate was wiped clean with the issue of a new set of definitive stamps. Comprising twenty stamps in all, the series reused a number of older designs (the giraffe, the zebra and the caravel) from previous issues, along with two new designs (a sailing ship and a portrait of Vasco da Gama).

== Other issues ==
In addition to the various definitive issues, overprints and surcharges the Nyassa Company also issue a set of nine triangular postage due stamps, although these were most likely printed by Waterlows and Sons in its enthusiasm to take advantage of the philatelic market, rather than for any actual need for such stamps in Nyassa itself. The Companhia held philatelic sales close to its heart, as it expected that of its projected income of some £16,000 per annum, £2,000 of this would arise from stamp sales. Also issued were overprints of two postal tax issues previously released in Portugal, then overprinted and released in Mozambique, and finally further overprinted and released in Nyassa.

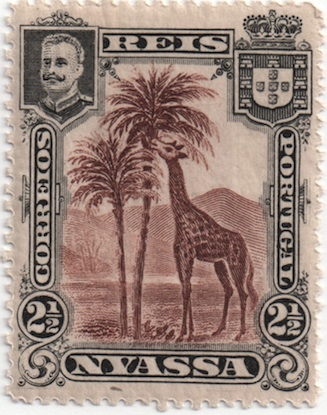
The 2½ reis value from the 1901 Nyassa Company stamp issue

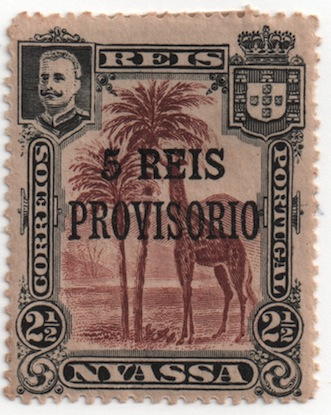
The 5 reis value from the 1910 Nyassa Company stamp issue

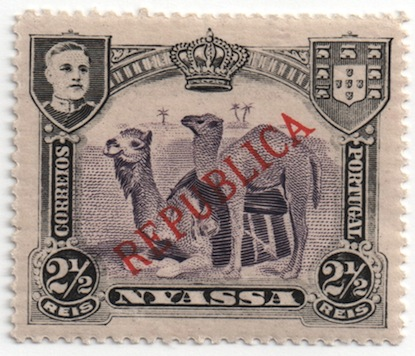
The 2½ reis value from the 1911 Nyassa Company stamp issue

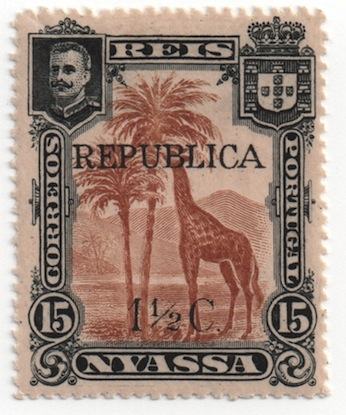
The 1½ centavos value from the 1918 Nyassa Company stamp issue

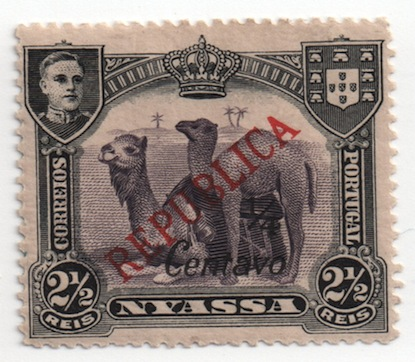
The ¼ centavo value from the 1921 Nyassa Company stamp issue

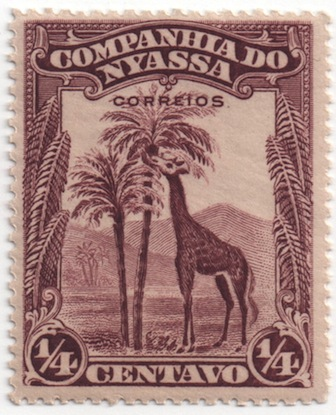
The ¼ centavo value from the 1921 Nyassa Company definitive issue

== See also ==
- Postage stamps and postal history of Mozambique
