= Ulongwe Airport =

- IATA: none; ICAO: FQUG

Summary
- Airport type: Civil
- Serves: Ulongwe
- Elevation AMSL: 4,265 ft / 1,300 m
- Coordinates: 14°42′17″S 34°21′09″E

Map
- Location in Mozambique

Runways
Direction	Length		Surface
Direction	ft	m	Surface
16/34	5,900	1,798	Asphalt
- Sources: World Aero Data

Ulongwe Airport (ICAO: FQUG) is an airport serving Ulongwe, Mozambique.

== See also ==
- List of airports in Mozambique
