= Isabel Camarinha =

Portuguese trade union leader, former secretary-general of the CGTP-IN

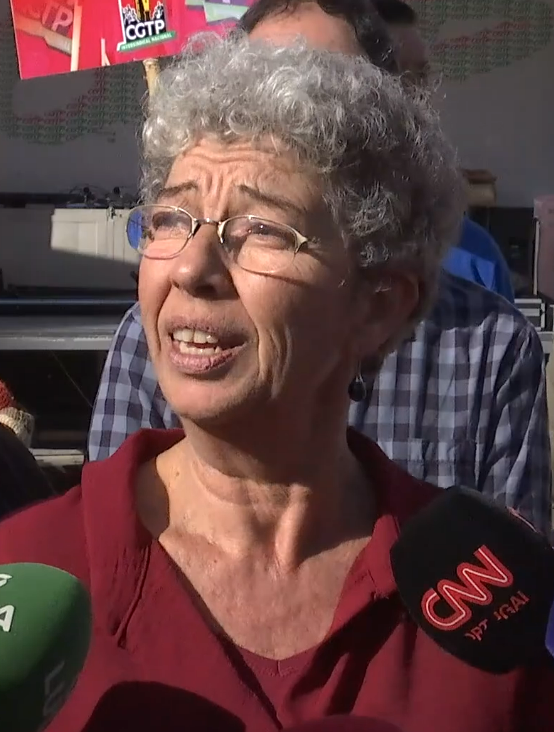
- Born: Isabel Maria Robert Lopes Perdigão Camarinha; 7 June 1960 (age 65); Moscavide, Loures, Portugal
- Occupation: Trade unionist
- Years active: 1991–present
- Organization: Confederação Geral dos Trabalhadores Portugueses (CGTP-IN)
- Known for: Secretary-general of the CGTP-IN (2020–2024)

Isabel Maria Robert Lopes Perdigão Camarinha (born 7 June 1960) is a Portuguese trade unionist who served as secretary‑general of the General Confederation of the Portuguese Workers (Confederação Geral dos Trabalhadores Portugueses – Intersindical Nacional, CGTP‑IN), the largest trade union confederation in Portugal, from February 2020 to February 2024.

== Early life and education ==
Camarinha was born in the Lisbon metropolitan area, in the parish of Moscavide, municipality of Loures, on 7 June 1960. She trained in law and became active in the labor movement as a young woman, later joining the staff of the Lisbon commerce, office and services union (later CESP/CGTP‑IN), where she worked as a union official.

== Trade union career ==
Camarinha has been a trade union leader since 1991, first in the structures of the Sindicato dos Trabalhadores do Comércio, Escritórios e Serviços de Lisboa, and later in the national leadership of CESP, where she held coordinating responsibilities. Within CGTP‑IN she integrated national bodies and represented the confederation in social concertation forums, participating in negotiations on labour legislation, the minimum wage and social protection.

In February 2020, at the XIV Congress of CGTP‑IN, she was elected secretary‑general, succeeding Arménio Carlos and becoming the first woman to lead the confederation in its history. Her mandate was marked by the COVID-19 pandemic, during which she coordinated union responses on job protection, income guarantees and workplace health measures, and by a subsequent period of high inflation and cost‑of‑living crisis that prompted extensive strike waves and a National Day of Struggle in June 2023.

== Secretary‑general of CGTP‑IN ==
As secretary‑general, Camarinha emphasized combating precarious work, low wages and the erosion of collective bargaining, calling for a significant rise in the national minimum wage, stronger public services and the reversal of restrictive labor law reforms. She criticized the government's "Agenda do Trabalho Digno" (agenda of the dignified work) as insufficient to resolve structural problems created by earlier labor code changes and defended the need to "break with decades of right‑wing policies" and "end exploitation", in line with CGTP‑IN's class‑based union orientation.

Under her leadership, CGTP‑IN reported more than 110,000 new union memberships in four years, which she presented as evidence of renewed worker mobilization and organisational strengthening. She also coordinated numerous strikes and demonstrations across mainland Portugal, the Azores and Madeira, insisting that there would be no day in May without workers in struggle.

Camarinha's term ended at the XV Congress of CGTP‑IN, held in Seixal in February 2024, when she stepped down due to the age limits applicable to the post. She was succeeded as secretary‑general by Tiago Oliveira, a mechanic and trade union leader from the União de Sindicatos do Porto. After leaving the CGTP‑IN leadership, Camarinha returned to the staff of CESP/CGTP‑IN, resuming union work in the commerce, offices and services sector.

== Political and ideological stance ==
Camarinha is associated with the class struggle, anti‑neoliberal line historically defended by CGTP‑IN and closely aligned with the positions of the Portuguese Communist Party, although she is primarily known as a union rather than party figure. She has consistently argued for higher wages, price controls on essential goods, stronger social benefits, progressive taxation of large profits and the defence of national sovereignty within the European Union.
