= Postage stamps and postal history of Portugal =

History of postage in Portugal

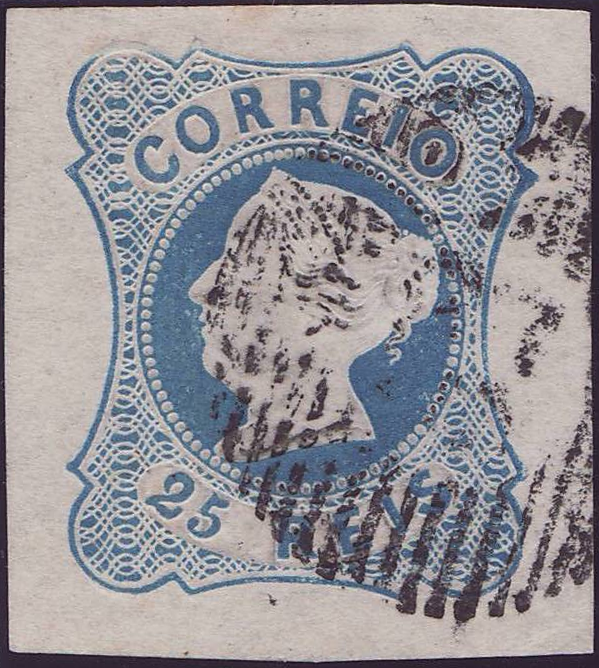
An early stamp of Portugal

The early issues from 1853 had the monarch's head, white and featureless, embossed on a coloured background. The most valuable stamps from this period are Gibbons catalogue nos 8 and 9 from the 1853 issue: the 100 reis lilacs.

The first pictorial issue in 1894 commemorated the 500th anniversary of Henry the Navigator's birth. Vasco da Gama's voyage to India in 1497-1498 was the subject of an 1898 issue. The Vasco da Gama designs were also used in the African colonies and were inscribed Africa instead of Portugal. This was the only general issue for colonies.

The 1910 King Manoel II definitives were overprinted "REPUBLICA" after the revolution and the first republican issue was the familiar Ceres type of 1912.

Aeroplanes were first depicted in 1923 following the Gago Coutinho–Sacadura Cabral flight from Portugal to Brazil in 1922. In 1924, the first literary issue commemorated the birth of epic poet Luís de Camões in 1524.

The common Caravel type first appeared in 1943, the Medieval Knight in 1953 and Portugal's first railway stamp in 1956.

The volume of stamp issues increased from the 1960s. The currency on Portuguese stamps changed from escudos to euros at the start of 2002.

1898 Vasco da Gama issue
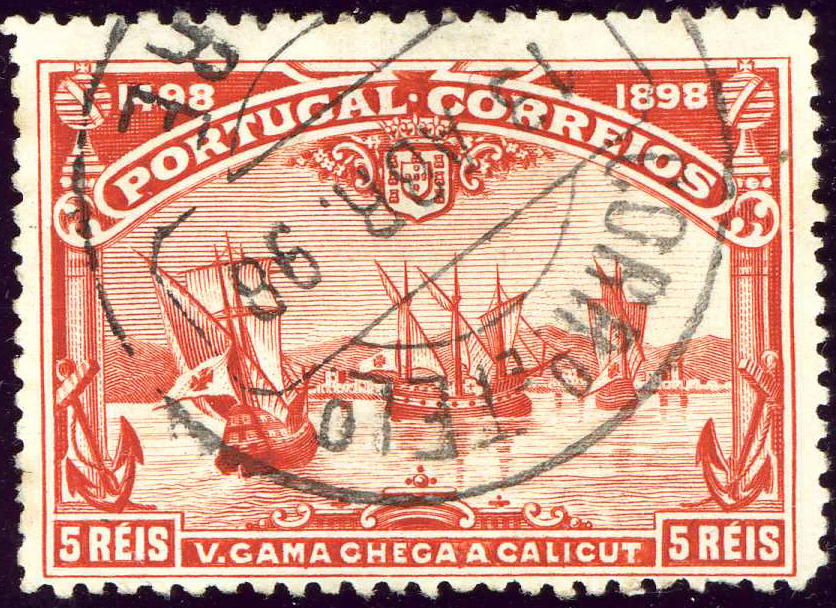

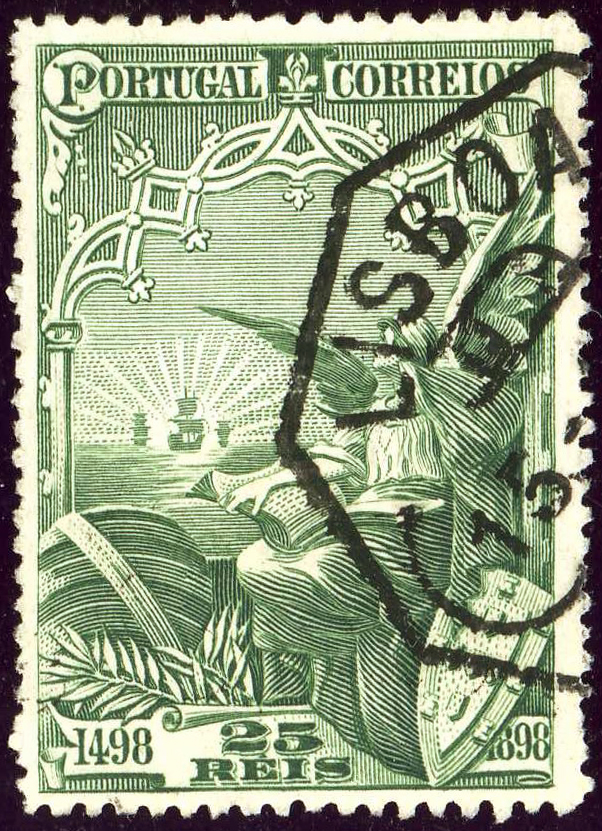

== See also ==
- Postage stamps and postal history of the Azores
- Postage stamps and postal history of Madeira

== Sources ==
- Stanley Gibbons Ltd: various catalogues
- Encyclopaedia of Postal Authorities
- Rossiter, Stuart & John Flower. The Stamp Atlas. London: Macdonald, 1986. ISBN 0-356-10862-7
