= Ceres series (Portugal) =

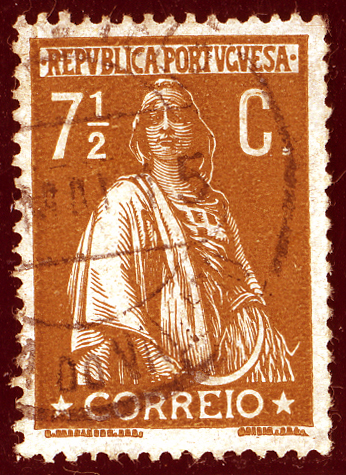
1912 Ceres stamp of Portugal.

The Ceres series of Portuguese postage stamps is a definitive series depicting the Roman goddess Ceres that was issued between 1912 and 1945 in Portugal and its colonies.

== History and description ==
The Ceres stamps were the first issued after the proclamation of the Portuguese Republic, superseding stamps figuring king Manuel II that had been overprinted with the word "República" 1910–1911.

Drawn by Constantino de Sobral Fernandes and engraved by José Sérgio de Carvalho e Silva, the design represents the goddess Ceres, standing and looking forward, holding a billhook in one hand and a sheaf of grain in the other. The inscriptions are "REPUBLICA PORTUGUESA" and "CORREIO" (for Portuguese Republic and Post). It was printed in typography by the Portuguese mint, Casa da Moeda.

The series were issued between February 16, 1912, and 1931. During their period of issue, they went through several changes:

- 1928–1929 – overprint with new denominations
- 1929 – overprint "Revalidado"
- 1930 – re-engraving by Arnoldo Fragoso

The 1926 series was printed in lithography, engraved by Eufénio Carlo Alberto Merondi and printed by the British firm De La Rue. The author's names are not printed on this series.

The Ceres stamps were declared obsolete September 30, 1945, having been superseded in 1943 by the Caravel series of definitives.

== In the colonies ==
Ceres stamps were issued in the Portuguese colonies as well, in a key plate design with the denominations and name of the colony printed in black.

However, in the Azores, the Ceres stamps in use were Portuguese ones overprinted with the archipelago's name. In 1928, Madeira received intaglio printed stamps with typographic denominations; they were made by Perkins Bacon in London.

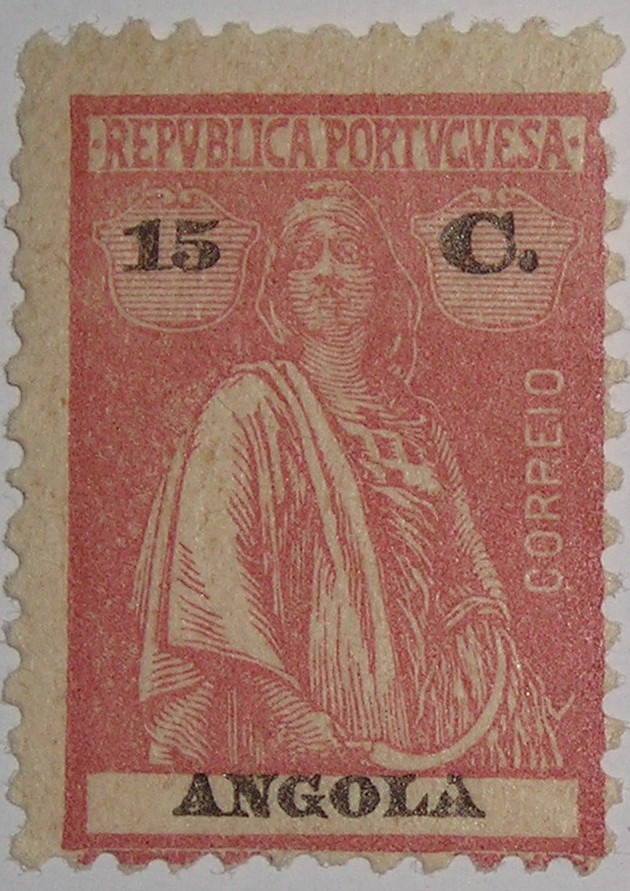
Angola

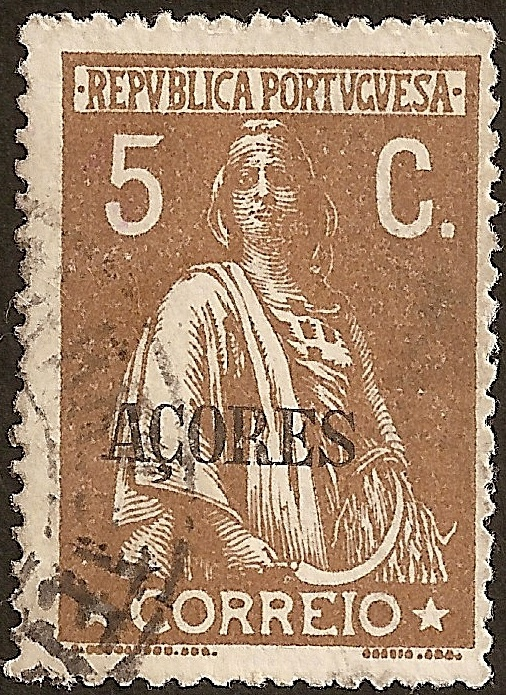
Azores

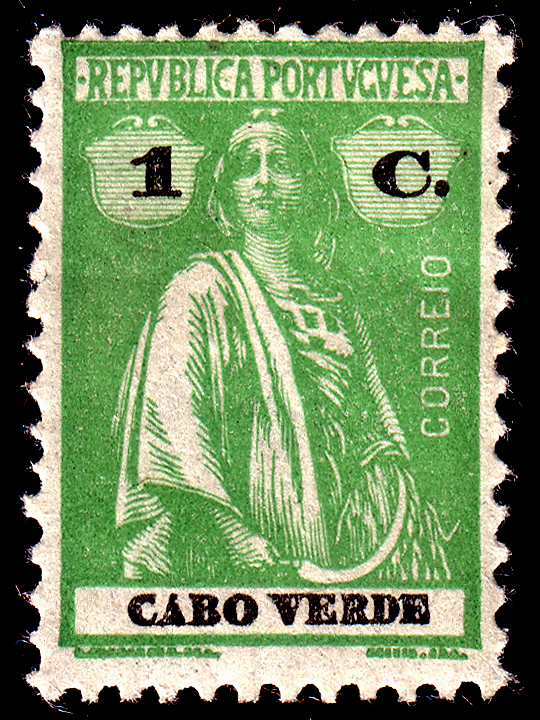
Cape Verde

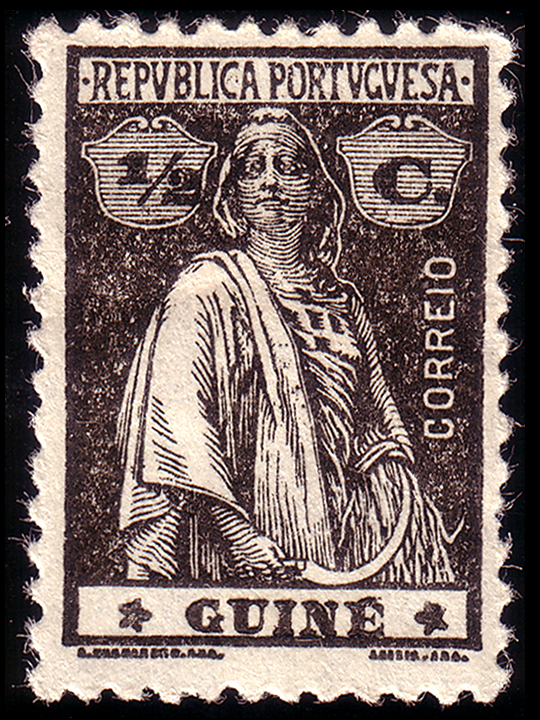
Portuguese Guinea

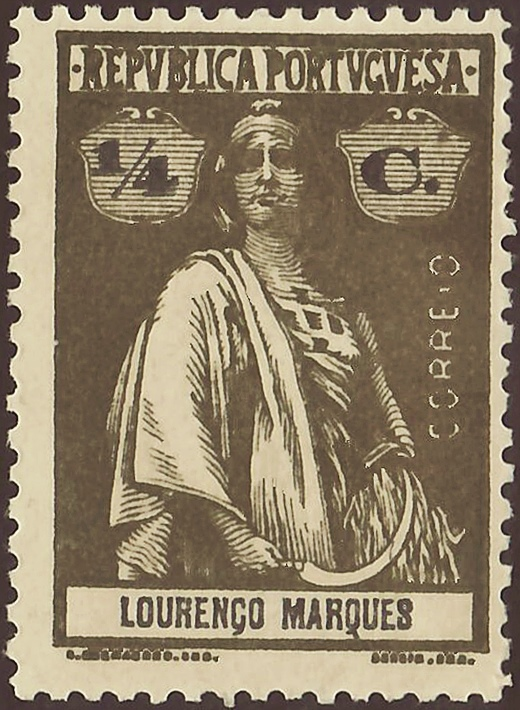
Lourenço Marques

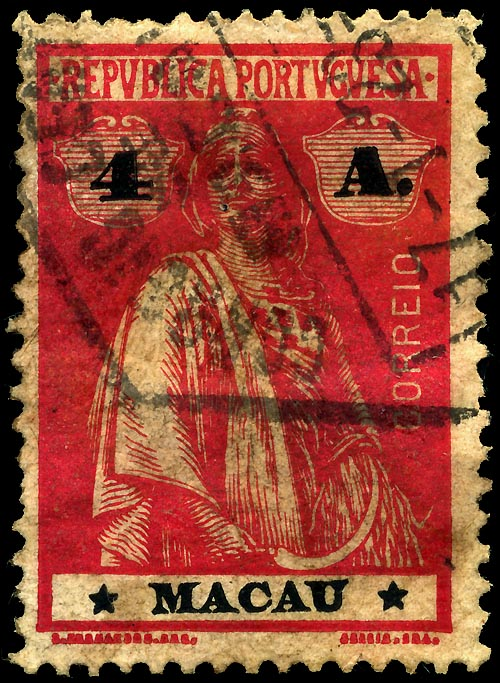
Macau

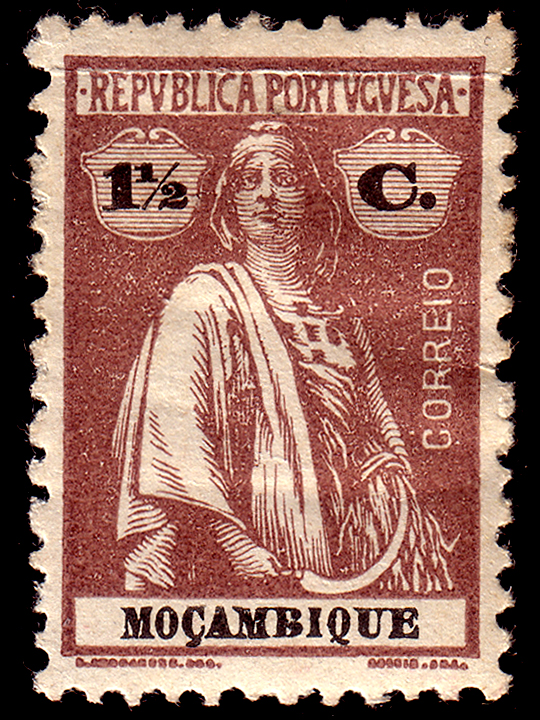
Mozambique

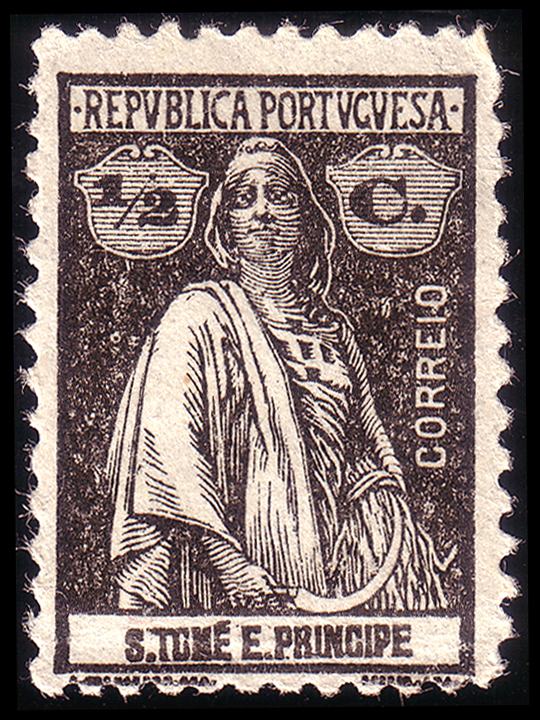
São Tomé and Príncipe

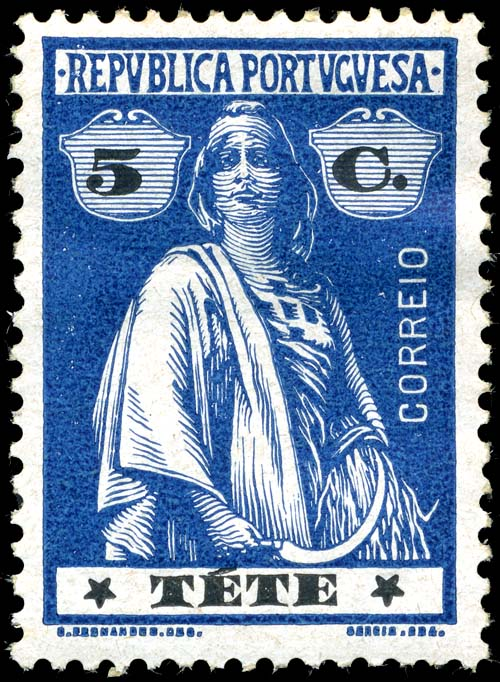
Tete

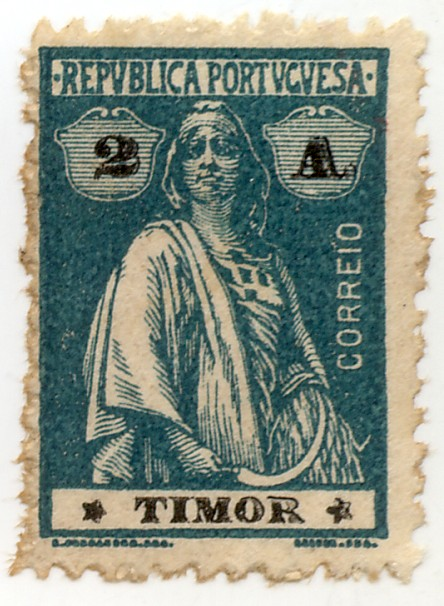
Portuguese Timor

== See also ==
- Postage stamps and postal history of Portugal
