= Mozambique Company =

Royal company in the Portuguese colony of Mozambique

- Coat of Arms of Portuguese Mozambique
- Native name: Companhia de Moçambique
- Industry: International trade
- Founded: 11 February 1891
- Defunct: 1972
- Fate: Dissolved
- Headquarters: Beira, Portuguese Mozambique, Portuguese Empire
- Area served: Portuguese Empire
- Key people: Manuel Rafael Gorjão Henriques

The Mozambique Company (Portuguese: Companhia de Moçambique) was a royal company operating in Portuguese Mozambique that had the concession of the lands in the Portuguese colony, corresponding to the present provinces of Manica and Sofala in central Mozambique.

The company was established on February 11, 1891, with a capital stock of about 5 million dollars obtained from financiers from Germany, the United Kingdom and South Africa. Isaacman and Isaacman report that the firm was capitalized at 40,000 pounds (18.14 ton), and that British and French capital quickly predominated.

The concession was granted for a period of 50 years, during which the company could not only exploit the resources and existing manpower (partly through the chibalo system of forced labor) but also grant sub-concessions. The company was granted the exclusive right to collect taxes, but was itself granted a 25-year tax exemption. In return, the Portuguese state would receive 7.5% of the company's profits and 10% of the sold shares. The company was also required to settle 1,000 Portuguese families and provide education and public administration in its territory.

In practice, the company made only partial use of the prerogatives with which it had been bestowed, but this was balanced by the fact that it also met very few of its obligations. Having only limited capital, the company did little to develop the area, deriving most of its income from its ability to tax and its power to use conscripted labor on its plantations and for lease to adjacent estates. Resistance to the forced labor regime was a major cause of rebellions against the company, which occurred in 1902 and 1917. Despite the company's obligation under its charter to provide forces to maintain law and order, it was unable to meet these crises, and on both occasions, Portugal had to mount expensive interventions.

The Mozambique Company had its headquarters in Beira, where it controlled the public administration and the post offices. The company also founded a private bank, the Banco da Beira, which issued currency in pounds.

Because of its bad performance and because of the shift, under the Salazar regime, towards Portuguese control and away from international control of the economy, the company's concession was not renewed when it ran out in 1942. The Governor of Manica and Sofala commented:

They did nothing to develop the potential wealth of this entire region, preferring to plunder it and alienate the natives.

On 18 July 1942, the territory of Manica and Sofala passed to the Portuguese colonial authorities and the Mozambique Company continued to operate in the agricultural and commercial sectors.

On October 20, 1961, The Mozambique Company became the Grupo Entreposto Comercial de Moçambique, which transformed itself into a holding on September 6, 1972, with the participation of capital from other companies, including Entreposto-Gestão e Participações (SGPS) SA.

In 1939, the President of Portugal awarded the Grand Cross of the Order of the Colonial Empire to the company, the first time it had been awarded to a company.

== See also ==
- Niassa Company — a similar company which operated in northern Mozambique
- Company of Guinea
- Portuguese Empire
- List of Portuguese chartered companies
