= Kionga Triangle =

German colony in modern Mozambique

Coordinates: 10°35′46″S 40°30′31″E

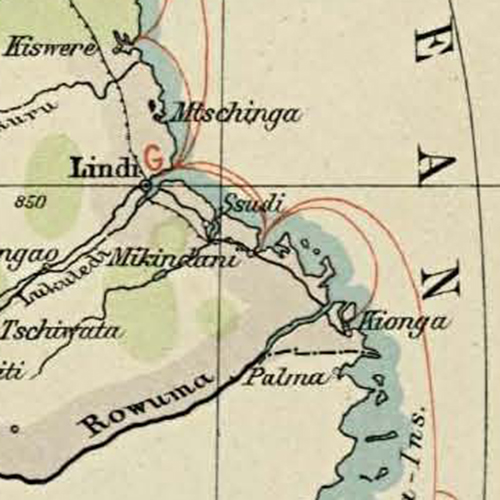
The Kionga Triangle, shown on a contemporary German map

The Kionga Triangle (German: Kionga-Dreieck, Portuguese: Triângulo de Quionga) was a small region of German East Africa situated at the mouth of the Ruvuma River. The Ruvuma served as the border between the German colony and Portuguese Mozambique, and the Kionga Triangle was the only section of German East Africa south of the river. Its principal settlement was Kionga (now Quionga) which had a population of 4,000 in 1910. It became a German possession in 1894 but came under Portuguese control in April 1916 during World War I. The post-war Treaty of Versailles reaffirmed that the river was the border between Tanganyika, then under British control, and Portuguese Mozambique. The triangle was the only territory that the treaty awarded to Portugal.

Today, the former Kionga Triangle forms part of Cabo Delgado Province in Mozambique.

== See also ==
- Postage stamps and postal history of Kionga
