= Angónia District =

Coordinates: 14.717°S 34.367°E

Angónia
- District
- Angónia District on the map of Mozambique
- Country: Mozambique
- Province: Tete
- Capital: Ulongué

Area
  - Total: 3,277 km^{2} (1,265 sq mi)

Population (2007 census)
  - Total: 335,808
  - Density: 102.5/km^{2} (265.4/sq mi)

Angónia District is a district in the northern part of Tete Province in the central region of Mozambique. Its administrative center is the town of Ulongué. The district is located in the northwest of the province, and borders with Dedza District of Malawi in the north, Ntcheu District of Malawi in the east, Tsangano District in the south, and with Macanga District in the west. The area of the district is 3,277 square kilometres (1,265 mi^{2}). It has a population of 335,808 as of 2007.

== Geography ==
The district is mountainous; the principal mountains are Monte Dómuè (2,095 metres (6,873 ft)), Macungua (1,797 metres (5,896 ft)), and Chirobwé (2,021 metres (6,631 ft)).

According to the Köppen climate classification, the climate of the district is tropical humid (BSw), with large variations with altitude. The average rainfall in the district varies between 725 millimetres (28.5 in) and 1,149 millimetres (45.2 in).

== History ==
The name means "Angoni land". Angoni is the plural of Ngoni/Nguni, migrant peoples from South Africa after the disintegration of Zulu Empire in the nineteenth century. The language spoken in the district is Chichewa, though others would call it Chingoni. Chichewa seems more probable because when Nguni arrived in the region there already were people there called Achewa. As warriors, the Nguni mostly killed Achewa males and married Achewa women. Their children spent most of their time with their mothers and ended up learning their mothers' language (Chichewa) and not the language of their fathers, as the fathers were away hunting or fighting.

== Demographics ==
As of 2005, 47% of the population of the district was younger than 15 years. 11% of the population spoke Portuguese. 81% were analphabetic, mostly women.

== Administrative divisions ==
The district is divided into two postos, Ulongué (six localities) and Dómuè (eleven localities).

== Economy ==
1% of the households in the district have access to electricity.

=== Agriculture ===
In the district, there are 65,000 farms which have on average 1.5 hectares (0.0058 mi^{2}) of land. The main agricultural products are corn, cassava, cowpea, peanut, sweet potato, and tobacco.

Angónia is a plateau and relatively rich in agricultural and animal resources with very arable soils. After independence in 1975, Angónia was considered one of the granaries of Mozambique because of its production of maize and potatoes, a prestige which ended with the civil war. The climate is cool in winter and warm/mild in summer.

=== Transportation ===
There is a road network in the district which is 277 kilometres (172 mi) long and includes a 18 kilometres (11 mi) stretch of the national road EN223.

== Education ==
Angonia has one of Mozambique's highest number of schools with three secondary schools and one high school (11 and 12 year). It also has one teachers' training college, the Instituto de Magistério Primário de Angónia (IMAP). And recently a CCAP church introduced a Bachelor of Theology course at their Instituto Cristão de Moçambique-College.
