= History of Lae =

As the township of Lae, in Morobe Province, Papua New Guinea is a relatively new entity, the history of the Lae environs is much older.

== Archaeology ==
Humans have been in New Guinea for as long as 60,000 years, according to archaeological evidence, although this is under debate.

Recent archaeological research suggests that 50,000 years ago, people may have occupied sites in the highlands at altitudes of up to 2,000 metres, rather than being restricted to warmer coastal areas.

== European contact ==
In 1793, Antoine Bruni d'Entrecasteaux sailed up the "tail" of New Guinea into the Gulf he named Houn de Kermadec.

In 1856, Italian Catholic priests arrived at Mandok Island, Siassi before being forced to leave by disease.

Between 1871 and 1880, Russian anthropologist Nicholai Miklukho-Maklai made a number of expeditions to New Guinea, spending several years living among native tribes, and described their way of life in a comprehensive treatise.

In 1874, John Moresby on HMS Basilisk sails along Huon Gulf and names Parsee Point (Salamaua), the Markham, Rawlinson Ranges, and explores around the Markham mouth.

The history of Lae township, according to Lucas (1972) can be classified into four periods; the mission phase (1886–1920), the gold phase (1926 until World War II), the timber and agricultural phase (until 1965) and the industrial boom from 1965 with the opening of the Highlands Highway.

== 1800s ==
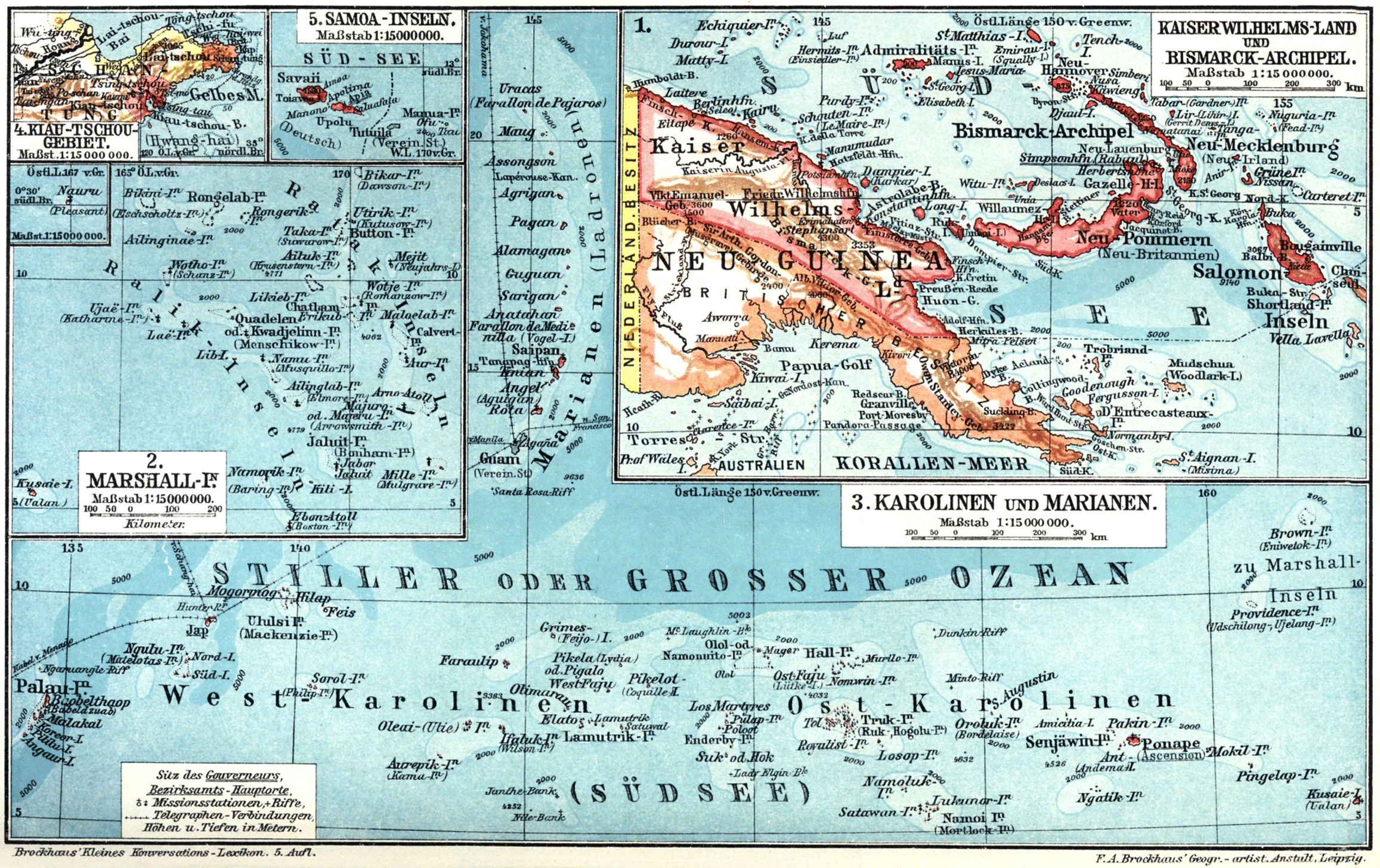
Map of the Kaiserwilhelmsland, the German colony of New Guinea, 1884–1919

=== German traders ===
The first Germans were probably from the Dutch East India Company: during Abel Tasman's first voyage.

Until the 1871 unification, Germany had not concentrated on the development of a navy, and this essentially had precluded German participation in earlier imperialist scrambles for remote colonial territory – the so-called "place in the sun". (Note: in this effort and conjointly with his firm rejection of taking over the French colonial possessions after the Franco-Prussian war, Bismarck in February 1871 characterised a German acquisition of colonies as equivalent to the Polish nobility wearing silks and furs when they needed shirts)

Many Germans in the late 19th century viewed colonial acquisitions as a true indication of having achieved nationhood. Public opinion eventually arrived at an understanding that prestigious African and Pacific colonies went hand-in-hand with dreams of a High Seas Fleet. Both aspirations would become reality, nurtured by a press replete with Kolonialfreunde [supporters of colonial acquisitions] and by a myriad of geographical associations and colonial societies. Bismarck and many deputies in the Reichstag had no interest in colonial conquests merely to acquire square miles of territory. (Note: Reichstag deputy Friedrich Kapp stated in debate in 1878 that whenever there is talk of "colonization", he would recommend to keep pocketbooks out of sight, "even if the proposal is for the acquisition of paradise.")

In the late 1870s and early 1880s, an active minority in Germany consisting of Kolonialverein of 1882 and the Society for German Colonization (Gesellschaft für Deutsche Kolonisation) tried to persuade Chancellor Bismarck to embark on a colonial policy with no success.

Eventually Bismarck organised the acquisition of much of what would become the German colonial empire.

On 23 June 1884, Bismarck told the Reichstag that annexations would now proceed but by grants of charters to private companies. (Note: citing R. M. Smith (tr.) (1885) German Interests in the South Sea, abstracts of the White Book presented to the Reichstag, December 1884 and February 1885 and pinpoint reference 1884)

Hanseatic League merchant houses were the first to establish footholds: Johann Cesar Godeffroy & Sohn of Hamburg, headquartered at Samoa from 1857, operated a South Seas network of trading stations especially dominating the copra trade and carrying German immigrants to various South Pacific settlements with Godeffroy and Son estimated to control as much as 70 per cent of the commerce of the South Seas. (Note: citing H. U. Wehler Bismarck und der Imperialismus (1969) pp 208–15; E. Suchan-Galow Die deutsche Wirtschaftsta"tigkeit in der Südsee vor der ersten Besitzergreifung (1884) (Vero"ffentlichung des Vereins für Hamburgische Geschichte, Bd. XIV, Hamburg, 1940)

Hernsheim and Robertson, established a German community on Matupi Island, in Blanche Bay (the north-east coast of New Britain) from which it traded in New Britain, the Caroline, and the Marshall Islands.

Postcards depicted romanticised images of natives and exotic locales, such as this early 20th century card of the German colonial territory in New Guinea.

The German effort included the first commercial endeavours in the 1850s and 1860s in West Africa, East Africa, the Samoan Islands and the unexplored north-east quarter of New Guinea with adjacent islands later Kaiser-Wilhelmsland and the Bismarck Archipelago. German traders and merchants began to establish themselves in the African Cameroon delta and the mainland coast across from Zanzibar. The West and East Africa firms at Apia and the settlements of Finschhafen, Simpsonhafen and the islands Neu-Pommern and Neu-Mecklenburg, trading companies newly fortified with credit began expansion into coastal landholding. (Note: p. 106)

As Bismarck was converted to the colonial idea by 1884, he favoured "chartered company" land management rather than a colonial government setup due to financial considerations. He reluctantly acquiesced to pleas for help to deal with revolts and armed hostilities by often powerful rulers whose lucrative slavery activities seemed at risk. German native military forces initially engaged in dozens of punitive expeditions to apprehend and punish freedom fighters, at times with British assistance.

By the end of 1875, one German trader reported: "German trade and German ships are encountered everywhere, almost at the exclusion of any other nation". (Note: p 26 quoting Schleinitz to Admiralty, 28 December 1875, Drucksache zu den Verhandlungen des Bundesrath, 1879, vol. 1, Denkschrift, xxiv–xxvii, p. 3.)

=== German New Guinea Company ===
Flag of the German New Guinea Company (1885–1899).

The German New Guinea Company (German: Deutsche Neuguinea-Kompagnie) was founded in 1884 at Berlin by Adolph von Hansemann and a syndicate of German bankers for the purpose of colonising and exploiting resources on Neu Guinea (German New Guinea), where German interest grew after British Queensland's annexation of part of eastern New Guinea.

Between 1879–1882, ornithologist and explorer Dr Otto Finsch was secretly tasked by German Chancellor Count Otto von Bismarck to expeditiously select land for plantation development on the north-east coast of New Guinea and establish trading posts. On his return to Germany, Otto Finsch joined a small, informal group interested in German colonial expansion into the South Seas led by the banker, Adolph von Hansemann. Finsch encouraged them to pursue the founding of a colony on the north-east coast of New Guinea and the New Britain Archipelago even providing them with an estimate of the costs of such a venture.

While the western half of New Guinea had been administered by the Netherlands since 1828, the eastern half was not annexed by any European power until the 1880s. In 1883, fearful of growing foreign influence, particularly the influence of Germany, the British colony of Queensland annexed the south-eastern part of New Guinea, against the wishes of the British government.

This initiated German interest in the remaining third of the island and on 3 November 1884, under the auspices of the Deutsche Neuguinea-Compagnie (New Guinea Company), the German flag was flown over Kaiser-Wilhelmsland, the Bismarck Archipelago and the German Solomon Islands.

On 17 May 1885, the German Emperor granted an Imperial charter to the newly founded Neuguinea-Kompanie (New Guinea Company) for this annexation, which was further extended to the Solomon Islands on 13 November 1886.

For the first fifteen years the colony was administered under imperial charters by a private company, in the manner of the old British and Dutch East India Company, but with far less success. When the Imperial Government took over the running of the colony in 1899, its overriding objective was rapid economic development, based on a German-controlled plantation economy.

To expand the highly profitable plantations, the Germans needed more native workers. The government sent military expeditions to take direct control of more areas 1899 to 1914. The government enforced new laws that required the tribes to furnish four weeks of labour per person annually and payment of a poll tax in cash, thereby forcing reluctant natives into the work force. The planters protested and the government responded by sending troops.

=== Kaiser-Wilhelmsland ===
The German Colonial Empire, showing German New Guinea in brown

German New Guinea (German: Deutsch-Neuguinea) was the first part of the German colonial empire. The mainland portion, Kaiser-Wilhelmsland, was formed from the northeastern part of New Guinea. The islands to the east of Kaiser-Wilhelmsland, on annexation, were renamed the Bismarck Archipelago (formerly the New Britannia Archipelago) and the two largest islands renamed Neu-Pommern ("New Pomerania", today's New Britain) and Neu-Mecklenburg ("New Mecklenburg, now New Ireland).

The economic life of German New Guinea's small population of European and Asian settlers, as well as that of its Melanesian population, relied heavily on the export of copra and the import of goods and services.

=== Lutheran and Catholic missionaries ===
By the mid-1880s, German church authorities had devised a definite program for missionary work in New Guinea and assigned it to the Rhenish Mission, under the direction of Friedrich Fabri (1824–91), a Lutheran. The missionaries faced extraordinary difficulties: repeated sickness from the unhealthy climate; psychological and sometimes violent tensions and fights between the colonial administration and the natives. The natives rejected European customs and norms of social behaviour; few embraced Christianity. In 1921, the Rhenish Mission territory was handed over to the United Evangelical Lutheran Church of Australia.

The mission society provided clergy and religious education for Lutheran settlements in Missouri, Iowa and Ohio, Australia, and anywhere else "free thinking" Lutherans had settled.

On 12 July 1886, a German missionary, Johann Flierl, a pioneer missionary for the Southern Australian Lutheran Synod and the Neuendettelsau Mission Society, sailed to Simbang in Finschhafen, Kaiser-Wilhelmsland and arrived at Lae shortly after.

Flierl sailed from the Cooper Creek mission in South Australia towards German New Guinea stopping at Queensland to establish the Cape Bedford Mission and Elim Mission.

At the time, two groups of Germans inhabited Kaiser-Wilhelmsland. The largest group were the entrepreneurs, plantation owners, officials of the German New Guinea Company, and government functionaires living in Finschhafen and Madang, and at plantations along the coast. They viewed groups they encountered, differently than did the evangelical Lutherans at Finschhafen, Sattelberg, and the filial mission statements along the coast.

Following a dispute with the German New Guinea Company, Pastor Gottfried Schmutterer from the Neuendettelsau Mission Society was forced to relocate his original mission camp in July 1912 and was offered a location on the banks of the Bumbu known as Ampo. The Ampo Lutheran Church was built in 1937 and later used as a WW2 field hospital and remains the oldest building in Lae. Several Lutheran churches, schools and headquarter buildings now occupy the surrounds.

In the 1920s, the Lutheran Church had a significant impact on the Butibum and Malahang communities and garnered a great deal of loyalty to the faith. By way of example, in 1971, the Roman Catholic mission decided to erect a church in the Bumbu settlement to serve the Sepik community there. The Butibum people generally regarded this move as sacrilege because they believed their lands, on which the new church stands, are hallowed by the Lutheran faith.

== 1900s ==
In the first years of the 20th century, shipping lines had established scheduled services with refrigerated holds and agricultural products from the colonies, exotic fruits and spices, were sold to the public in Germany proper. Geologists and cartographers explored what were the unmarked regions on European maps, identifying mountains and rivers, and demarcating boundaries. Hermann Detzner and one Captain Nugent, R.A., had charge of a joint project to demarcate the British and German frontiers of Cameroon, which was published in 1913.

Travelers and newspaper reporters brought back stories of black and brown natives serving German managers and settlers. There were also suspicions and reports of colonial malfeasance, corruption and brutality in some protectorates, and Lutheran and Roman Catholic missionaries dispatched disturbing reports to their mission headquarters in Germany. (Note: p. 178)

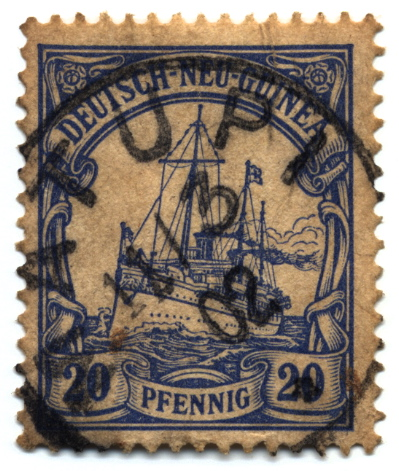
20-pfennig "Yacht", postmarked Matupi, 11 March 1902

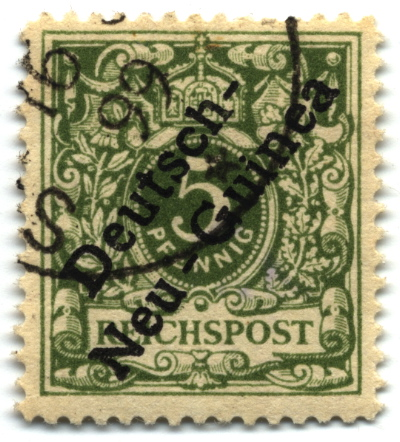
5-pfennig overprint of 1897 used in 1899, probably at Stephansort

In 1900, the Neuendettelsau Mission Society imported cattle from Australia to the mission stations at Malahang and Finschhafen however Tick fever caused many losses. Eventually the Malahang mission sold cattle to locals for $70 per head.

In 1910, the Gabmatsung/Gabmazung Lutheran mission station was established at Nadzab. and established an airfield for use by small planes until the outbreak of the Pacific War when it became overgrown with dense kunai grass.

In 1914, the Neuendettelsau Mission Society purchased land for their plantation and gave a gift of cattle to the local people.

In 1919, the Melbourne Argus newspaper ran this classified advertisement:

The following items, collected by on Official with the Aid of An Armed Force from Gabmatsung (and other districts) -carved figures, stone clubs, carved plates, bows and arrows, spears, native drum, clubs, horns, modlooms, native pillows, head dresses, bags, shells ornaments and butterflies. JW Styles and Son, Glenhuntly Rd, Caufield

In the years before the outbreak of the Great War, British colonial officers viewed the Germans as deficient in "colonial aptitude", but "whose colonial administration was nevertheless superior to those of the other European states.

=== World War 1 ===
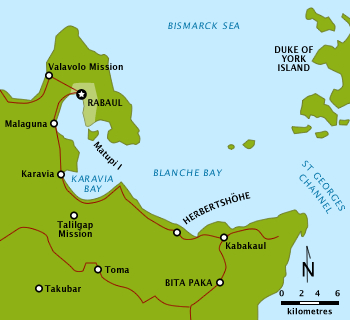
Vicinity of Rabaul, Blanche Bay and Bita Paka on the Gazelle Peninsula, New Britain.

Following Britain's declaration of war on Imperial Germany on 4 August 1914 and the outbreak of the First World War, Australia and the other members of the British Empire were automatically involved. Within days, the creation of the Australian Imperial Force (AIF) was created and on 6 August 1914, London cabled its acceptance of the force and asked that it be sent as soon as possible.

Meanwhile, after an additional British request for assistance on 6 August 1914, the Australian government hurriedly prepared another expeditionary force (Australian Naval and Military Expeditionary Force) to destroy the German wireless stations at Yap in the Caroline Islands, Nauru, and Rabaul (Battle of Bita Paka) in New Britain.

Following the Cameroon surveying project, Hermann Detzner was tasked to survey the border of Australian Papua and Kaiser-Wilhelmsland and during this expedition and unbeknownst to Detzner, war was declared. In his book published in 1920, Vier Jahre unter Kannibalen ("Four Years among Cannibals") Detzner claims to have penetrated the interior of Kaiser-Wilhelmsland but these claims were disputed by various German missionaries and later recanted in 1932.

On 24 September, the German colony at Madang on Kaiser-Wilhelmsland (the New Guinea mainland) was occupied by the Australian forces. Shortly after all remaining German possessions were captured in the region and the Australian Naval and Military Expeditionary Force provided occupation forces for the duration of the war. (Note: p. 105-126) The military government continued until 1921. The Australian military administration continued the exploitative economic policies of the previous German colonial administration, and official policy was to continue the status quo, including the use of indentured Melanesian labor on plantations, the levy of the "native head tax" and official floggings, or corporal punishment. (Note: p. 219-233) Under the terms of the German surrender, German civilians could remain as long as they swore an oath of neutrality. Those who refused were later transported to Australia, where they could freely travel back to Germany. (Note: p. 37, Hiery suggests the German colonial policies in the Pacific were liberal when compared to the subsequent policies initiated by later administrations)

Both in the British Empire and, eventually in the United States, it was feared that Germany eventually would make a bid for world hegemony by means of an African conscript army. The Allies felt they had a responsibility to protect the natives from Prussian militarism and German technological developments which would threaten the security of the British Empire (Note: p. 154–.364)

On 9 January 1915, command of the colony was handed over to Brigadier General Sir Samuel Pethebridge, the former Secretary of the Department of Defence. (Note: p. 154–155) Although required by international law to follow the German forms of government, the territory gradually acquired the appearance of a British colony. (Note: p. 154–364) As a result of the peace settlement under the Treaty of Versailles in 1919, Germany lost all of its colonial possessions, including German New Guinea. The colony became the Territory of New Guinea, a League of Nations Mandate Territory under Australian administration. It remained as such until 1949, when it was merged with the Australian territory of Papua to become the Territory of Papua and New Guinea, which eventually became modern Papua New Guinea.

=== Confiscation ===
(see List of former German colonies)

Germany's overseas empire was dismantled following defeat in World War I. With the concluding Treaty of Versailles, Article 22, German colonies were divided between Belgium, the United Kingdom, and certain British Dominions, France, and Japan with the determination not to see any of them returned to Germany – a guarantee secured by Article 119.

In the Pacific, Japan gained Germany's islands north of the equator (the Marshall Islands, the Carolines, the Marianas, the Palau Islands) and Kiautschou in China. German Samoa was assigned to New Zealand; German New Guinea, the Bismarck Archipelago and Nauru Australia in effective control, formally together with United Kingdom and New Zealand to Australia. President Wilson saw the League of Nations as "'residuary trustee' for the [German] colonies" captured and occupied by "rapacious conquerors".

After World War I, many of the Germanic names were replaced by English or Indigenous ones. Adolf Haven was then referred to as Morobe Harbor.

Soon after the establishment of British New Guinea in the 1880s, a system of patrols Kiaps was established to expand the government's administrative control beyond the major towns. The system continued after the change from British to Australian administration in 1905. The Kiap system was used following the League of Nations Mandate. The kiaps patrolled at a time when cannibalism was still practised in parts of PNG.

Australian Officials or Kiaps were stationed at various locations within the province and in 1921, the military administration transitioned to a civilian administration, a gold prospector named Cecil John Levien was appointed District Officer (Kiap) of Morobe.

== 1920–1930 ==
On 1 January 1923, Levien acquired a mining right for the area and shortly after formed a syndicate called "Guinea Gold (No Liability)".

The Guinea Gold syndicate formed Guinea Airways Limited in November 1927.

In 1927, Levien arranged for the construction of the airstrip at Lae to assist the gold mine productions around Wau.

The first flight into the airfield was a DH-37 flown by E. A. "Pard" Mustar. The aircraft was shipped from Essendon Airport to Rabaul on the S.S. Melusia and flown to Lae on 31 March 1927.

From 1922 to 1942, the airfield was part of a massive airlift operation to service the Bulolo goldfields and was one of the largest airlift operations in the world. Junkers W34 tri-motor planes were ideal and the German Junkers aeroplanes played a major part in the exploration and development of what is today Papua New Guinea. To mine the gold required the construction on site of several 1500+ ton dredges with the heaviest part scaling over 3 tons.

The first Junkers W34 B, VH-UGZ (c/n 2601 CoR 195-crashed Wau 6 March 1930), was bought disassembled in big crates to New Guinea and made its test flight on 10 April 1928. The first two G31s were called Peter and Paul, the third simply G31. This aircraft could carry two passengers and a ton of freight in the cargo compartment. In the first 19 days of operation, the W34 No 1 earned gross revenue of £2,649 with field costs of £360. The second W34 was ordered on 8 June 1928 and arrived in December. By then, No 1 W34 had carried 500 passengers and 300 tons of freight. Guinea Airways eventually purchased five of these simple, rugged and honest Junkers machines unmatched at the time by any other manufacturer. The aircraft could be loaded or unloaded in 15 minutes through a large open hatch on the roof with the gantry crane above the aircraft.

Lae was declared a town under the New Guinea Boundaries Ordinance on 31 March 1931 at the height of the gold rush era.

Lae became the prototype for New Guinean towns built up around airstrips.

The main township of Lae was originally on the flats between Voco Point and the airfield. The site was later shifted to the terraces above where the elite had lived in the days before the war.

The Europeans lived to the East of Lae Airfield while the New Guineans lived to the West. Cargo arrived in Lae and then was transported by air to the goldfields in Wau.

== 1930–1945 ==
In July 1937, Lae made world news when American aviator Amelia Earhart was last seen flying out of the airport on her way back to the United States. She was never seen again.

When the volcanic eruptions occurred in Rabaul in 1937, a decision was made to transfer the capital of the Territory of New Guinea to Lae. World War II got in the way of the transfer and the town was occupied by the Empire of Japan on 8 March 1942. Lae, Rabaul and Salamaua became the major Japanese bases in New Guinea.

=== World War 2 ===
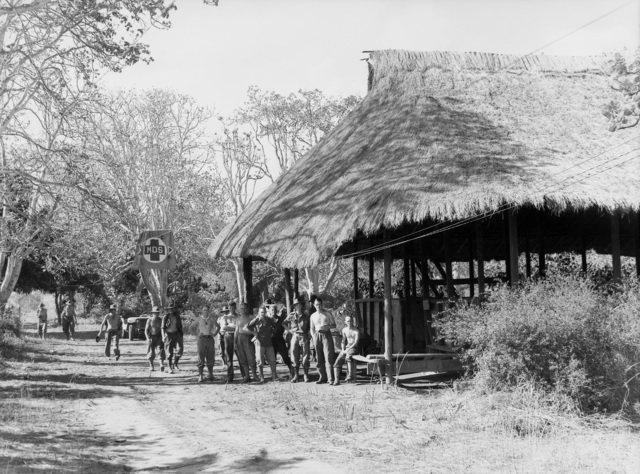
The Admission Centre of the 2/4th Australian Field Ambulance Main Dressing Station, 7th Australian Division, formerly the Gabmatzung Lutheran Mission Church.

On 8 March 1942, the Imperial Japanese landed at Malahang Beach as part of the Invasion of Lae-Salamaua during World War II. Malahang airfield was upgraded by the Japanese so the runway was 800 feet (240 m) long by 50 feet (15 m) wide and used as satellite of Lae Airport.

The naval Battle of the Bismarck Sea in March 1943 was fought over the Japanese attempt to reinforce Lae with troops sent by sea from Rabaul, an attempt foiled by sustained Allied attack on the Japanese troop transports. In mid-1943, after defeats in the Kokoda Track campaign, the Battle of Buna–Gona and the Battle of Wau, the Japanese retreated to Lae and Salamaua. However, the Salamaua–Lae campaign involved many weeks of fierce fighting, before the town fell to the Allies on 16 September.

Lyndon B. Johnson was appointed Lieutenant Commander in the United States Naval Reserve on 21 June 1940. Eleven B-26 Marauder's of the 22nd Bomb Group departed Townsville on 8 June 1942, arrived in Port Moresby and raided Lae on 9 June 1942. The mission was called "TOW 9" and Lieutenant Commander Johnson, the future 36th President of the United States, went on this raid as an observer on the aircraft, the Heckling Hare. (Note: The aircraft the Heckling Hare (#40-1488) was probably named after the cartoon The Heckling Hare.) (Note: The aircraft was also known as the Arkansas Traveller.) Nine days after the raid, Johnson was awarded a Silver Star medal for his participation in the above bombing raid.

The Landing at Nadzab was the first parachute jump for the 503rd Parachute Regiment on 5 September 1943. In conjunction with the Amphibious Landing East of Malahang, was to be the start of the liberation of Lae from Japanese Occupation. On 4 September, the Australian 9th Division, under Major General George Wootten, landed east of Lae, on "Red Beach" and "Yellow Beach", near Malahang. The 2/13th Battalion (20th Brigade) landed at Yellow Beach and pushed east, on toward Hopoi Mission Station West and then to Finschhafen.

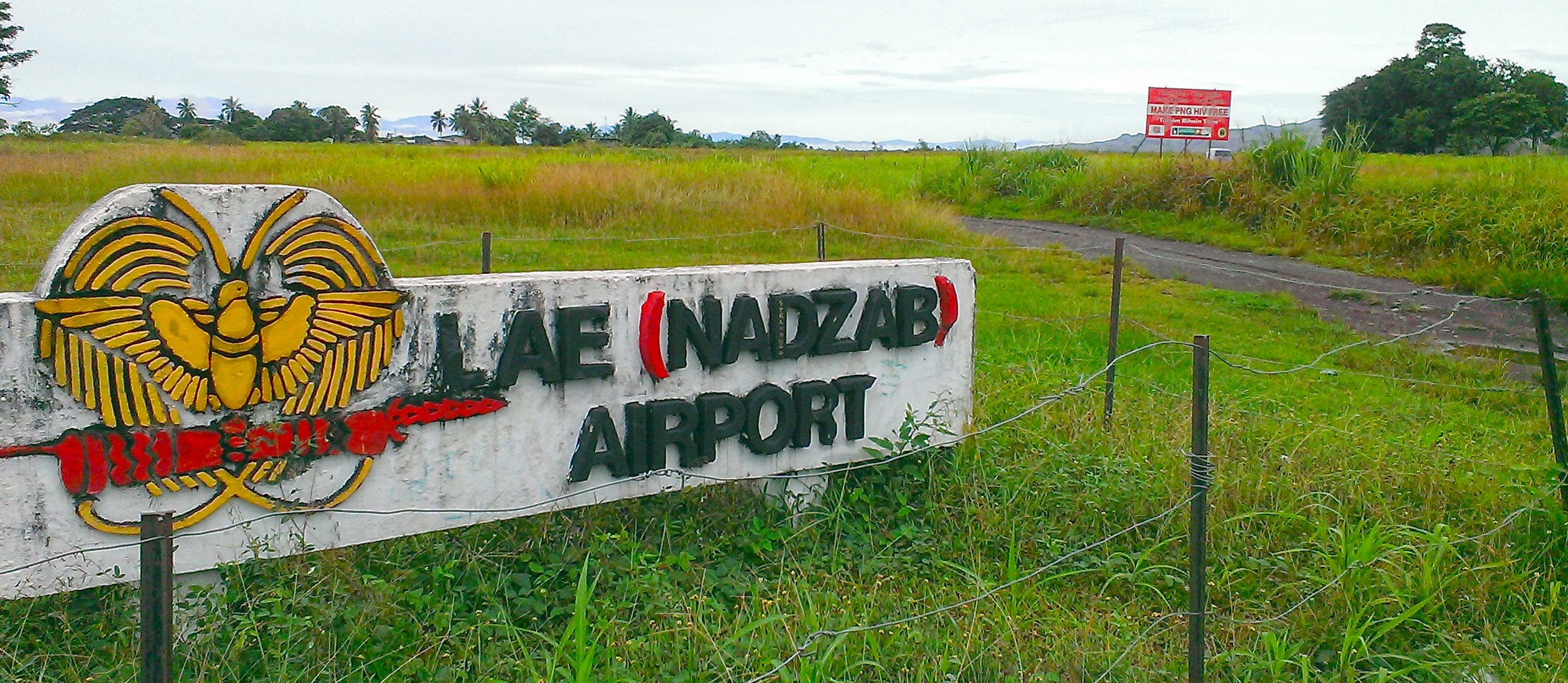
Photo of Nadzab airport sign. Village in background

Situm is located to the north of the beaches where the Australian 7th Division carried out an amphibious landing in September 1943, as part of plans to capture Lae from the Japanese during the Salamaua–Lae campaign. During that campaign and the subsequent advance into the Finisterre Range, the locals assisted the Allied troops and after the war, the Australian 7th Division AIF Association helped construct a school at Situm in 1964 as a form of gratitude.

The 68th Australian Women's Army Service barracks was located on Butibum Road at the base of Mount Lunaman near the present location of Sir Ignatius Kilage Stadium. (Note: Location assumed from photographic analysis/ See external links.) The barracks were constructed by army engineers and New Guinean workers and the compound perimeter was enclosed by a high barbed wire fence patrolled by armed guards. Many women considered the high fences a symbol of constraint and the popular song Don't Fence me In, was often sung.

Before the construction of the Highlands Highway, a road in the Atzera foothills in the Markham Valley connected Nadzab with Lae and a rough trail on the other side of the Atzeras paralleled this road from Lae to Yalu. Edward's Plantation was located around 5 Mile, Heath's Plantation around 6 Mile, Lane's Plantation and Whittaker's Plantation around 9 Mile and Jensen's Plantation around 10 Mile. On 10 September the 25th Australian Infantry Brigade moved East from Nadzab towards Lae along the Atzera foothills often with fierce battles through these plantations while the 9th Division approached Lae from the East. On 16 September both units converged on Lae.

After Lae was liberated from Japanese occupation, 7th Division's Brigadier Eather set off by jeep to replace the Japanese flag on Mount Lunamen with the Australian flag.

== 1945–1970 ==
In 1954, Australian farmers assisted the Malahang mission further establish their herd: "Twenty five Shorthorn heifers have been flown from Cairns in North Queensland, to Lae in New Guinea, to form the nucleus of a beef herd at the Lutheran Mission there. The heifers were donated to the mission by Mr. A.W Anderson and were aged from 11 to 13 months. They averaged 400 lb. each. Two trips were made by an especially chartered DC3 to get the cattle to New Guinea. The cattle were brought from Julia Creek to Mackay and then taken to the Atherton Tableland where they were rested and inoculated. Twelve head were taken on the first trip. The landed cost of the heifers in Lae, which is about 650 miles from Cairns, was approximately £60 per head compared with £110 for the estimated cost of shipping. Charter fees for the DC3 were £1200. Mr, W. W. Meuser. who came to Cairns to supervise the loading of the shipment, said that Mr. P. Kidd, of Malanda, in North Queensland, would buy a Santa Gertrudis bull to mate with the heifers. The European and native staffs of the mission consume considerable amounts of beef"

On 24 October 1959, the first Lae Agricultural show was run:

The Morobe Lae Showgrounds are located in Dowsett. The first Morobe Show was held in 1959, but on three occasions the Show had to be cancelled. In 1983, Lae was isolated by floods and in 1991, law and order problems caused a curfew to be imposed from 6 am to 6 pm. In 2009, an outbreak of cholera in the province made it unwise to have a large gathering of people.

Flora Shaw Stewart (1886–1979) was a founding member of the Morobe Agricultural Society and would often lead the grand parades at annual shows.

In the livestock section, dairy cattle were the strongest exhibit. The cattle came from the Lutheran Mission at Malahang, Mrs. Jensen's dairy, both near Lae and the Department of Agriculture and Stock and Fisheries' (DASF) property Erap

The mission owned 1,250 acres of coconut plantations; produced copra; grew vegetables; raised poultry, cattle, and other animals; and operated sawmills.

The cattle herd was built up to more than 150 head and a dairy was established. In 1955, Tropical Dairies became the first in PNG to supply pasteurised milk in cartons. By 1961, Malahang was producing some 32,000 gallons of milk per year.

In 1962, the main strip at Nadzab was resealed by the Australian Commonwealth Department of Works and lengthened to make it suitable for Mirage fighters, even though they never materialised. However, it was always maintained by the Australian Department of Civil Aviation as an alternative to Lae in poor weather conditions.

Today, the former 'East Base' or No. 1 & No. 2 runways are still in use by Air Niugini and for civil aviation, mainly servicing Lae which is 45 kilometres (28 mi) away. Roads in the area were built by American forces.

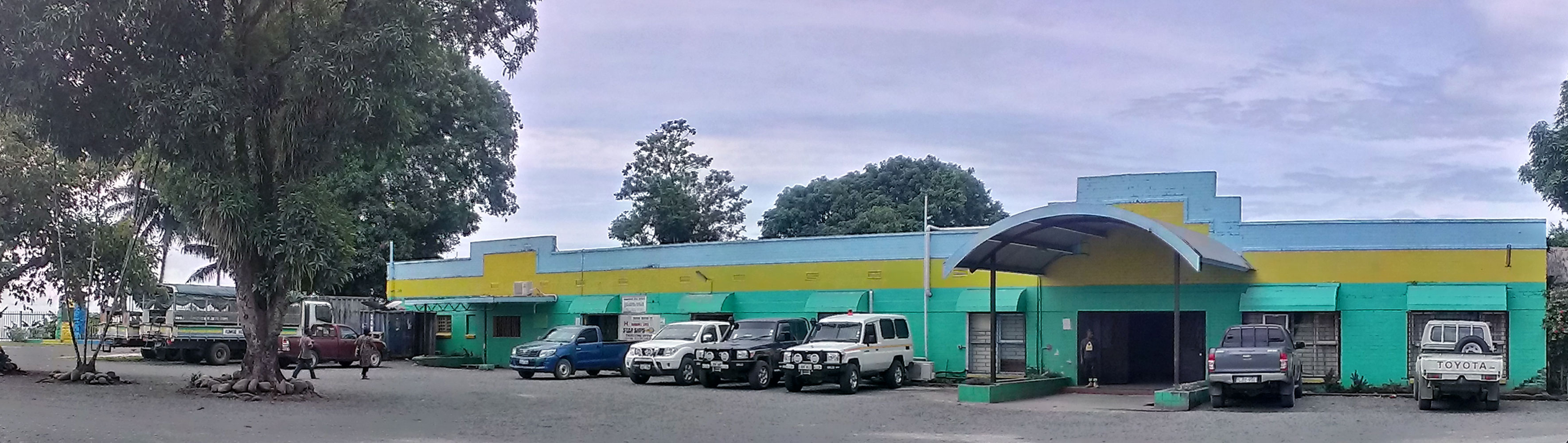
Old RSL building overlooking Huon Gulf.

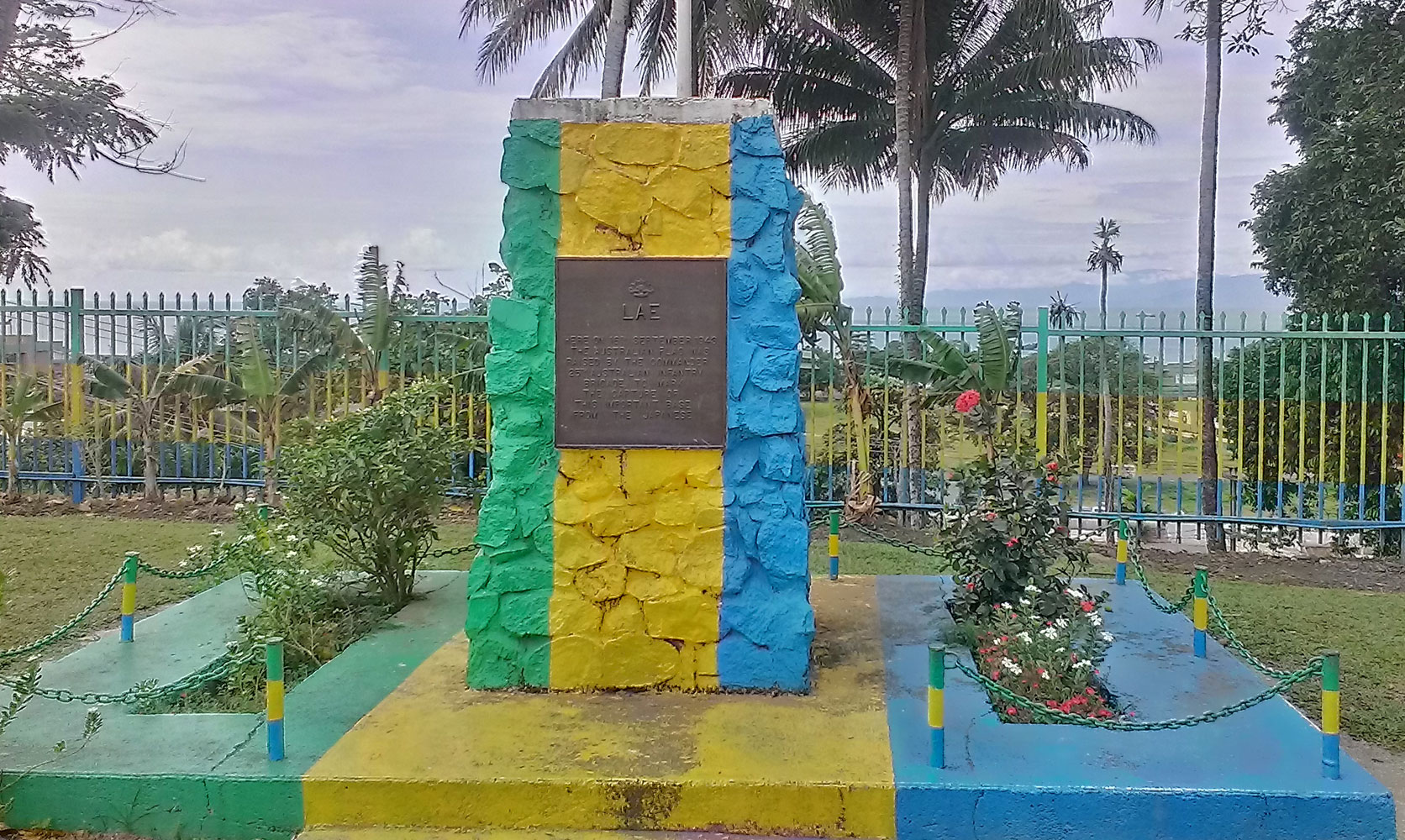
Monument at the old RSL building. Site marks the location when on 16 September 1943 Kenneth Eather from 25th Brigade raised the Australian flag following the defeat of the Japanese.

== 1970–1990s ==
In 1971, the Australian Colonial Administration established the first properly constituted Local Government of Lae town and in 1972, Lae was proclaimed a city.

Lae's development after the war is directly linked to the development of the highlands. Coffee and tea were being grown and a port was needed. Later priority was given on road access, and the Highlands Highway came into existence. The mineral boom occurred in the 1980s and 1990s.

By 1977, the old Lae Airfield was not as popular as the Nadzab Airport, a United States Air Force base, became operational. Fierce political squabbling over the pros and cons of Lae and Nadzab continued until 1982, when, in an unsolved mystery, the Lae airport terminal was burned down.

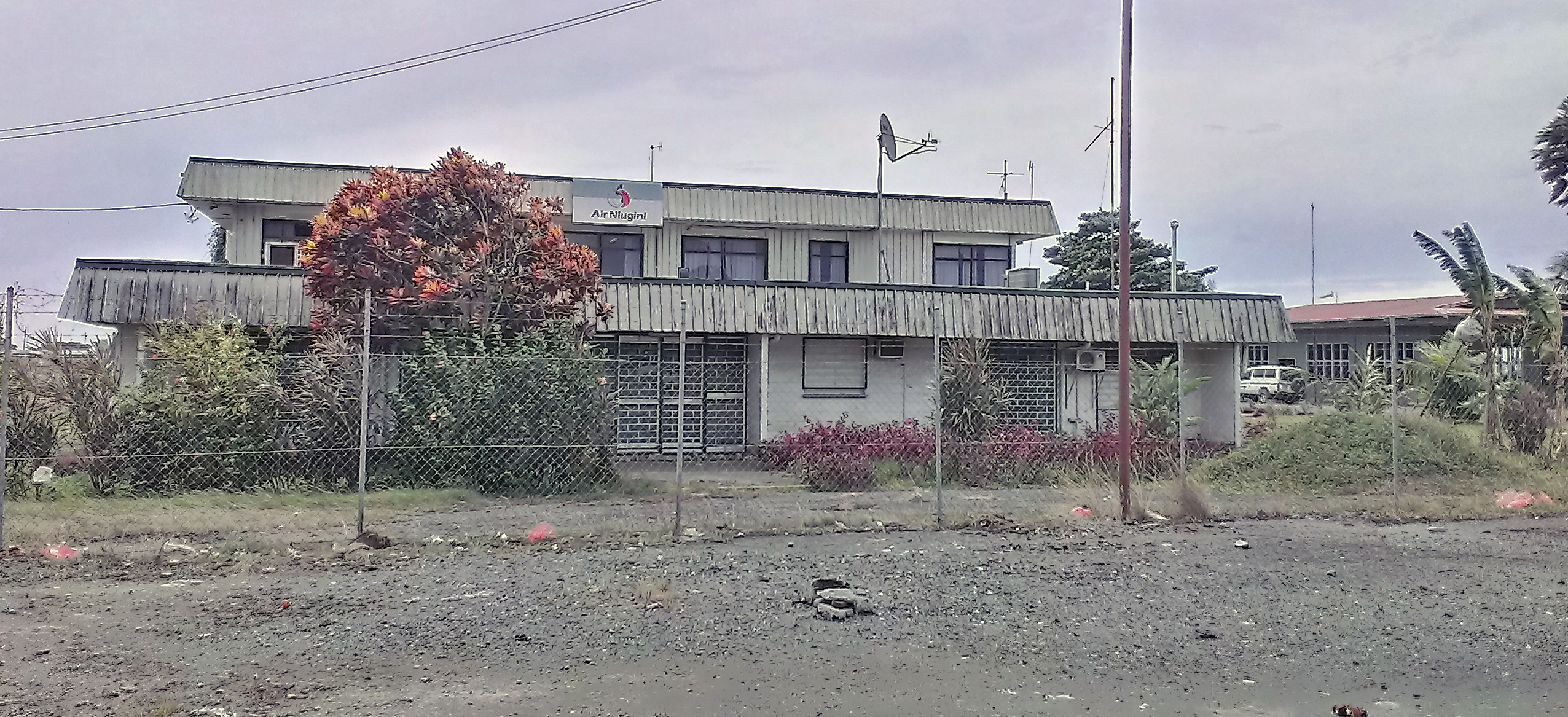
Photo of original Air Niugini terminal at old Lae airfield. Taken 29 January 2014

Lae airfield continued to be used by Air Niugini and other third-level airlines until 1987. It was also used as the base for the Papua New Guinea Defence Force until it was transferred to Port Moresby in 1992.

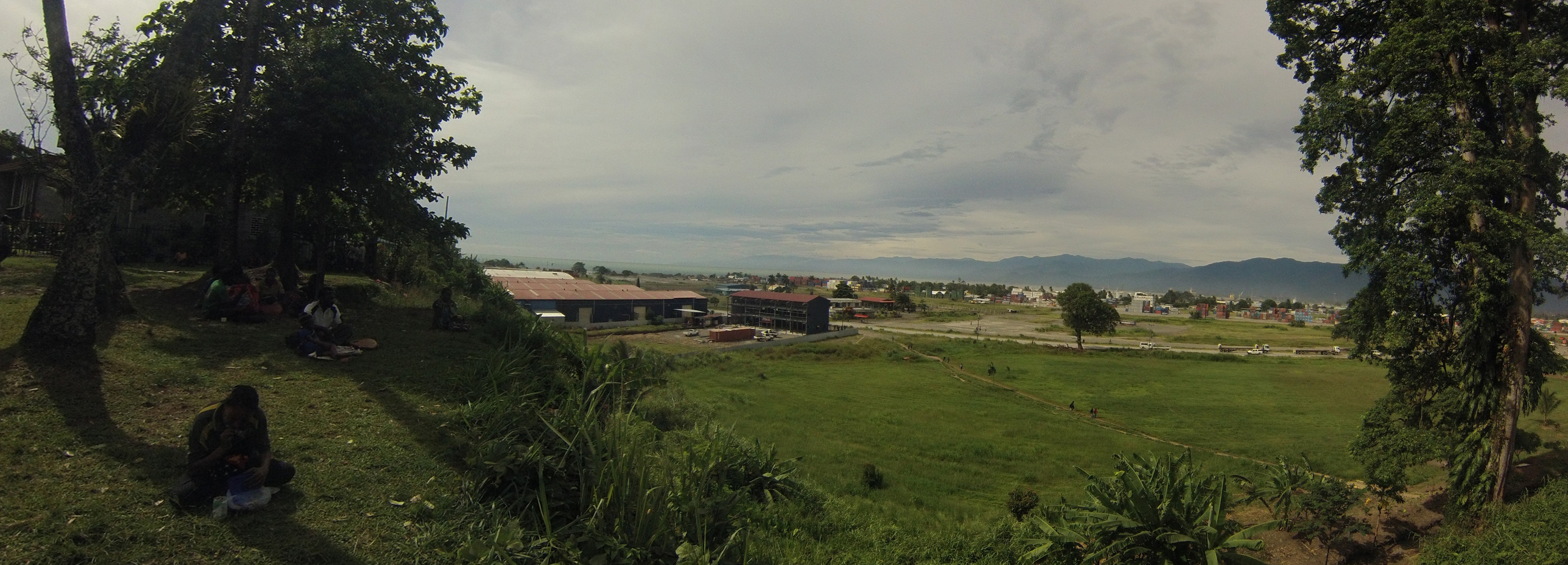
Photo overlooking the old Lae airfield from "Top Town" – Lae CBD. At the bottom of the photo is the Amelia Earhart memorial. Photo taken 29 January 2014

Between December 1983 and July 1992, Lae experienced two major flood and mudslide disasters. In both cases, hundreds of people lost their homes. The 1983 floods remain the worst since the establishment of the town in the late 1920s. These floods left hundreds of people homeless particularly those living along the banks of the Bumbu River. Many houses were damaged or completely destroyed and hundreds of people at the Five Mile settlement along the Highlands Highway were also affected by mudslides.

Meanwhile, provincial and national leaders met to find solutions to the problem of how to resettle people displaced by the disaster and to the north of the city a block of land was allocated, planned and developed for the resettlement of the disaster victims. This 'Tensiti' settlement was developed in 1992 on the former Serafini plantation with sealed road networks, water and electricity.

During the 2007 floods, engineers were also working out how the flooding Bumbu River in Lae would be diverted to save residences at Admin Compound which were threatened by the floodwaters.

In 1991, Lae and Port Moresby hosted the South Pacific Games.

In 1997, Lae City Authority became the Lae Urban Local Level Government Council.

== 2000s ==
On 24 September 2011, the annual Papua New Guinea national rugby league team's match against the Australian Prime Minister's XIII took place outside Port Moresby for the first time at Sir Ignatius Kilage Stadium, which was packed to capacity for the match.

== See also ==
- List of former German colonies
- German New Guinea Company
- Brandenburger Gold Coast
- Imperial Colonial Office
- Reichskolonialbund
- Wilhelminism
- New Guinea
- List of colonial heads of New Guinea
- Unserdeutsch language
- Kaiser-Wilhelmsland
- HMAS AE1 (first Australian submarine)
