= Malahang Mission Station, Lae =

Coordinates: 6.705052°S 147.02627°E

The Malahang Mission Station is a Lutheran filial station situated in Malahang, Morobe Province in Papua New Guinea now under the auspices of the Evangelical Lutheran Church of Papua New Guinea. The Mission station is located on Busu Road, Malahang opposite the Malahang Industrial Area.

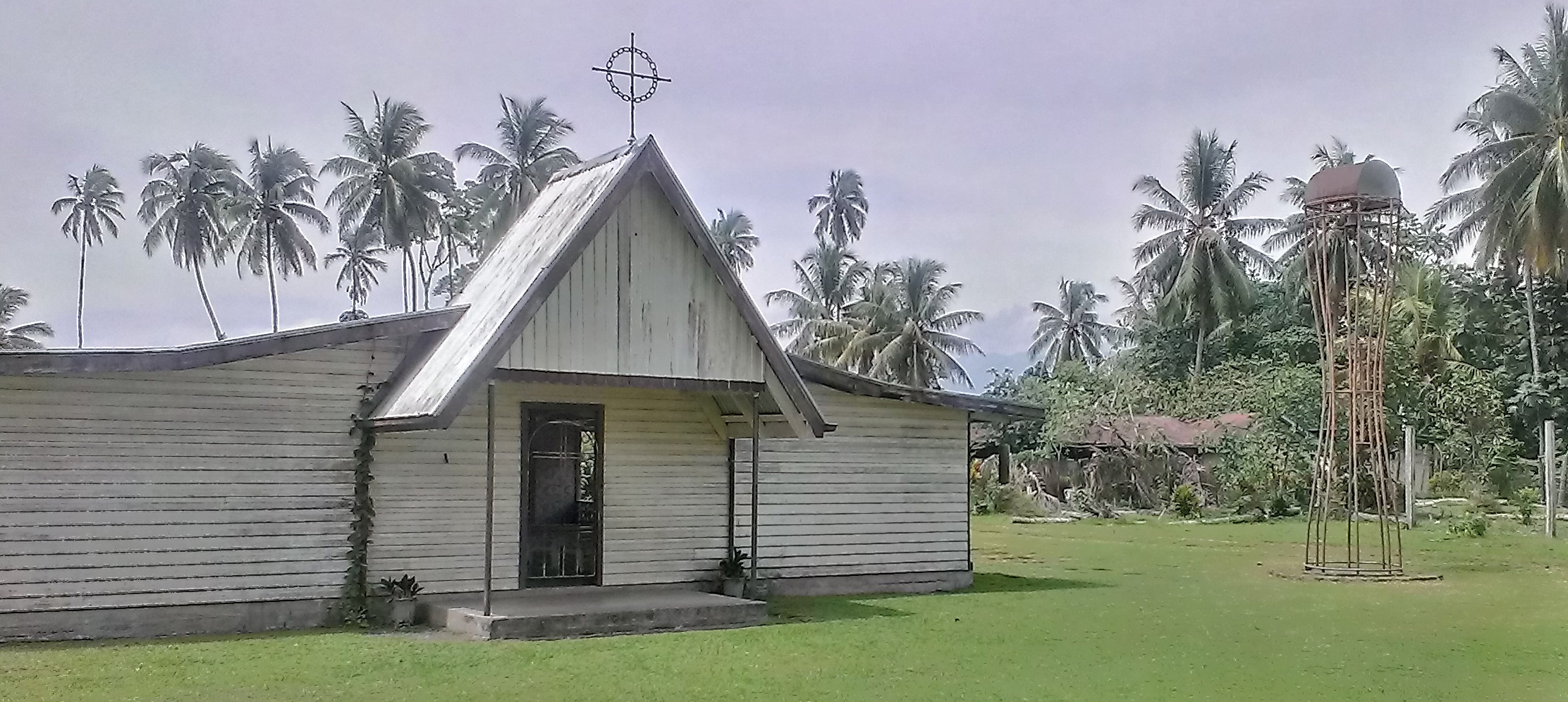
Photo of the Lutheran Church at Malahang Mission Station, Lae, Morobe Province. The new bell tower to the right of the picture.

== Location ==
The Malahang Mission Station is located on Busu Road Malahang, Lae directly opposite the Malahang Industrial area. The Malahang airfield (now the industrial area) serviced the Malahang Mission Station. The Lutheran University of Papua New Guinea, the Martin Luther Seminary, Balob Teachers College and the Evangelical Lutheran Church of PNG Headquarters are all located within kilometres of each other.

== History ==
On 12 July 1886, a German missionary, Johann Flierl, a pioneer missionary for the Southern Australian Lutheran Synod and the Neuendettelsau Mission Society, sailed to Simbang in Finschhafen, Kaiser-Wilhelmsland.

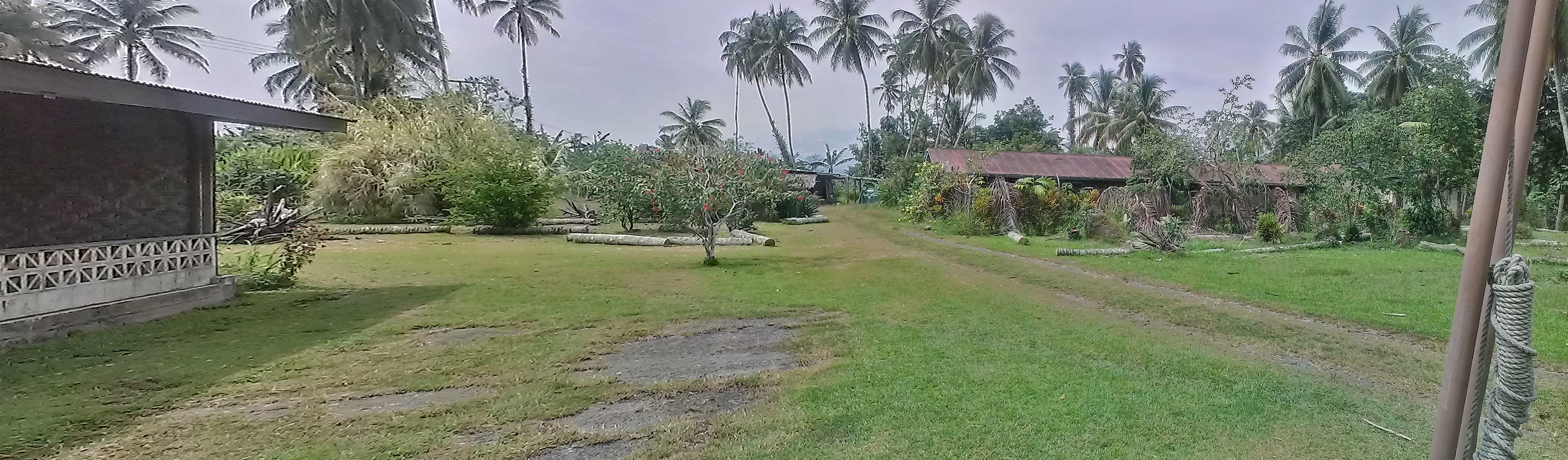
Photo of the old children's "prison". Lutheran Church to the left of the photo. Photo taken 30 January 2014

The Synod and the Mission Society sought to bring the "undiluted conviction" of the historical Lutheran confession to Australia and New Guinea. The German colony in Australia, similar to the German Lutheran colony in Missouri (US), had left Prussia in 1838 and the 1840s to escape "unionism," the movement toward uniformity of organisation and worship imposed upon them by the state. Wilhelm Löhe, a pastor at Neuendettelsau in Germany, brought a similar ideology to the Neuendettelsau Mission Society. The mission society provided clergy and religious education for Lutheran settlements in Missouri, Iowa and Ohio, Australia, and anywhere else "free thinking" Lutherans had settled.

Flierl sailed from the Cooper Creek mission in South Australia towards German New Guinea stopping at Queensland to establish the Cape Bedford Mission and Elim Mission.

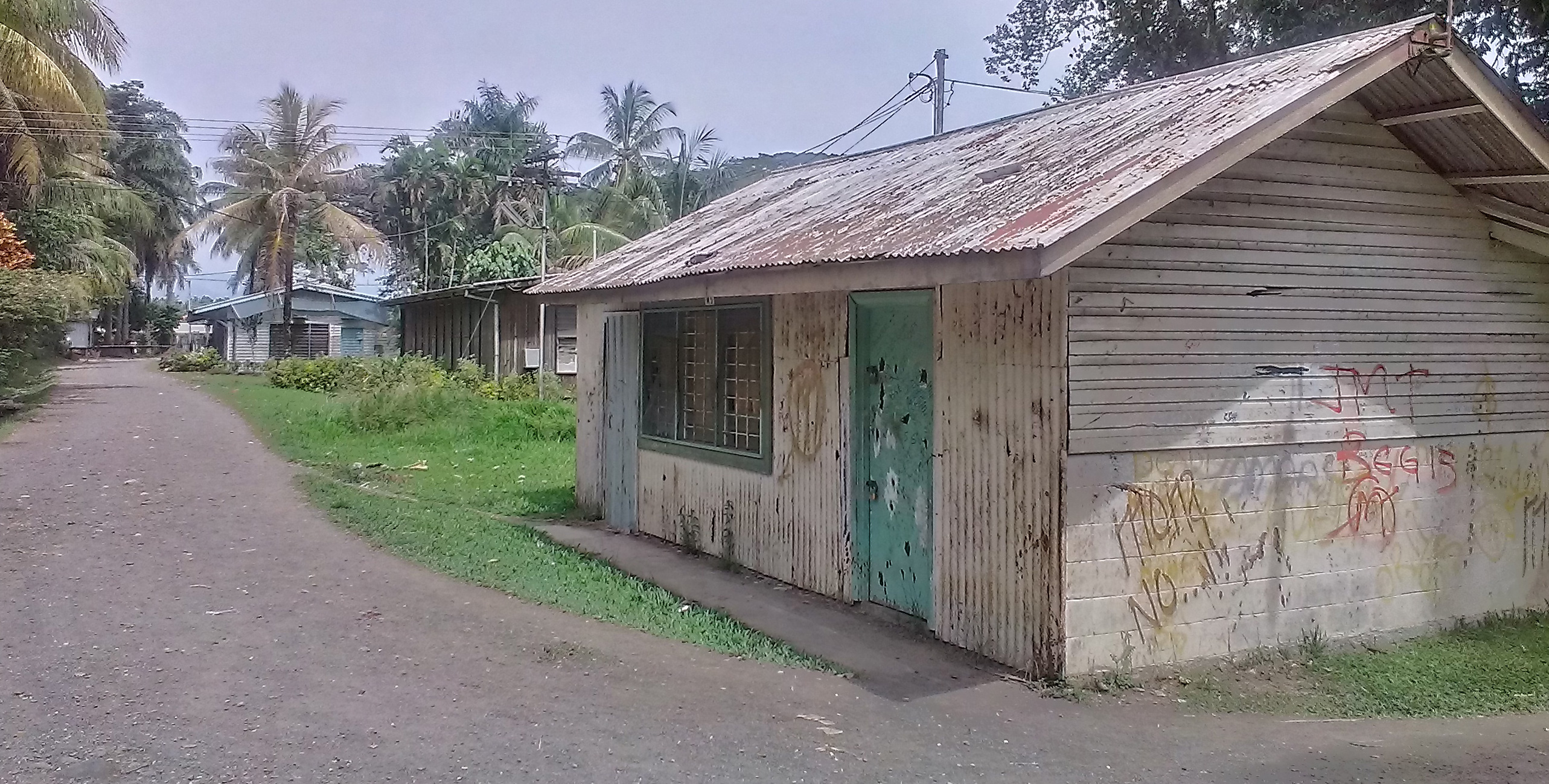
Photo of the main office at Malahang Mission Station, facing the entrance to Busu Road and the old Malahang airfield

At the time two groups of Germans inhabited Kaiser-Wilhelmsland. The largest group were the entrepreneurs, plantation owners, officials of the German New Guinea Company, and government functionaires living in Finschhafen and Madang, and at plantations along the coast. They viewed groups they encountered, differently than did the evangelical Lutherans at Finschhafen, Sattelberg, and the filial mission statements along the coast. Flierl however, saw them as children of God. For him, it was necessary to bring all children of God to the understanding of salvation and petitioned the Synod in Australia frequently for new missionaries, and in 1899, it sent Christian Keysser.

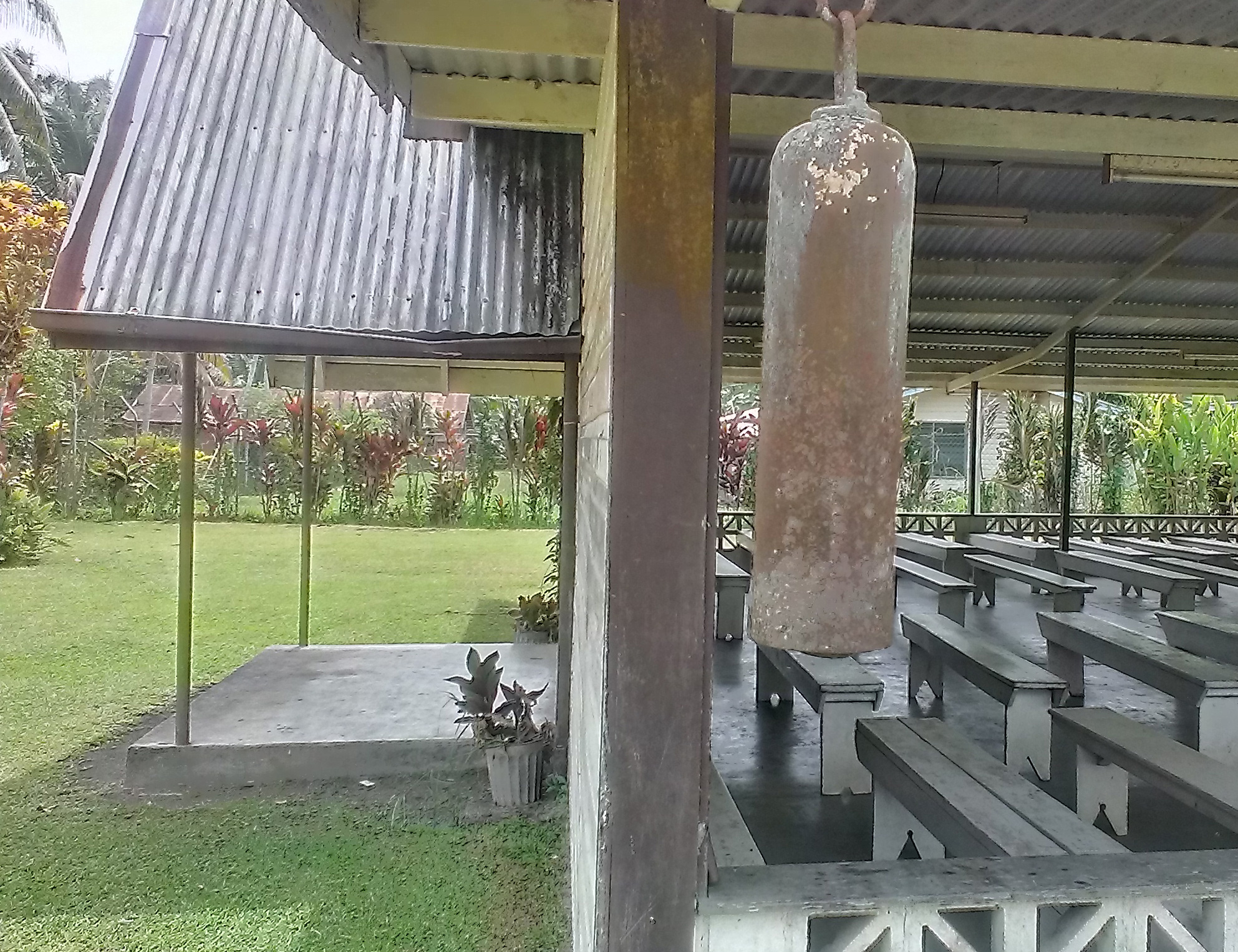
Photo of the original bell at the Lutheran Church

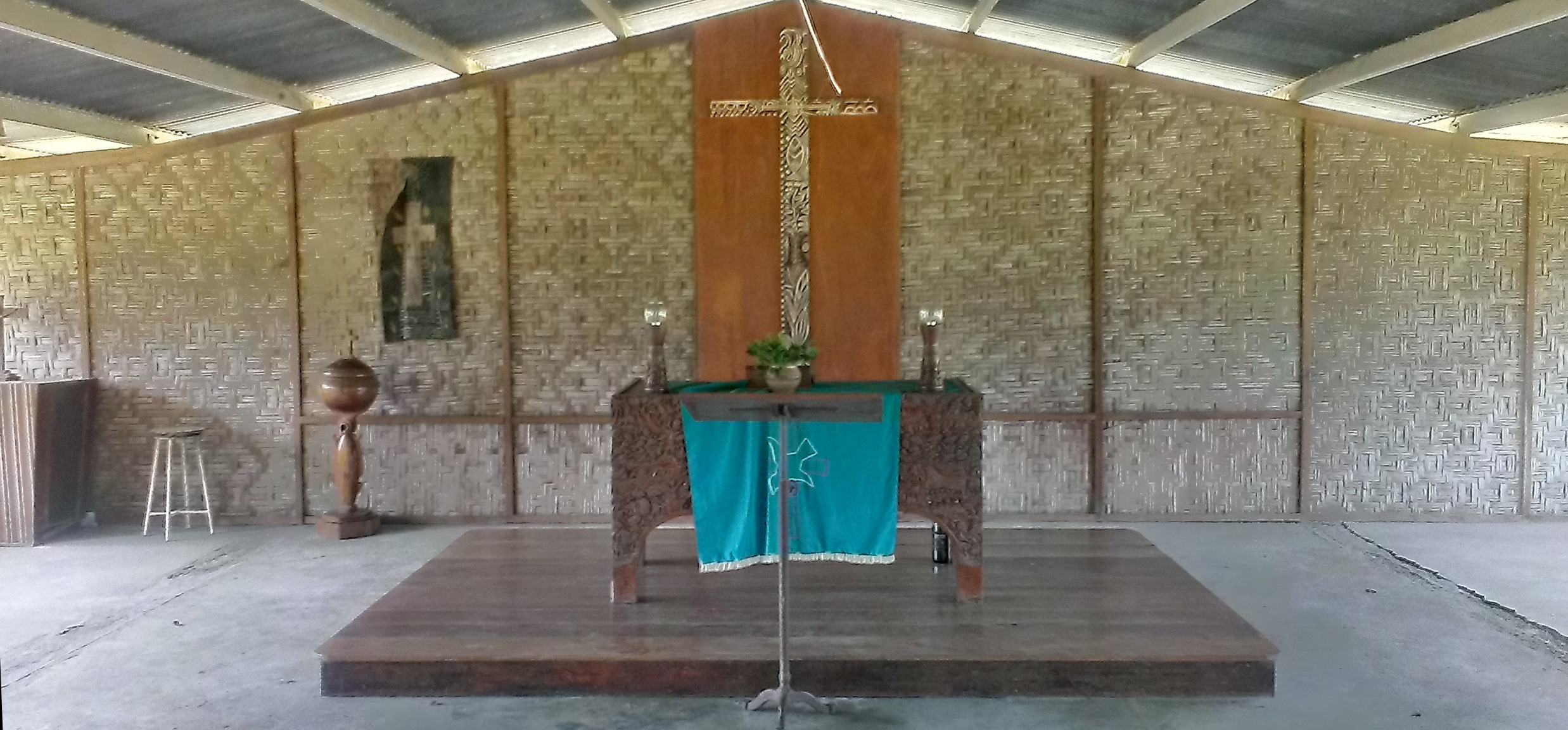
Photo of inside the Lutheran Church

The Ampo Lutheran Church is located a few kilometres from the Malahang Mission. According to The Adelaide Advertiser (21 October 1929), Personals Section;

Pastor (Gottfried) Schmutterer is on his way to join the Lutheran Mission in New Guinea, arrived by the German steamer Oder on Sunday. He will conduct a six-week tour in South Australia before proceeding to New Guinea with his wife. Pastor Schmutterer has spent 8 years at the mission previously but forced to abandon the work three years ago owing to ill-health

During World War II all missionaries left the area, and many mission stations, churches, schools and hospitals were damaged. In spite of this, the indigenous church leaders and local Christians stood firm in the work of the church. After the war the Lutheran churches in Australia and North America were asked to help reconstruct the church in Papua New Guinea, working together as the Lutheran Mission New Guinea.

In 1956 expatriate missionaries and indigenous church leaders gathered and formed the present indigenous church. At the time of its founding the church was called Evangelical Lutheran Church of New Guinea and its founding bishop was an expatriate missionary from the American Lutheran Church. The first indigenous bishop was elected in 1973. In 1975, on the eve of the country's independence, the name of the church was changed to Evangelical Lutheran Church of Papua New Guinea.

In 1977 the church was officially declared autonomous and another local Lutheran church organised by the Australian Lutheran Mission joined with the Evangelical Lutheran Church of Papua New Guinea.

=== World War II ===
Between April 1943 and July 1943, the Allied Geographical Section of South West Pacific Area (command) conducted reconnaissance after the Japanese invasion. The Terrain Handbook states at page 18;

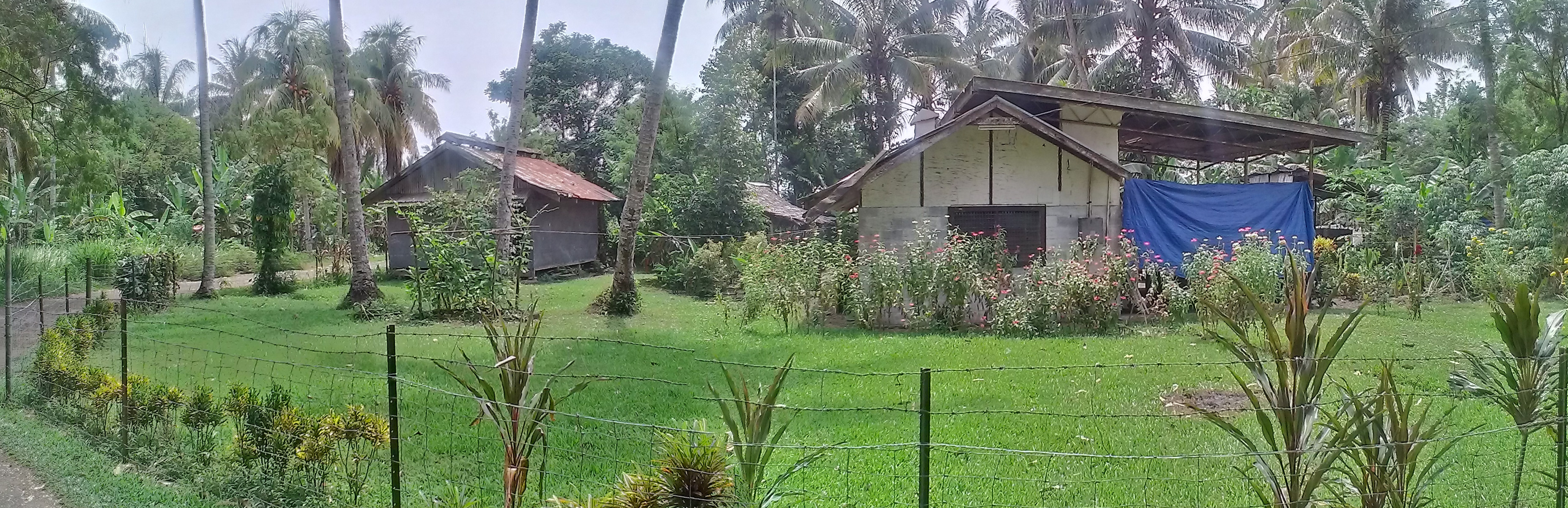
Photo of the old library at Malahang Mission Station

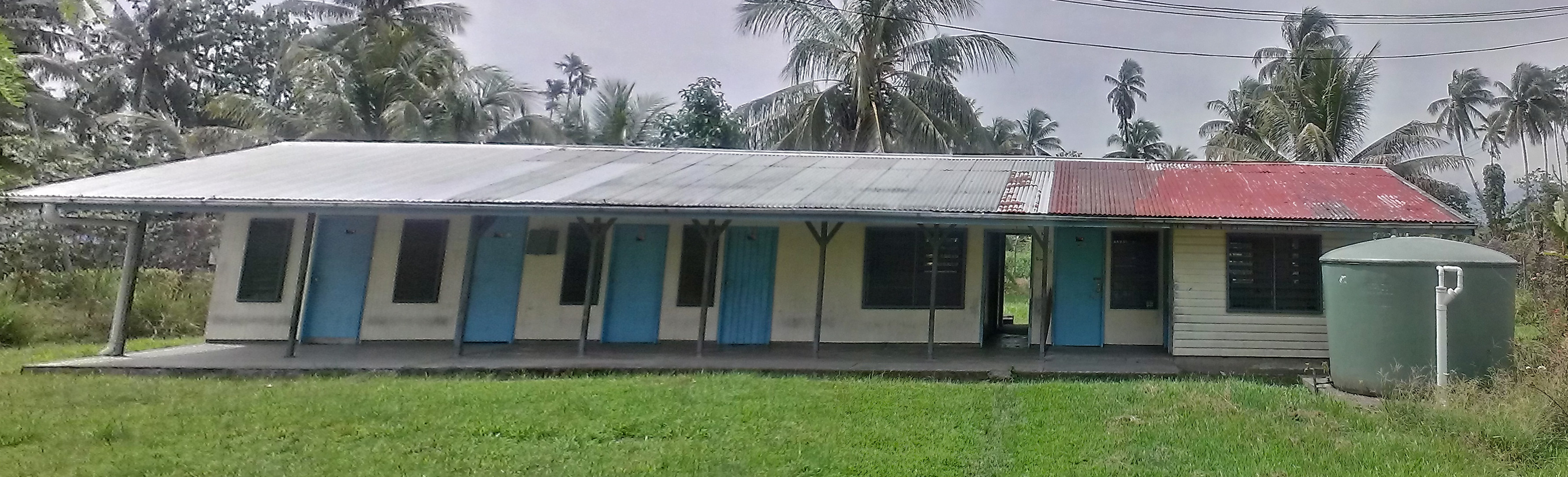
Photo of the visitors barracks at Malahang Mission Station

Lutheran Mission 2 miles NE of Lae. Staff now in Australia. Was equipped with a radio telephone, but equipment removed by administration. Large airdrome with repair workshops 1 mile to NE. Sawmill (with tractor) 2 miles to north. Plantation to north or airdrome. Plantation. 3 miles NE. 300 acres coconuts, also sawmill to north of plantation. House, trade, store, copra store. Owned by Lutheran mission Photograph 14 (Photo 13 depicts teachers house (see workshop photo), church, native school, mission house)Malahang Airfield is three miles NE of Lae. 600 x 90 yds wide. Runs NW/SE (131 degrees).Extensions possible at present suitable for limited types of aircraft only. There were two hangars on NE edge of clearing. A clearing 80 x 200 yds has been made at the NW end.

== Agriculture ==
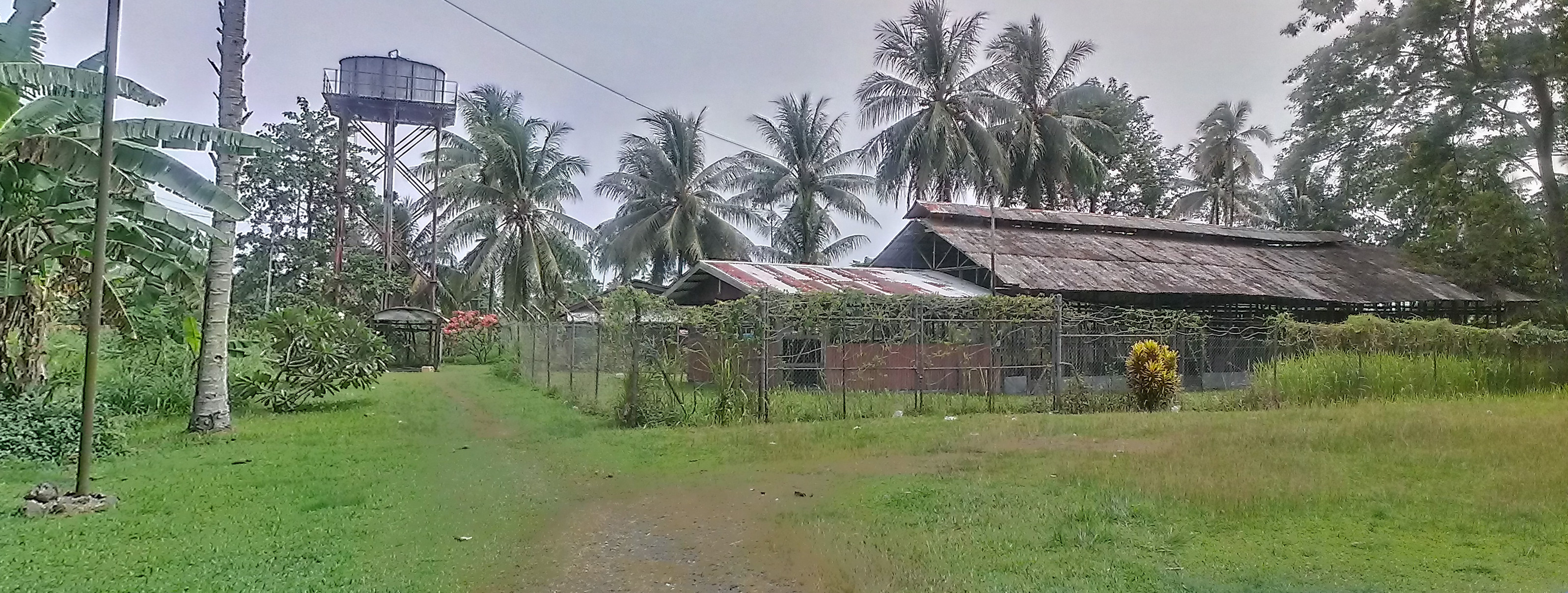
Photo of the old chicken shed at Malahang Mission Station

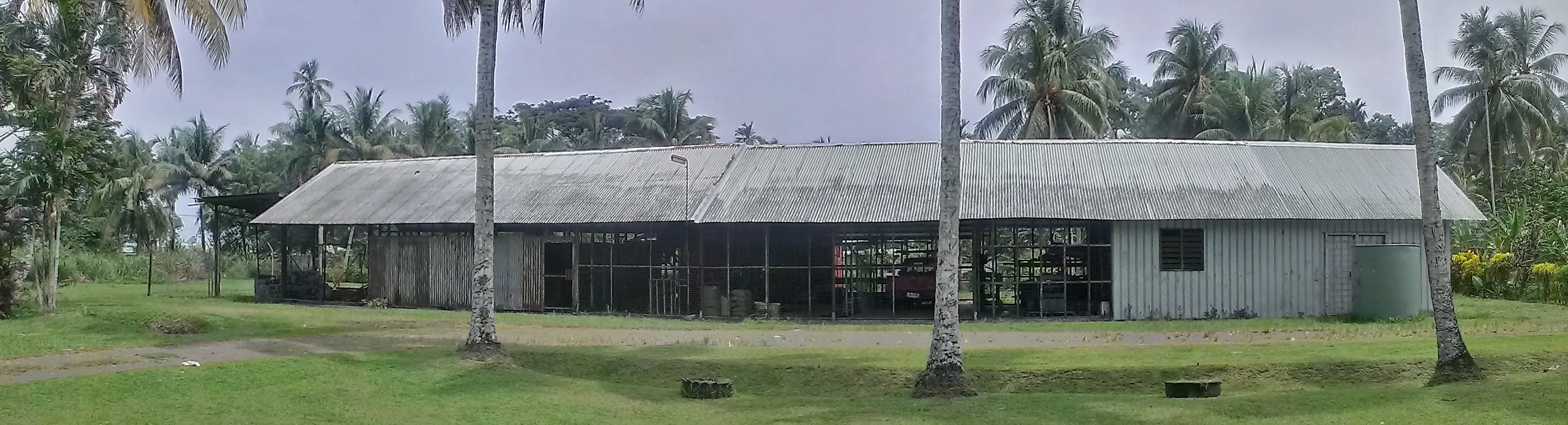
Photo of the old workshop

In 1900 the Neuendettelsau Mission Society imported cattle from Australia to the mission stations at Malahang and Finschhafen however tick fever caused many losses. Eventually the Malahang mission sold cattle to locals for $70 per head.

In 1914 the mission purchased land for their plantation and gave a gift of cattle to the local people.

In 1954, Australian farmers assisted the mission further establish their herd;

"Twenty five Shorthorn heifers have been flown from Cairns in North Queensland, to Lae in New Guinea, to form the nucleus of a beef herd at the Lutheran Mission there. The heifers were donated to the mission by Mr. A.W Anderson and were aged from 11 to 13 months. They averaged 400 lb. each. Two trips were made by an especially chartered DC3 to get the cattle to New Guinea. The cattle were brought from Julia Creek to Mackay and then taken to the Atherton Tableland where they were rested and inoculated. Twelve head were taken on the first trip. The landed cost of the heifers in Lae, which is about 650 miles from Cairns, was approximately £60 per head compared with £110 for the estimated cost of shipping. Charter fees for the DC3 were £1200. Mr, W. W. Meuser. who came to Cairns to supervise the loading of the shipment, said that Mr. P. Kidd, of Malanda, in North Queensland, would buy a Santa Gertrudis bull to mate with the heifers. The European and native staffs of the mission consume considerable amounts of beef"

On 24 October 1959 the first Lae Agricultural show was run;

In the livestock section, dairy cattle were the strongest exhibit. The cattle came from the Lutheran Mission at Malahang, Mrs. Jensen's dairy, both near Lae and the Department of Agriculture and Stock and Fisheries' (DASF) property Erap

The mission owned 1250 acres of Coconut plantations, produced copra, grew vegetables, raised poultry, cattle and other animals and operated sawmills.

The cattle herd was built up to more than 150 head and a dairy was established. In 1955 Tropical Dairies became the first in PNG to supply pasteurised milk in cartons. By 1961 Malahang was producing some 32000 gallons of milk per year.

== Aircraft ==
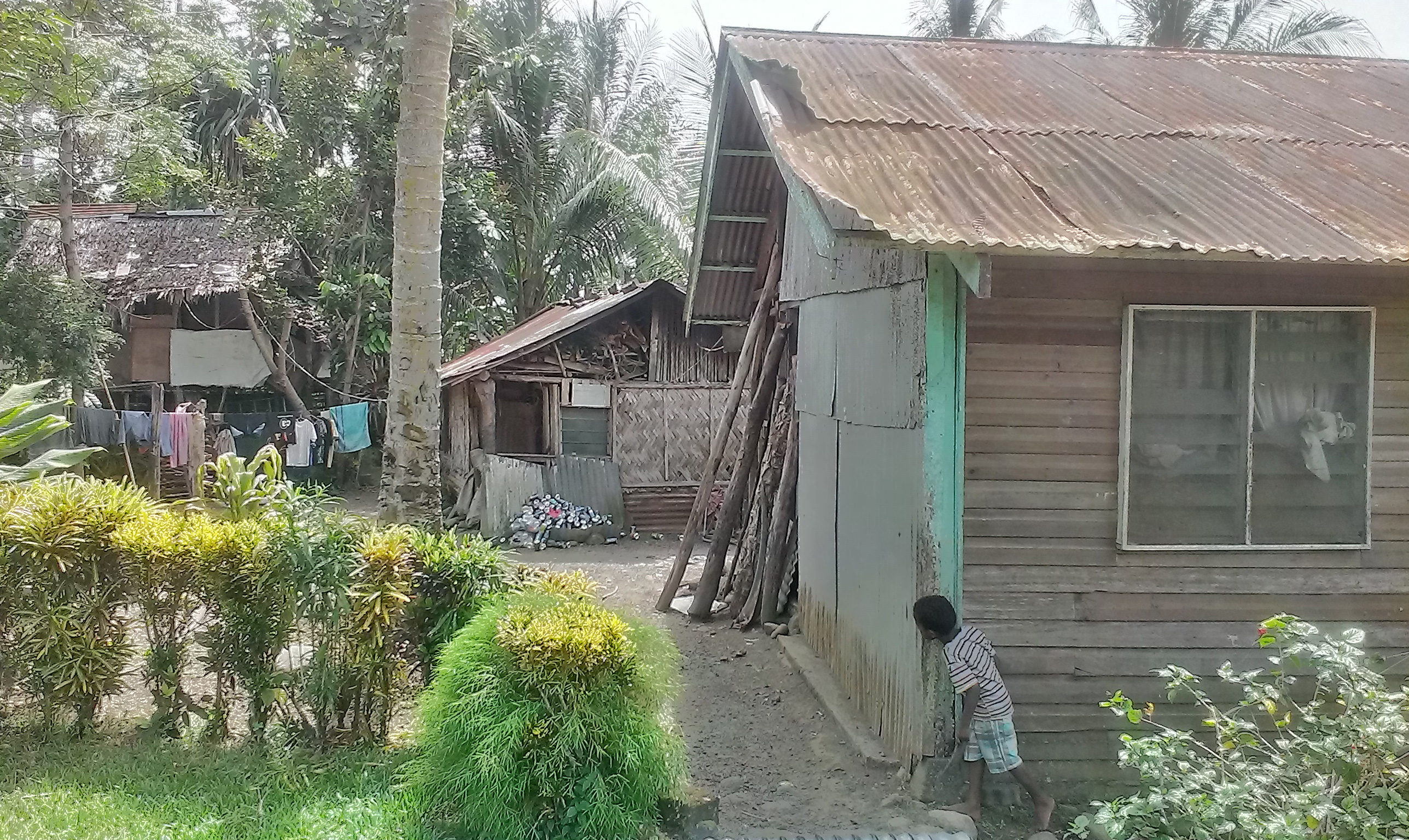
Photo of the missionary houses

The Mission owned and operated a Junkers F.1313ke tri-motor aircraft named "Papua" (VH-UTS). In August 1939, German pilots Werner Garms and Paul Raabe from Malahang took off en route to the Ogelgeng Lutheran Mission station near Mt. Hagen. After learning of the start of World War II in Europe, the two pilots decided to steal the plane and return to Germany. They flew to Merauke Airfield where the Junkers was abandoned, its ultimate fate is unknown. Garms and Raabe made their way by steamer to Japan and then via the Trans-Siberian railway back to Germany, where both joined the Luftwaffe. Garms died over the Crimean front during the German invasion of Russia.
