= Hopoi Mission Station =

Luteran mission in Papua New Guinea

Coordinates: 6°43′56″S 147°21′40″E

The Hopoi Mission Station is a Lutheran filial station situated in Morobe Province in Papua New Guinea now under the auspices of the Evangelical Lutheran Church of Papua New Guinea.

== Location ==
The Hopoi Mission Station is located South of Bukaua, and 41 kilometres (25 mi) East of Lae and 52 kilometres (32 mi) West of Finschhafen on Cape Arkona East of the Bulu River.

Cape Arkona is a conspicuous bluff where the houses of Hopoi Mission Station are located.

A single runway running roughly north to south existed at the time of the mission however no trace exists today.

== History ==
On 4 September, the Australian 9th Division, under Major General George Wootten, landed east of Lae, on "Red Beach" and "Yellow Beach", near Malahang beginning an attempt to encircle Japanese forces in the town. Five U.S. Navy destroyers provided artillery support. The landings were not opposed by land forces but were attacked by Japanese bombers, who killed about 100 Allied naval and army personnel. The 2/13th Battalion (20th Brigade), which had landed at Yellow Beach on the same day as the assault on Red Beach, pushed east, on toward Hopoi Mission West and then to Finschhafen.

The 9th Division faced formidable natural barriers in the form of rivers swollen by recent rain. They came to a halt at the Busu River, which could not be bridged for two reasons: the 9th lacked heavy equipment, and the far bank was occupied by Japanese soldiers. On 9 September, the 2/28th Infantry Battalion led an attack and secured a bridgehead after fierce fighting.

The march from Hopoi Mission to Finschhafen was described as the "greatest march of the new Guinea campaign and in 10 days the battalion had covered 50 miles (80 km) of rugged terrain".

The Mission House at Hopoi served as a headquarters and supply base for the Australian New Guinea Administrative Unit which was led by (NX155085) Captain Ralph Geoffrey Ormsby.

Between 1932 and 1972 the Hopoi mission was used as a Lutheran teacher training school.
