= SS Myoko Maru =

Cargo ship built in 1939

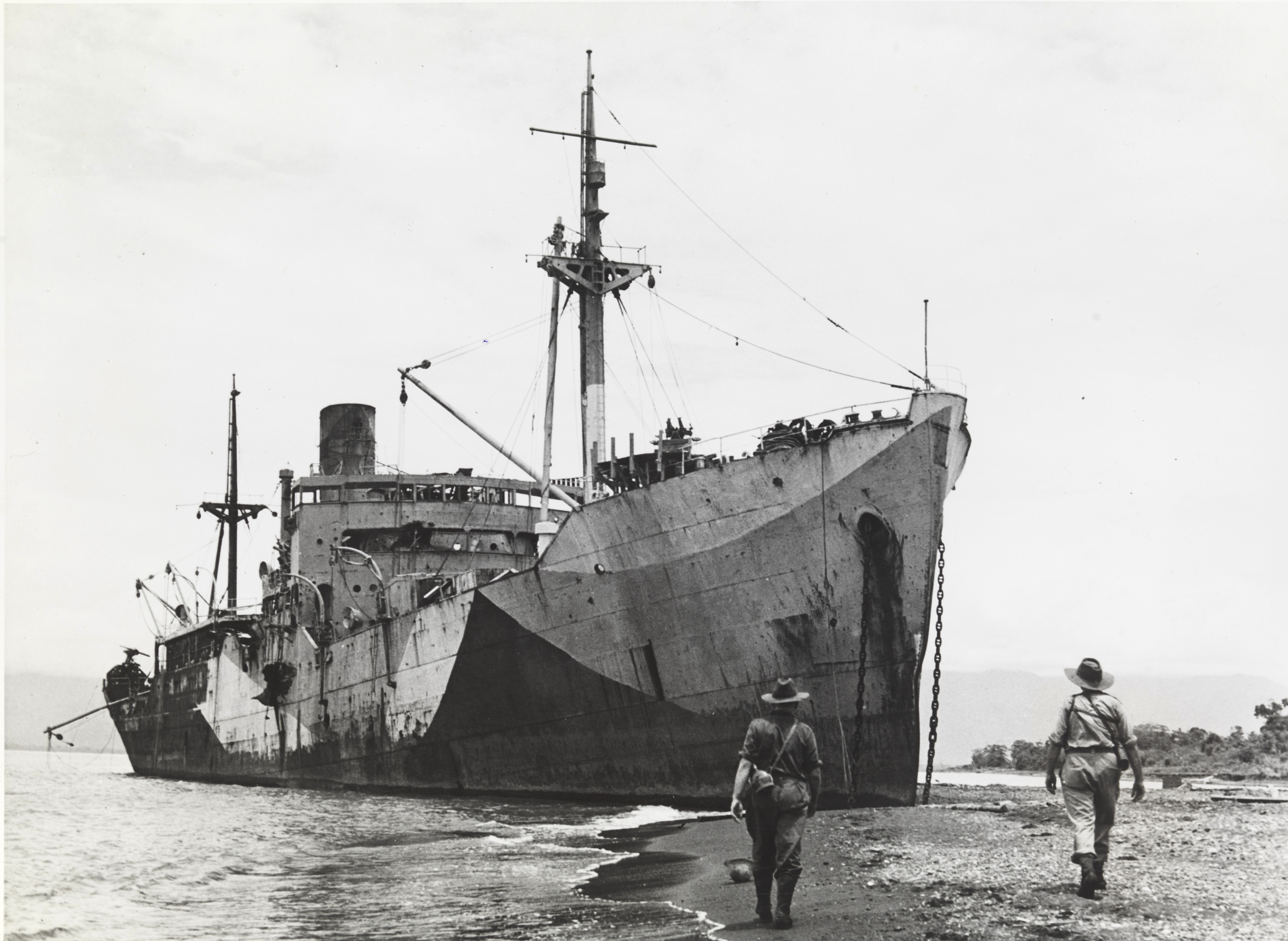
- The wrecked Japanese ship Myoko Maru aground at Malahang in September 1943.

History
- Name: Myoko Maru
- Owner: Nippon Yusen Kabushiki Kaisha (1939); Toa Kaiun Kabushiki Kaisha (1939–1941); Imperial Japanese Army (1941–1943)
- Builder: Mitsubishi Jukogyo Kabushiki Kaisha, Yokohama
- Launched: 1939
- Fate: Driven aground by US aircraft on 7 January 1943.

General characteristics
- Tonnage: 4,103 GRT
- Length: 364.0 feet (111 m)
- Beam: 50.0 feet (15 m)
- Draught: 29.0 feet (9 m)
- Propulsion: Two steam turbines (600 NHP)

The Myoko Maru (Kanji:妙高丸) was a 4,103-gross register ton cargo ship built by Mitsubishi Jukogyo Kabushiki Kaisha, Yokohama for Nippon Yusen Kabushiki Kaisha in 1939. She was transferred to Toa Kaiun Kabushiki Kaisha in 1939, and was requisitioned in 1941 by the Imperial Japanese Army during World War II.

== Fate ==
On 7 January 1943, Myoko Maru was damaged by United States Consolidated B-24 Liberator aircraft of the 49th Fighter Group off Lae, New Guinea, whereupon it was steered up to and ran aground on the beach near Malahang at 06°49'S, 147°04'E. It was bombed again the next day at the same location and destroyed; it became known as the "Malahang wreck". During the war, the ship provided accommodation for thousands of American and Australian troops moving north. After the war, the ship was used by John F. Hoile, an engineer, who turned the hull of the ship into an engineering workshop. By this time, the ship was entirely beached.
