= Lae Airfield =

Closed airport in Lae, Papua New Guinea

Lae Airfield
- Part of Fifth Air Force
- Located in Morobe Province, Papua New Guinea

Site information
- Type: Civilian/Military Airfield
- Controlled by: United States Army Air Forces

Location
- Coordinates: 06°43′59″S 146°59′45″E

Site history
- Built: 1930s (prewar airport)
- In use: 1942–1945

Airfield information
- Identifiers: IATA: LAE (historical), ICAO: AYLA

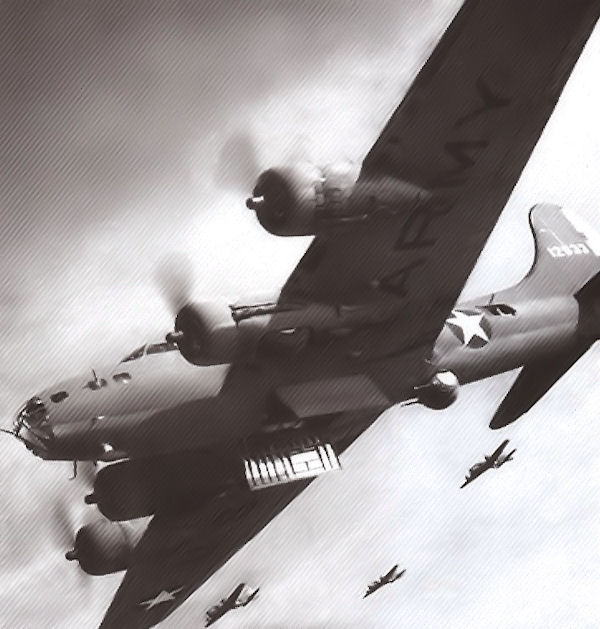
B-17s of the 19th Bombardment Group attacking Japanese-held Lae Airfield, New Guinea on 26–27 June 1942. Boeing B-17E Fortress 41-2633 (Sally) in Foreground. This aircraft was damaged by a storm in April 1945. Afterwards it was flown to Brisbane, Australia for scrapping in May 1945

Lae Airfield is a former World War II airfield and later, civilian airport located at Lae, Morobe Province, Papua New Guinea. The airport was closed in the 1980s, in favour of Lae Nadzab Airport, which was able to accommodate larger jet aircraft. The airport was also known as Lae Drome or Lae Aerodrome.

== History ==
The airport was built in 1927 and was an operating airport until 1987. The airport construction resulted in Lae becoming a major city in Papua New Guinea.

=== Post World War I ===
In 1921 when the military administration ended after World War I, a gold prospector named Cecil John Levien was appointed District Officer of Morobe. On 1 January 1923 Levien acquired a mining right for the area and shortly after formed a syndicate called Guinea Gold (No Liability).

In November 1927 the Guinea Gold syndicate became Guinea Airways Limited and Levien arranged for the construction of the airstrip to assist the gold mine productions around Wau.

=== World War II ===
In February 1942 Nadzab was a mission station with a small landing strip which was quickly neglected when war broke out. It was never used by the Japanese. During Japanese occupation they upgraded the nearby Malahang runway to be used as a satellite of Lae Airfield.

In September 1943 the Nadzab mission was invaded by US paratroopers dropping from 96 C-47s. Reconstruction of the airstrip began immediately. Overhead some 250 bombers and fighters provided cover by bombing Japanese troop positions and fuel depots. Next day elements of the 7th Australian Division were flown in to attack Lae from the north whilst the 9th Australian Division landed to the east by sea to move on Lae in a pincer movement. The 503rd Bomber Group historian wrote:

"Bombing was excellent. The mission was uneventful".

Lyndon B. Johnson was appointed Lieutenant Commander in the United States Naval Reserve on 21 June 1940. Eleven Martin B-26 Marauders of the 22nd Bombardment Group departed Townsville on 8 June 1942, arrived in Port Moresby and raided Lae on 9 June 1942. The mission was called "TOW 9" and Lieutenant Commander Lyndon Baines Johnson, the future 36th President of the United States, went on this raid as an observer on the aircraft, the Heckling Hare. (Note: The aircraft the Heckling Hare (#40-1488) was probably named after the cartoon The Heckling Hare) (Note: The aircraft was also known as the Arkansas Traveller) Nine days after the raid, Johnson was awarded a Silver Star medal for his participation in the above bombing raid. in

=== Post WW2 ===
The airstrip recovered to become a significant factor in the development of post-war PNG

=== Decommission ===
The old Lae airfield started losing its thunder in 1977 when Lae Nadzab Airport, a former wartime United States Air Force base, became operational. Fierce political squabbling over the pros and cons of Lae and Nadzab continued until 1982, when, in an unsolved mystery, the Lae airport terminal was burned down.

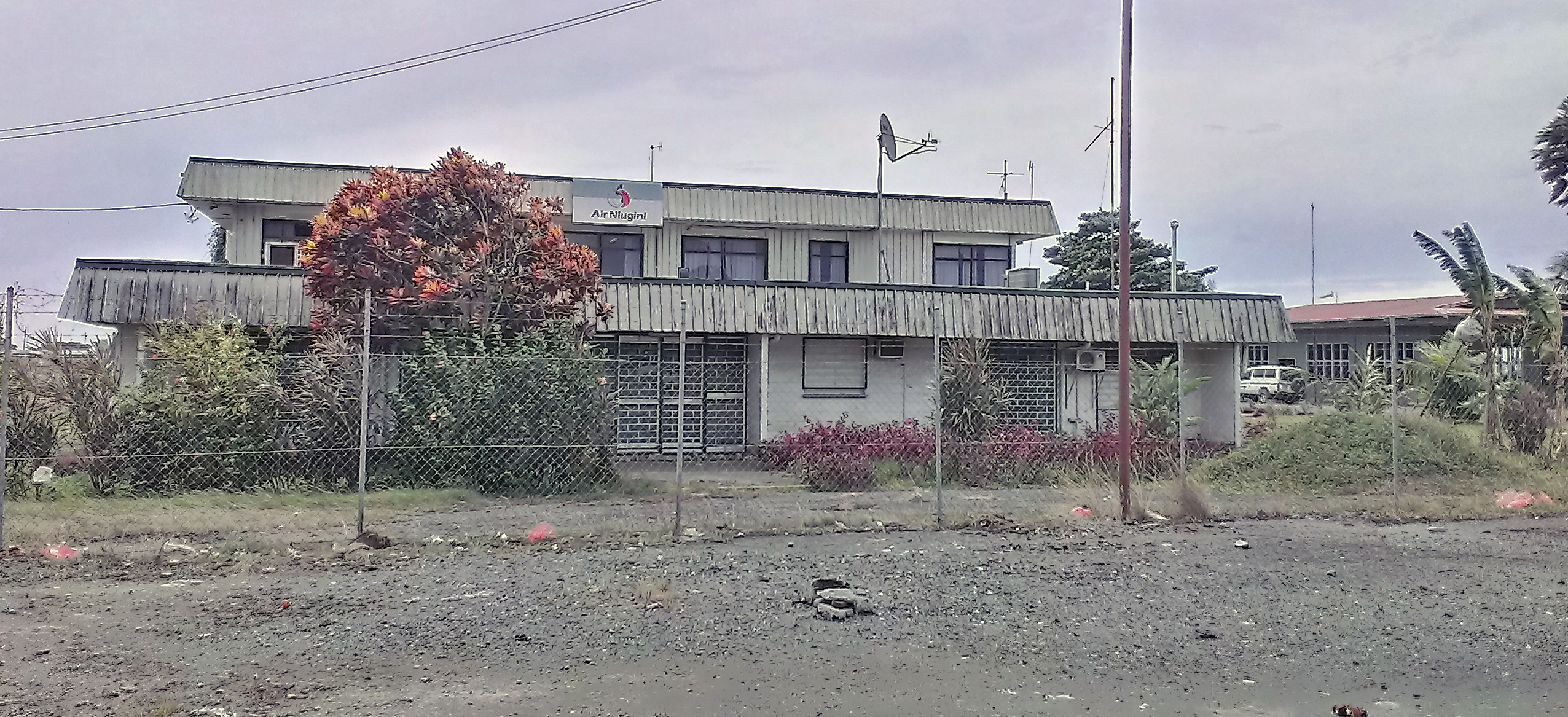
Photo of original Air Niugini terminal at old Lae airfield. Taken 29 January 2014

Lae airfield continued to be used by Air Niugini and by third-level airlines until 1987. It was also used as the base for the Papua New Guinea Defence Force until it was transferred to Port Moresby in 1992.

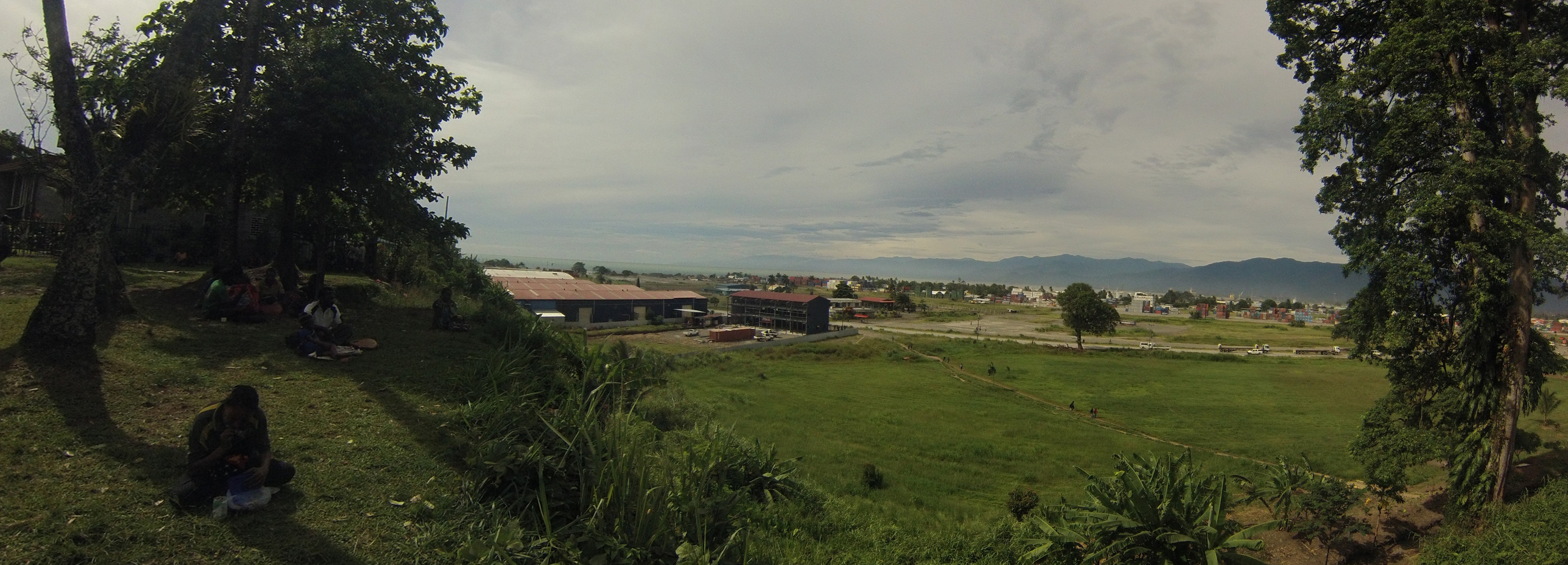
Photo overlooking the old Lae airfield from "Top Town" – Lae CBD. At the bottom of the photo is the Amelia Earhart memorial. Photo taken 29 January 2014

== First flight ==
The first flight into the airfield was a DH-37 flown by E. A. "Pard" Mustar. The aircraft was shipped from Essendon Airport to Rabaul on the S.S. Melusia and flown to Lae on 31 March 1927.

From 1922 to 1942 the airfield was part of a massive airlift operation to service the Bulolo goldfields and was one of the largest airlift operations in the world. Junkers W34 planes were ideal and the German Junkers aeroplanes played a major part in the exploration and development of what is today Papua New Guinea. To mine the gold required the construction on site of several 1500+ ton dredges with the heaviest part scaling over 3 tons.

== Junkers W34 aircraft ==
The first Junkers W34 B, VH-UGZ (c/n 2601 CoR 195-crashed Wau 6 March 1930), was bought disassembled in big crates to New Guinea and made its test flight on 10 April 1928. The first two G31s were called Peter and Paul, the third simply G31. This aircraft could carry two passengers and a ton of freight in the cargo compartment. In the first 19 days of operation the W34 No 1 earned gross revenue of £2,649 with field costs of £360. The second W34 was ordered on 8 June 1928 and arrived in December. By then No 1 W34 had carried 500 passengers and 300 tons of freight. Guinea Airways eventually purchased five of these simple, rugged and honest Junkers machines unmatched at the time by any other manufacturer. The aircraft could be loaded or unloaded in 15 minutes through a large open hatch on the roof with the gantry crane above the aircraft.

== Amelia Earhart ==
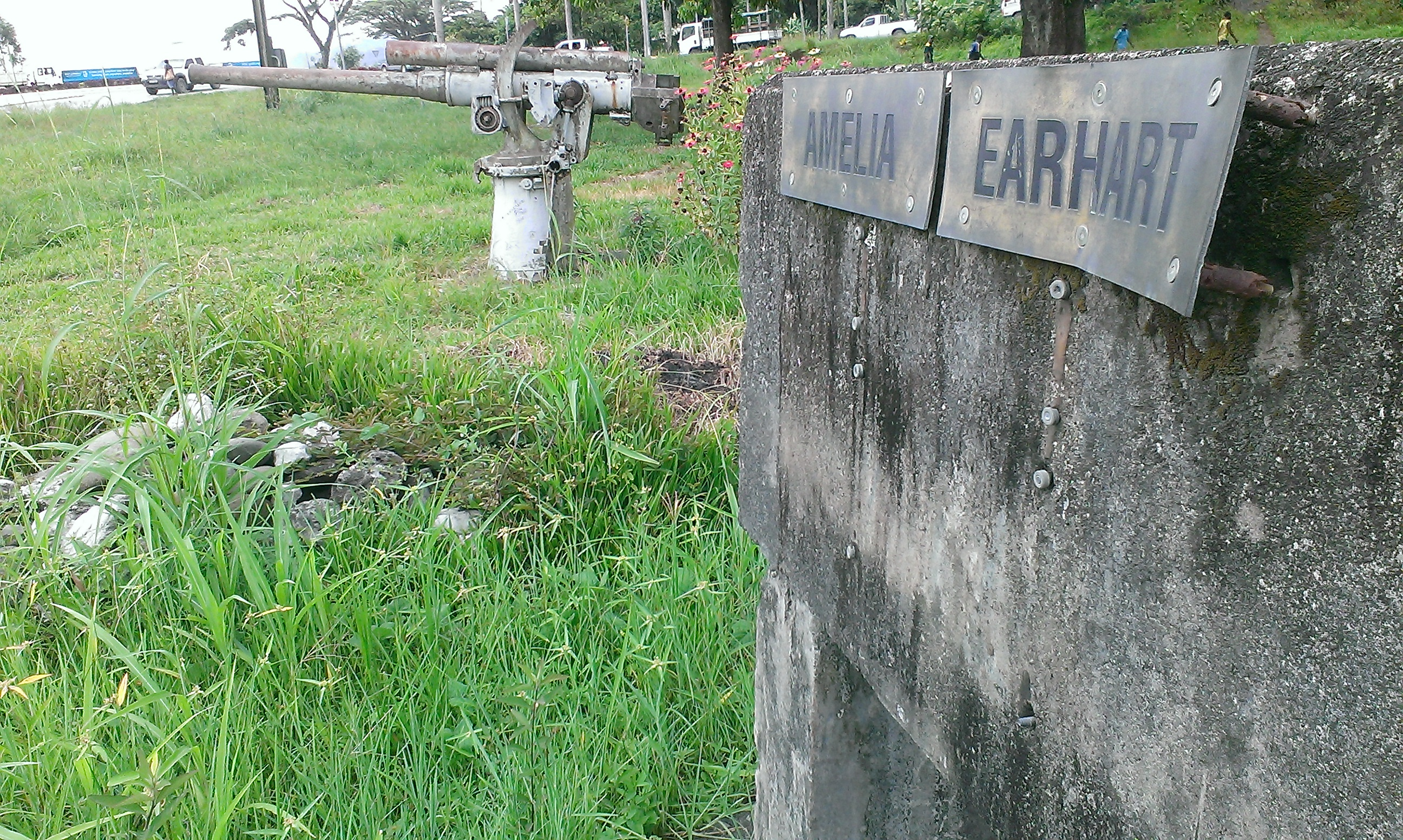
Amelia Earhart monument situated near old airfield. Note the Japanese anti-aircraft gun. Bronze plaque since stolen. Photo taken 7 January 2014

The Lae airport is probably best remembered for being the point of departure in July 1937 for Amelia Earhart and navigator Fred Noonan on their flight to Howland Island. Earhart's plane disappeared near Howland Island some 19 hours after departing Lae airport.

=== Allied Units based at Lae Airfield ===
- Headquarters, 309th Bombardment Wing (1 February – 3 March 1944) B-24 Liberator

== Former Airlines ==
Airlines that used Lae airfield included:

- Bulolo Goldfields Air Service
- Guinea Airways
- Morlae Airlines (Port Moresby)
- Ansett Airways
- Trans Australia Airlines
- Air Niugini
- Qantas
- Talair

== See also ==
- USAAF in the Southwest Pacific
