= Malahang =

- Suburb
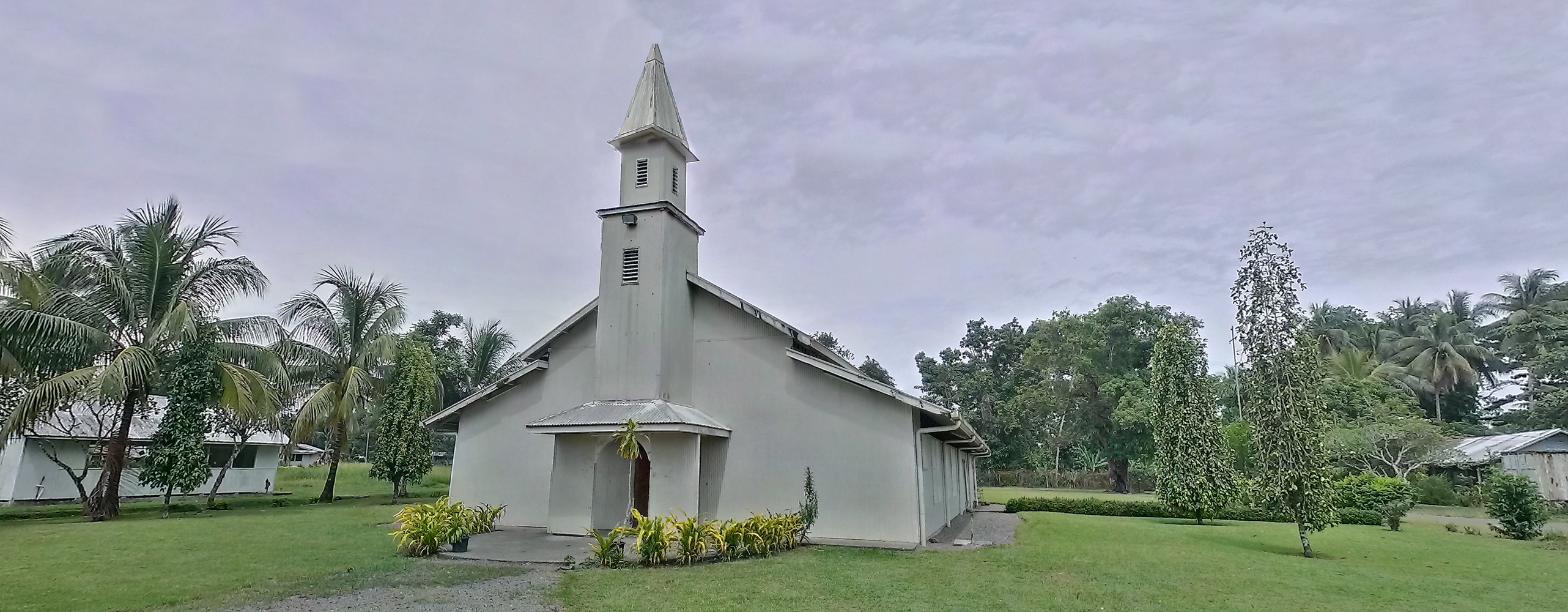
- Panoramic photo St Andrews Lutheran Church, Evangelical Lutheran Church of Papua New Guinea Headquarters- Ampo

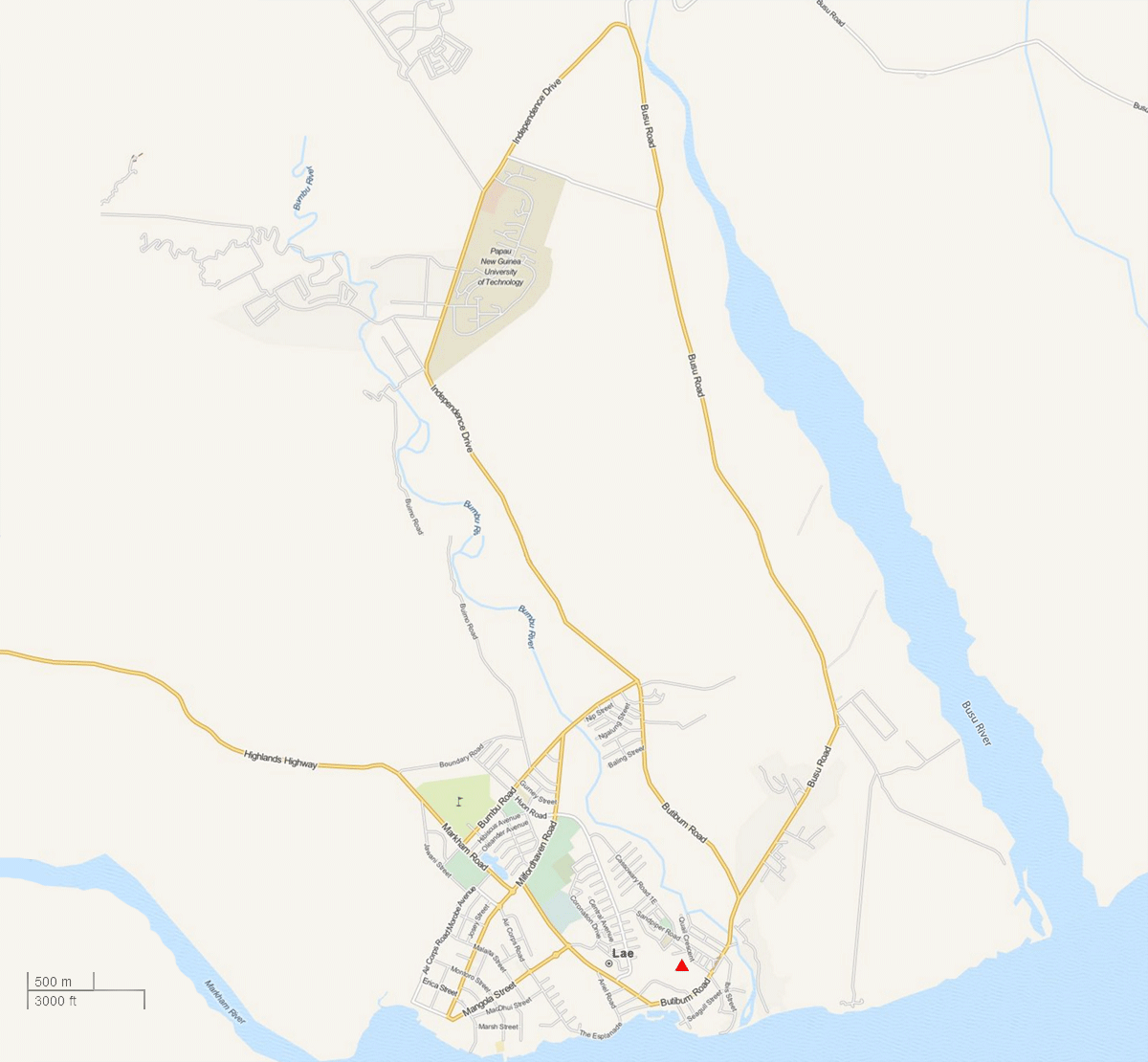
- Location in Lae
- Coordinates: 6°43′10″S 147°0′30″E
- Country: Papua New Guinea
- Province: Morobe Province
- District: Lae District
- Time zone: UTC+10 (AEST)

Malahang is a suburb of Lae, Morobe Province in Papua New Guinea.

== Location ==
Malahang is located North East of Lae, Morobe Province, Papua New Guinea on Busu Road across the Bumbu River.

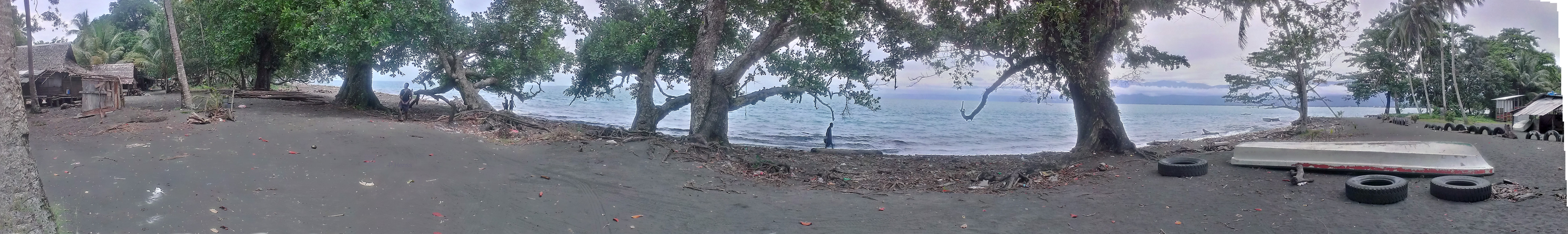
Panoramic photo of Malahang beach. To the right is the remains of SS Myoko Maru (1939) a Japanese cargo ship. To the left is one of the Malahang community houses.

== History ==
In the late 1800s the German New Guinea Company arrived on Neu Guinea (German New Guinea), to select land for plantation development on the north-east coast of New Guinea and establish trading posts.

The Lutheran Malahang Mission Station was established around the same time as the various coconut plantations located opposite the Malahang Industrial Area.

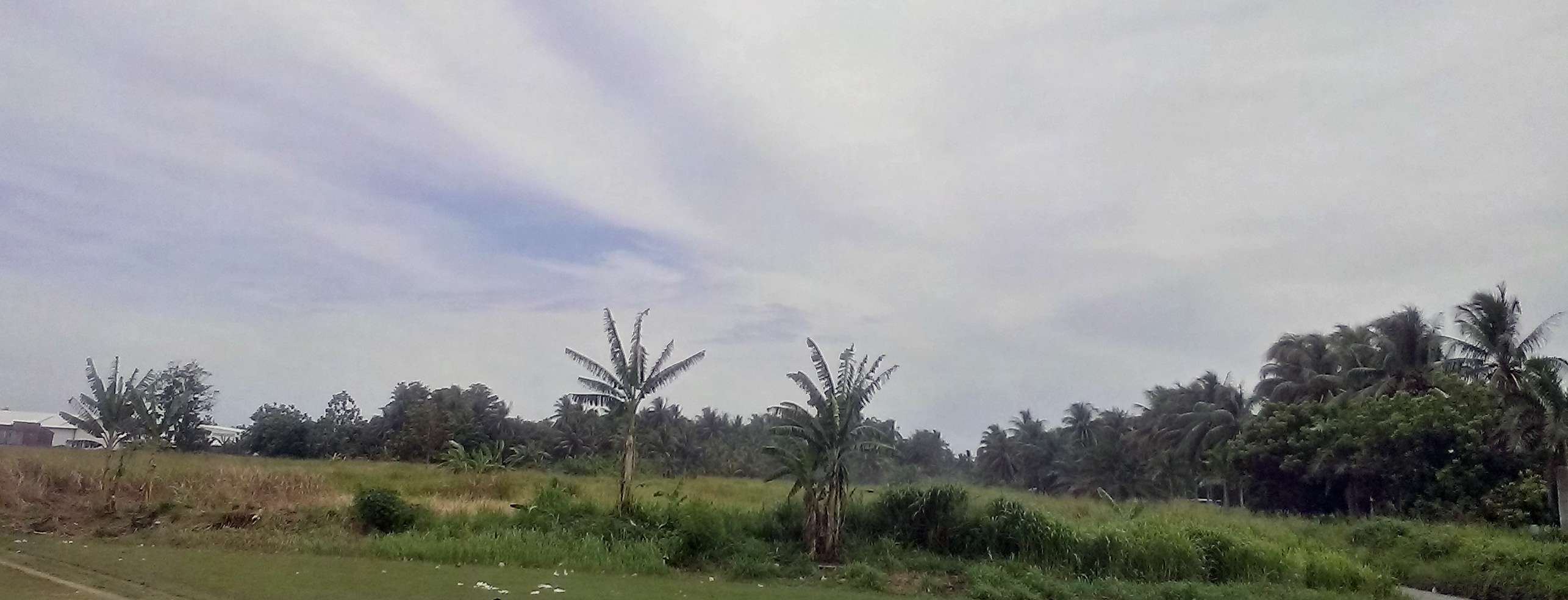
Area around the old Malahang airstrip facing South East. The rebuilt Japanese runway was located to the left side of the photo where the Malahang Industrial estate is located

On 8 March 1942 the Imperial Japanese landed at Malahang Beach as part of the Invasion of Lae-Salamaua during World War II. Malahang airfield was upgraded by the Japanese so the runway was 800 feet (240 m) long by 50 feet (15 m) wide and used as satellite of Lae Airport.

On 8 January 1943, the cargo ship Myoko Maru was damaged by an aerial attack by United States Army Air Forces aircraft during the Battle of Wau, and was subsequently beached and abandoned at Malahang Beach.

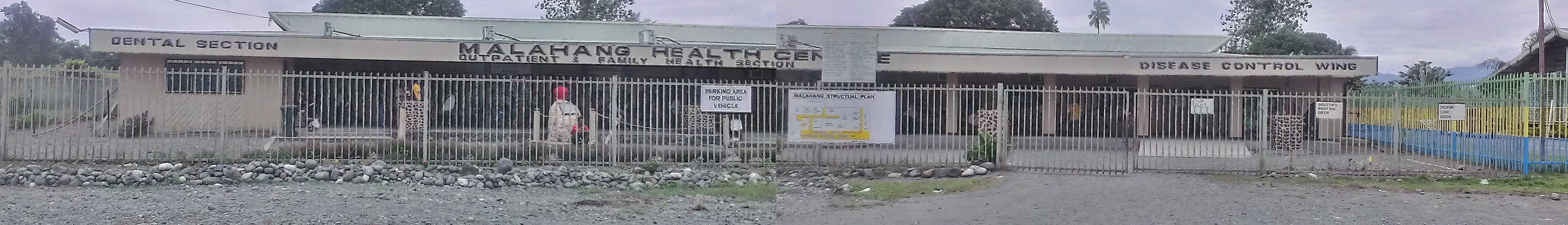
Malahang health complex, Possible location of Malahang Hospital

The area was liberated by the Australian 9th Division on 14 September 1943. The airfield was subsequently abandoned.

In September 1943, the 2nd Australian Corps Signals (AIF)relieved Signals 1 Australian Corps. In Australians At War, Signalman John Tesoriero writes;

"In September 1943, the unit moved to Lae, boarding their ships at Buna. While we collapsed absolutely exhausted onto the pebbles, a line of vehicles arrived out of the darkness. They were field ambulances carrying wounded men from the 9th Division assault on Lae just a matter of days ago. They were loaded onto one of the LSTs. We slept where we fell. Not even the light shower which fell onto our faces before dawn made any difference. We were a little north of the Lae township, at Malahang Beach. Just inland, overlooking the beach, we made out a big hill blasted by aerial bombing, which they said was honeycombed with caves containing Japanese supplies, big guns pointed out to sea, and a number of enemy troops. The effective bombing had sealed up many enemy in its shattered mess."

During WW2, No. 41 Wing RAAF relocated the 332 radar station from Port Moresby to Lae and to the airfield. Sgt. Bill Humphries who provided the following account of the installation;

"We arrived at Lae two days after it was taken and found the place devastated and the stench nauseating. Open tunnels in the scarp were a mute reminder of where many Japanese chose to be entombed rather than surrender. The Americans moved in, sealed off the tunnels and generally cleared up the area. Australians were setting up a cemetery and we were able to service their technical equipment when required. The station was erected on top of the scarp, all gear being manhandled up".
"After six weeks operation a decision was made to move the station to the vicinity of the unused airstrip at Malahang where lack of local knowledge led to a disaster. The camp and radar were set up on a grassy plain which belied the fact that during the wet season it became a racing waterway. When the wet season arrived the camp was washed out".

In 1992 the Veterans' Review Board (Australia) (Note: see Mackey and Repatriation Commission [2001] AATA 742, Administrative Appeals Tribunal (Australia)) heard evidence where the applicant stated;

"I recall that on one occasion I had to visit Lae, on the north coast of New Guinea. Lae had just been recaptured from the Japanese. I had gone there to pay personnel. I recall that the odour of death was everywhere. The destruction was also horrific. I can still smell that odour to this day".

== Malahang Airfield ==
The Malahang airfield was built by Martin Boerner to service the Malahang Mission. Boerner was manager of the Lutheran Mission Aviation Department between(1931-1940). The airfield was 3250 ft long with an excellent surface and the road to Pastor Schmutterer station at Ampo, which allowed Vacuum Oil trucks to carry fuel to the airstrip. As a result of the Japanese occupation the airfield served as a satellite airfield to the Lae Airfield.

== Malahang Gaol ==
The Malahang Gaol in Malahang is where many prisoners were hanged.

== Evangelical Lutheran Church of Papua New Guinea ==
The Evangelical Lutheran Church of Papua New Guinea Headquarters, St. Andrews Lutheran Church, Balob Teachers College (Butibam) and other Lutheran establishments are located at Malahang.

Following a dispute with the German New Guinea Company, Pastor Gottfried Schmutterer from the Neuendettelsau Mission Society was forced to relocate his original mission camp in July 1912 and was offered a location on the banks of the Bumbu known as Ampo. Several Lutheran churches, schools and headquarter buildings now occupy the surrounds. The Ampo Lutheran Churchmbuilt in 1937 and later used as a WW2 field hospital, is the oldest building in Lae.

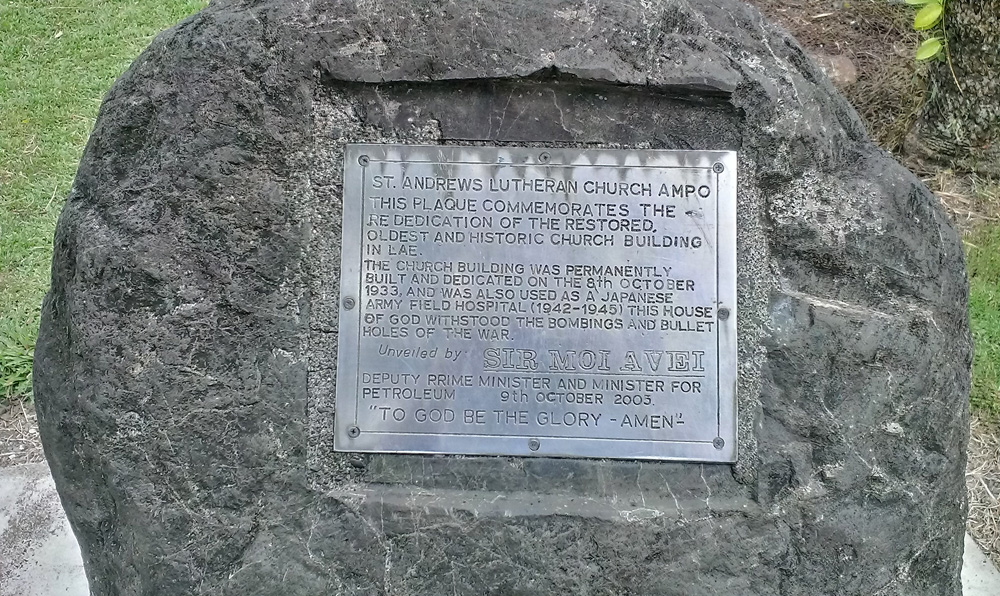
St Andrews Lutheran Church, Evangelical Lutheran Church of Papua New Guinea Headquarters- Ampo. Plaque on stone.

== Malahang Hospital ==
After WW2 a hospital was set up, known as the Malahang Native Hospital. Following the Lae volcano eruption in January 1951, as a result of the Red Cross in Brisbane supplying blood, 30 lives were saved out of 4000 eruption casualties.

In the 1970s Victor Barnes worked at the Malahang Hospital under the direction of Dr Neville Henry and practiced hypnosis in place of General anaesthesia. In the Australian Journal of Clinical and Experimental Hypnosis he claims;

I first gave a demonstration of hypnosis to Dr Henry, using a house servant as the subject . He was impressed and suggested that we try hypnotic for the removal of tuberculous lymph glands . A ward full of patients requiring this operation had accumulated and we decided to operate on them the following day . The hypnotic anaesthesia worked spectacularly well in each case.

== Schools ==
- Malahang Technical High School

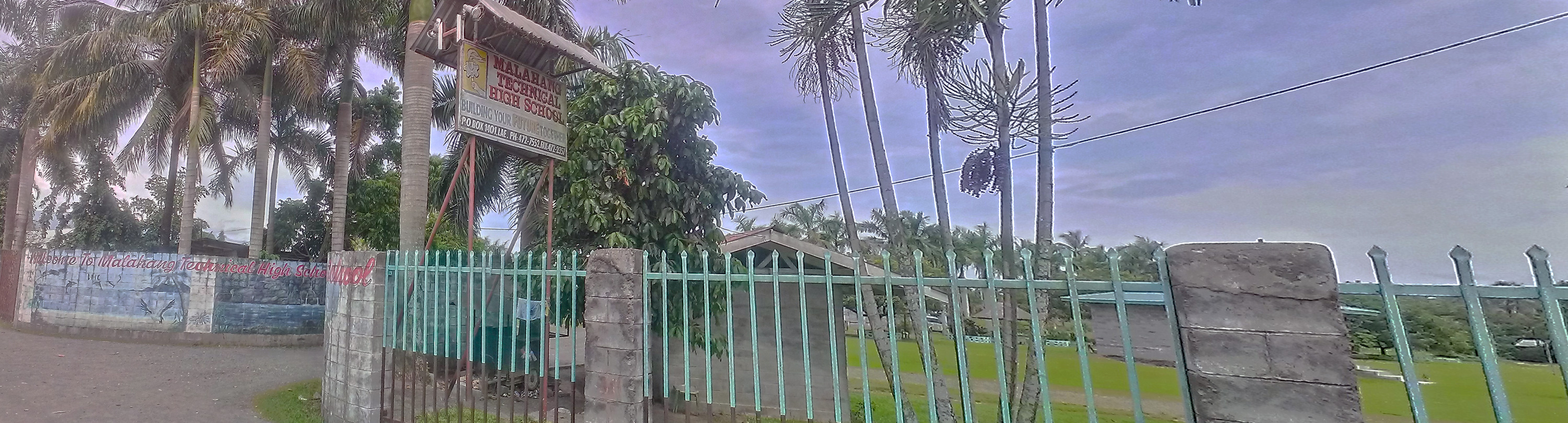
Front gate to Malahang Technical High school, Busu Rd, Malahang.

== Industry ==
An industrial area is constructed in the area with a K85 million (US$38 million) tuna processing facility operated by Majestic Seafood Ltd.

== Notable people ==
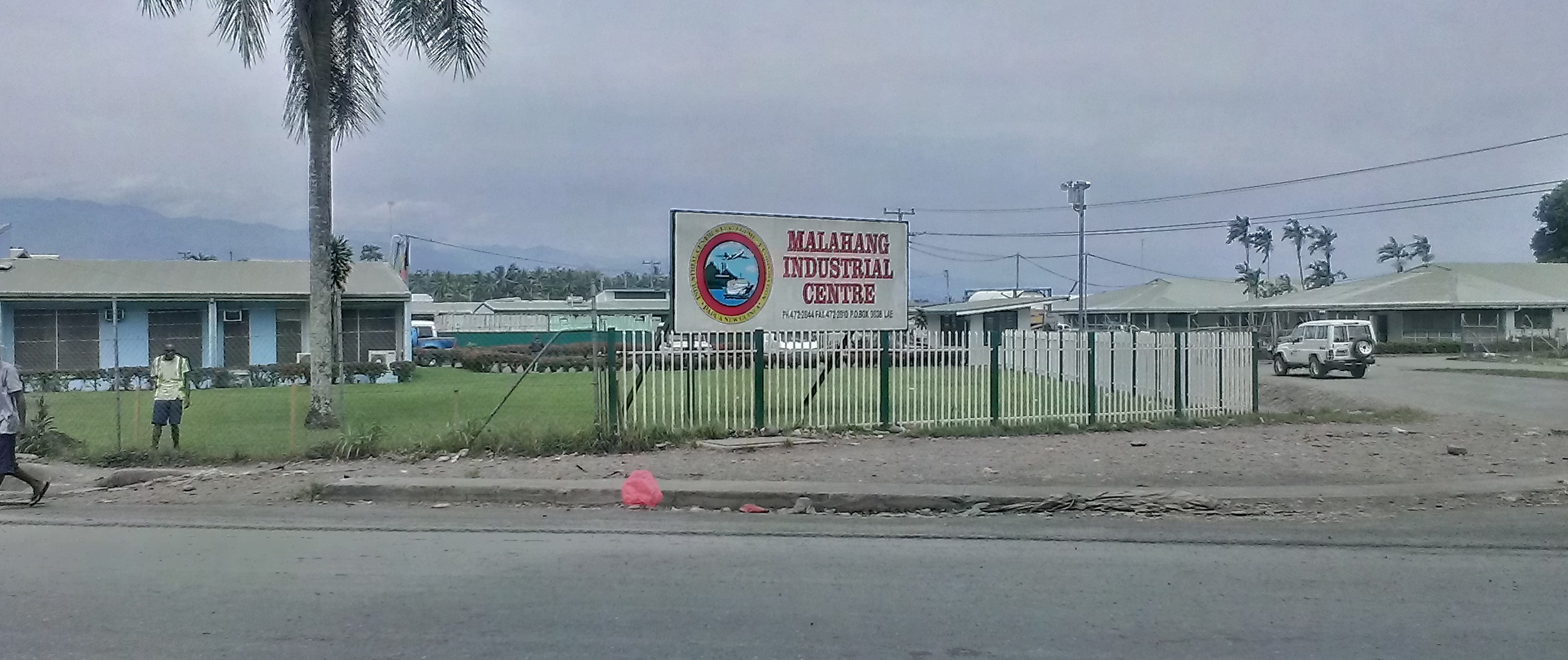
Malahang Industrial Area, Lae, Morobe Province

In 1953 and 1954, Professor Ian Maddocks AM, born 29 December 1931, was a medical student at the Malahang Hospital and later became a specialised physician in Papua New Guinea for 14 years.

In 1971 he became Foundation Dean of the Faculty of Medicine at the University of Papua New Guinea and was also editor of the Papua New Guinea Medical Journal.

In 2013 Professor Maddocks was named Senior Australian of the Year.
