= German New Guinea Company =

1882–1899 German chartered company

Flag of the German New Guinea Company (1885–1899).

The German New Guinea Company (German: Deutsche Neuguinea-Kompagnie) was a German Chartered Company which exploited insular territory in and near present Papua New Guinea.

== History ==
In the 1870s and 1880s German commercial firms began to site trading stations in New Guinea. Agents of J.C. Godeffroy & Sohn reached the Bismarck Archipelago from the Caroline Islands in 1872. In 1875, Hersheim & Company moved to the Archipelago.

In 1884, the New Guinea Company was founded in Berlin by Adolph von Hansemann and a syndicate of German bankers for the purpose of colonizing and exploiting resources on Neuguinea (German New Guinea), where German interest grew after British Queensland's annexation of part of eastern New Guinea. This expedition was with the knowledge and blessing of the German Chancellor, Count Otto von Bismarck, and with secrecy and speed an expedition was fitted out under Dr Otto Finsch, ornithologist and explorer.

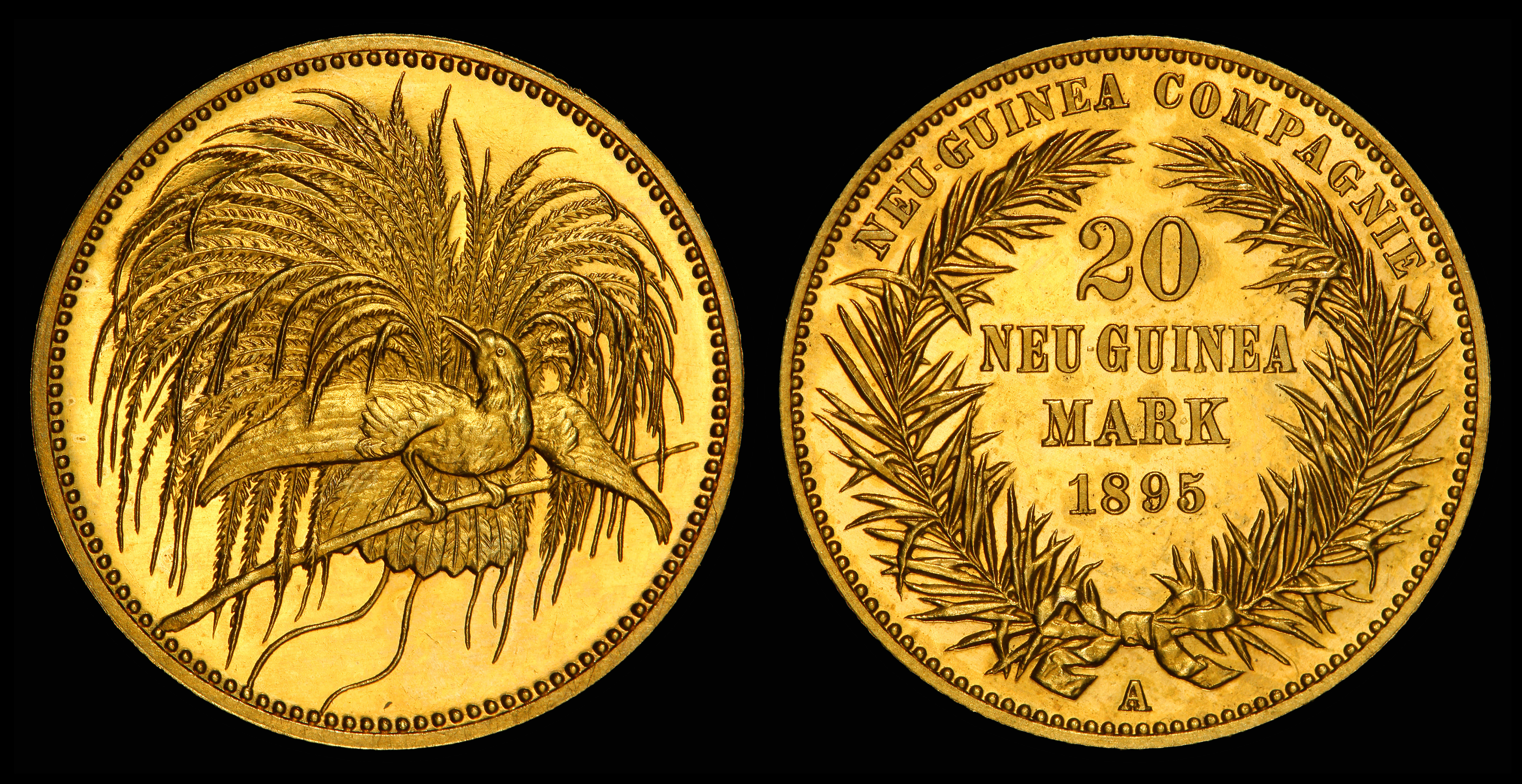
1895 20 Mark gold coin issued by the German New Guinea Company for use in German New Guinea.

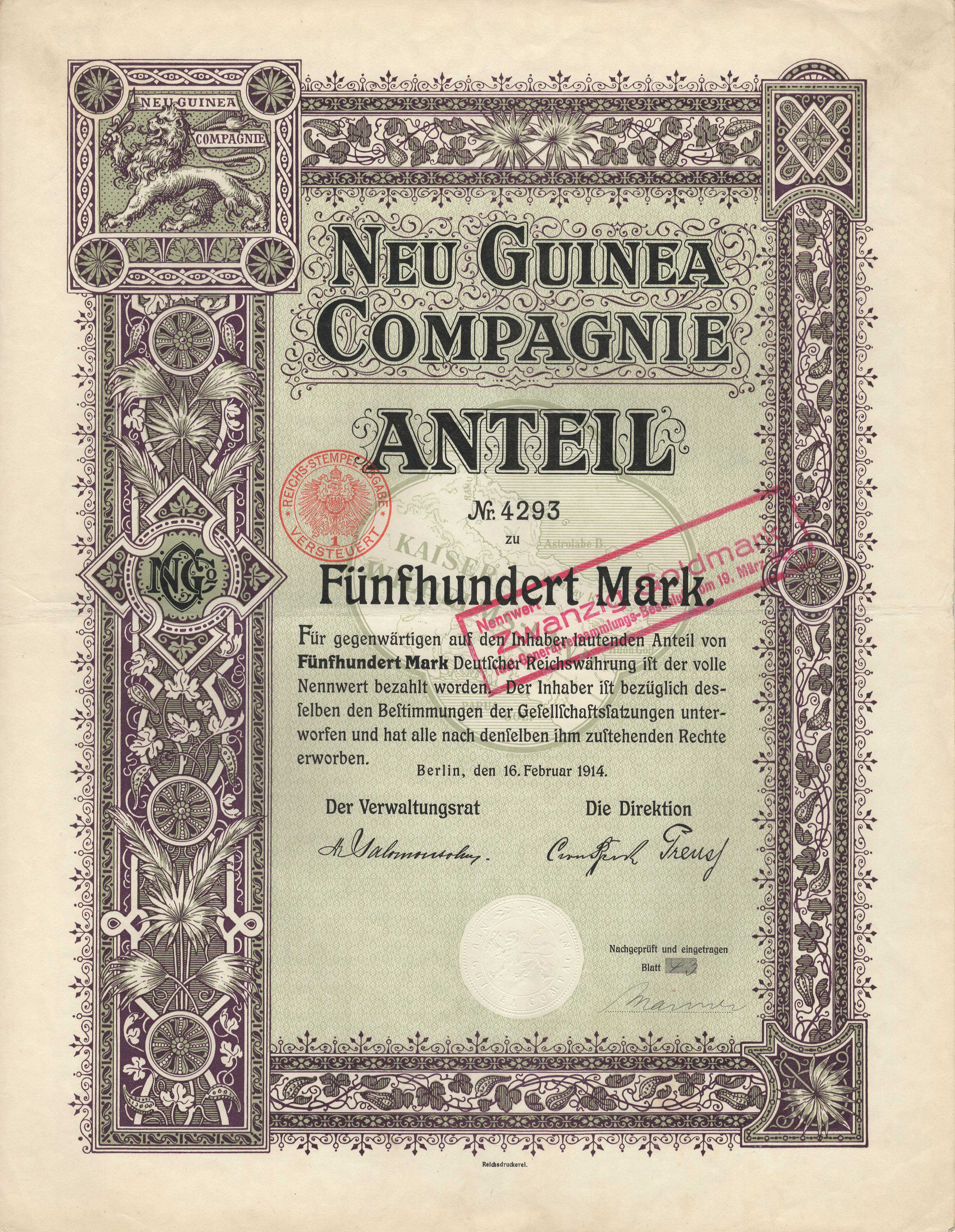
Share of the Neuguinea Compagnie, issued 16 February 1914

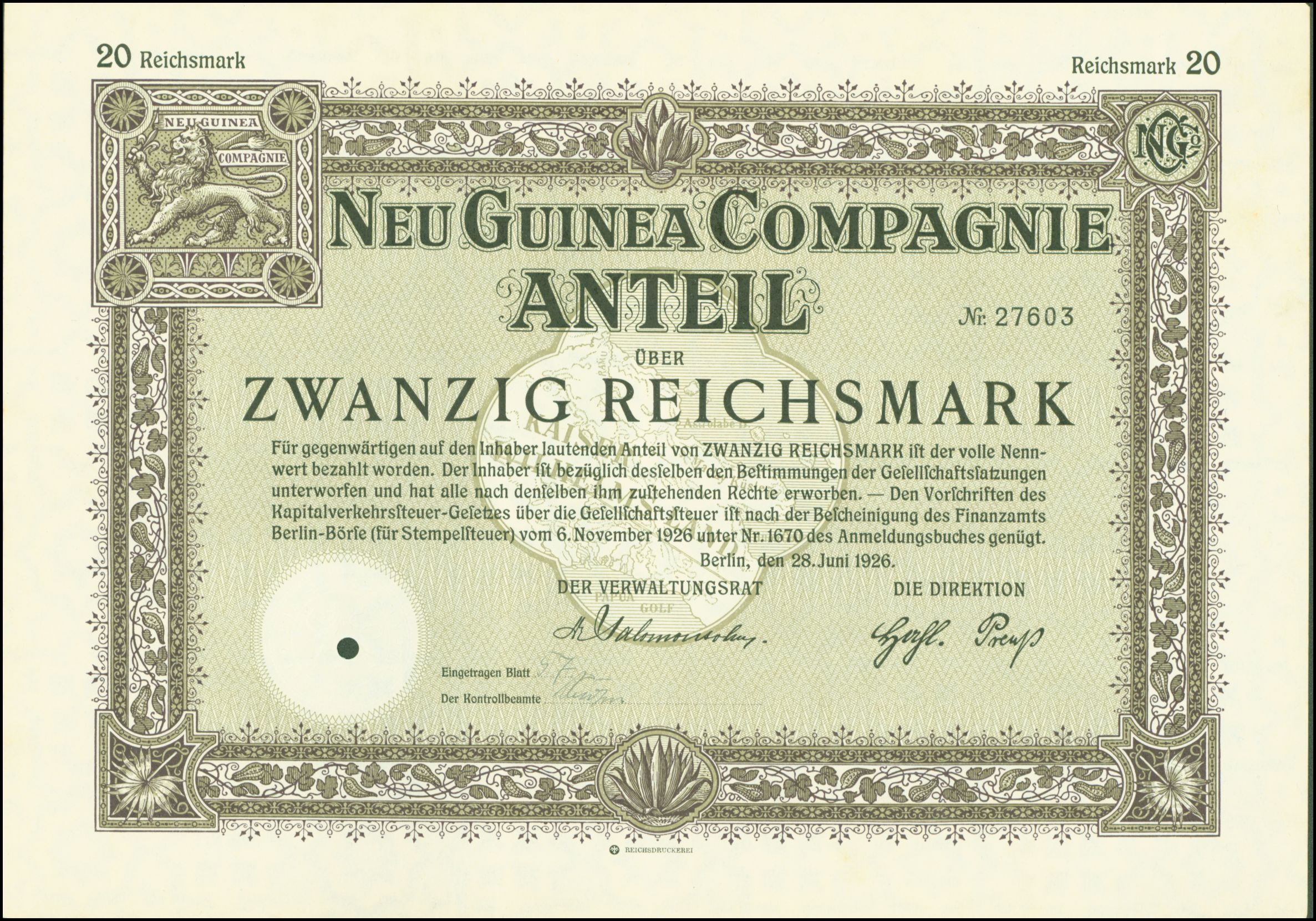
Share of the Neuguinea Compagnie, issued 28 June 1926

His task was to select land for plantation development on the north-east coast of New Guinea and establish trading posts. Its influence soon grew to encompass the entire north-eastern part of New Guinea and some of the islands off the coast.

The Neuguinea Compagnie expedition left Sydney for New Guinea in the steamer Samoa captained by Eduard Dallmann. On 19 August, Chancellor Bismarck ordered the establishment of a German protectorate in the New Britain Archipelago and north-eastern New Guinea.

German colonial rule in New Guinea lasted for a period of thirty years, For the first fifteen years the colony was administered under imperial charters by a private company, in the manner of the old British East India Company and Dutch East India Company, but with far less success. From 1899 to 1914, the Imperial Government administered German New Guinea through a governor, who was assisted after 1904 by a nominated Government Council. When the Imperial Government took over the running of the colony, its overriding objective was rapid economic development based on a German-controlled plantation economy.

== Sources ==
- WorldStatesmen – Papua New Guinea
