= Leslie Boseto =

Solomon Islands politician (born 1933)

Reverend Sir Leslie Boseto KBE (born April 17, 1933), is a retired clergyman and politician.

On 23 March 1969, he became the first UCPNGSI Bishop at a ceremony at Gizo.

He was a member of the National Parliament of the Solomon Islands, from 1997 to 2010.

He was awarded an Honorary Doctorate by the Pasifika Communities University in 2025.

== Personal life ==
He married Hazel Pitavavini in 1961.

He lives on the island of Choiseul.

== See also ==
- Politics of the Solomon Islands
