= Postage stamps and postal history of Papua New Guinea =

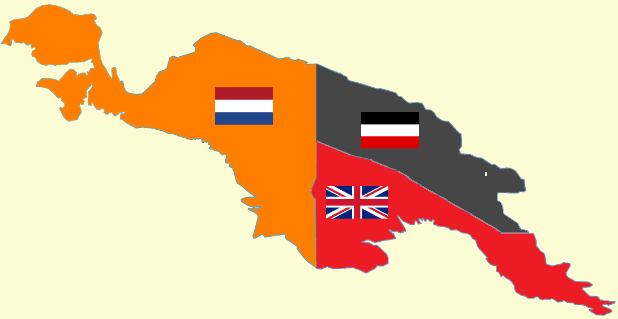
Colonial division of the island of New Guinea, before 1914: in the West, the Dutch part; in the North-East, the German part (pictured here without the Bismarck Archipelago); and in the South-East, the British one renamed Papua by the Australian government

The postage stamps and postal history of Papua New Guinea originated in the two colonial administrations on the eastern part of the island of New Guinea and continued until their eventual merger, followed by independence in 1975.

In the South, Papua, formally under British rule, used the stamps of Queensland between 1885 and 1901. With the creation of the Commonwealth of Australia, the philatelic production and postal organisation were transferred to Australia and the stamps printed in Brisbane, then Melbourne.

In the North, New Guinea was under the control of the German Empire and used its stamps between 1888 and 1897. The colony got stamps bearing its name after 1897. Consequently, to the Australian occupation in 1914, the remaining German colonial stamps and some Australian ones, were overprinted. After the Territory of New Guinea became a League of Nations mandate entrusted to Australia, this country organised the postal system and philatelic production in New Guinea.

After the Japanese occupation of New Guinea and the suppression of civil administration in Papua at the beginning of 1942, the stamps of Australia were used between 1945 and 1953, before the two united territories got their own stamps. Progressively, it obtained its philatelic and postal autonomy, and finally independence in September 1975.

Note: concerning the western part of the island of New Guinea or Irian Barat, see Postage stamps of Western New Guinea.

== In the North, New Guinea ==
=== German colony ===
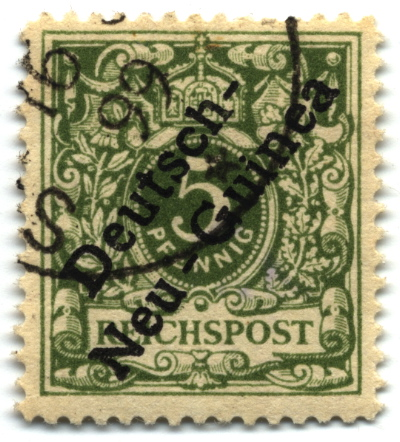
Stamp of Germany overprinted for use in New Guinea, issued in 1897

In German New Guinea, in the Bismarck Archipelago and the North Solomon Islands, the first German post offices opened in 1888 and used some stamps of the German Reich, issued between 1875 and 1887 (denomination in an oval or imperial eagle series). On the mail, they were cancelled with a round datestamp bearing the name of the town in the upper part and a five arm star in the lower. The "DEUTSCH- / NEU-GUINEA" mention appeared in the middle of datestamps some years after, and there can be two or three stars.

In 1897 and 1898, six stamps of Germany were overprinted with the name of the colony, printed in diagonal on two lines. It is in 1901 that the first stamps were issued with the name of the colony printed on them, in the German colonial series, picturing the imperial yacht Hohenzollern.

=== Australian occupation ===
In September 1914, at the beginning of World War I in Europe, Australian troops invaded German New Guinea. In October and December 1914, the remaining stocks of German colonial stamps were overprinted with two legends. On the upper line, "G.R.I." for Georgius Rex Imperator in honour of George V, King of the United Kingdom and Emperor of India. The lower line carried the new denomination expressed in Australian currency: pence ("d.") and shillings ("s.").

A stock of the German Marshall Islands stamps was retrieved in Nauru, while the German postal authority were ordered to destroy it. It was sent to New Guinea, where it was overprinted in the same fashion as German New Guinea stamps and sold starting December 1914.

From January 1915 to 1925, stamps of Australia were used in New Guinea and Nauru, overprinted "NORTH WEST PACIFIC ISLANDS". These were the Kangaroo and Map series and the George V series.

=== Australian mandate ===
On 23 January 1925, the Australian administration under the League of Nations mandate of the Territory of New Guinea issued the first stamp series for this entity, picturing an indigenous village formed by huts. In June 1931, with the first transportation of mail by plane, a part of the Hut stamps was overprinted with an aeroplane and the "AIR MAIL" mention.

On 2 August 1931, a new series replaced the Hut design with a raggiana bird-of-paradise and the "1921 / 1931" dates commemorating the tenth anniversary of the Australian mandate. The same day, the airmail overprinted series went on sale. The 30 June 1932, these stamps were issued again, their design being modified to erase the previous commemorative dates. A new design picturing an aeroplane above the Bulolo River (a gold dredging field since 1932) was created for two high value stamps of two and five Australian pounds respectively. They were issued on 1 May 1935.

British Royal events triggered two issues, simultaneously with the Territories of Nauru and Papua. In May 1935, the one and two pence stamped of the Raggiana Bird of Paradise stamps were overprinted as commemoratives for King George V's Silver Jubilee. However, it was the whole design that was common for the three territories in 1936 to mark the Coronation of King George VI. Four New Guinea stamps were issued with his profile photographed by Bertram Park and engraved by Frank Manley.

On 1 March 1939, a new "AIRMAIL POSTAGE" series was issued with the Bulolo gold field design of 1935.

With the Japanese attack on Rabaul in New Britain in January 1942 and the occupation of the rest of the territory, the civil administrations were quickly suspended. But, on the philatelic market some New Guinea stamps had been known with a forged overprint imitating the Japanese overprint on occupied Dutch East Indies stamps.

== In the south, Papua ==
=== British New Guinea ===
Britain controlled the South-East of the island of New Guinea since late 1884. The colony was administrated from Queensland, whose postage stamps figuring Queen Victoria were in use in British New Guinea between 1885 and 1901. The colonial datestamps bore the "B.N.G." abbreviation.

On 1 July 1901, a stamp series was issued with the name of the colony ("BRITISH NEW GUINEA") printed on it in intaglio by De La Rue in London. The design featured a photograph taken by Captain Barton, Secretary of the Lieutenant-General. It pictured a lakatoi, a local ship, in front of Hanuabada village, near Port Moresby.

=== The Territory of Papua's Lakatoi series ===
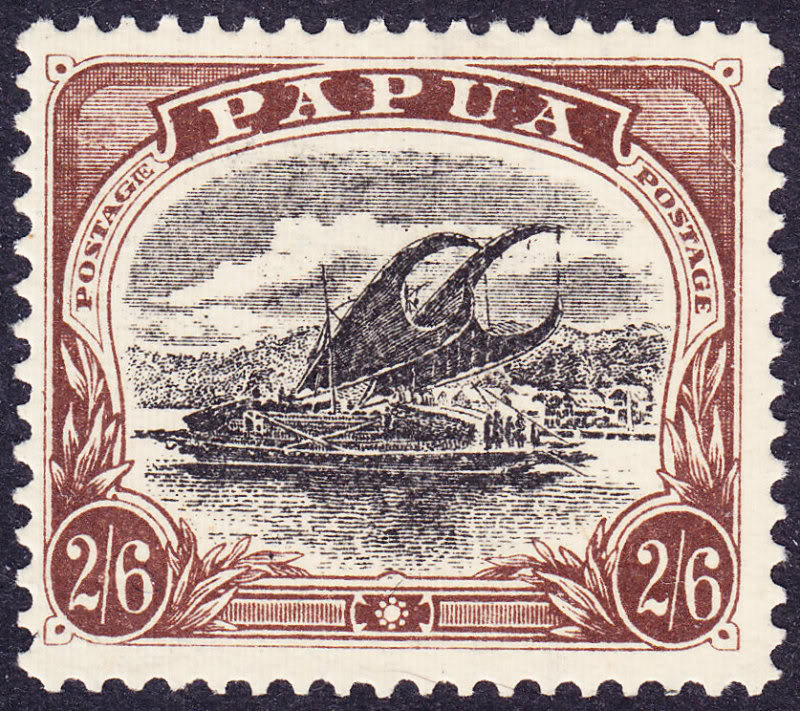
A Papua stamp of the Lakatoi design, first issued 1901, showing the variety POSTAGIE for POSTAGE on the left

In 1902, Britain transferred responsibility for administering British New Guinea to the Commonwealth of Australia under the 1906 Papua Act, including a change of name to Territory of Papua. The remaining stock of Lakatoi stamps was overprinted "PAPUA" and issued in 1906 (for the stamps overprinted in Port Moresby) and in May 1907 for those sent to Brisbane. The search for philatelic income was the motivation for this overprint, more than the political update.

In November 1907, the Lakatoi design was put on stamps printed with the "PAPUA" name, in typography by the same printer than the stamps of Australia, in Melbourne. The design was kept until 1932, with only modifications of colours and values when postal rates were changed in 1912, 1921 and 1924. The sole change that was ill-welcomed by the public was the monocolor issue of 1911. The bicolor design was reused in 1915 and the monocolor stocks were overprint with a one penny value mainly sold to collectors.

In 1929, the first flights transporting some mail took place between Port Moresby and Australia, and to other isolated places in the colony, like the police station in Oroville on the Fly River. Three Lakatoi stamps were surcharged "AIR MAIL" or with a plane for this kind of mail.

The 1929–1931 overprints helped to increase with a 2.5 factor the sale of Papuan postage stamps, essentially thanks to collectors.

=== New illustrated series of George V and George VI's reigns ===
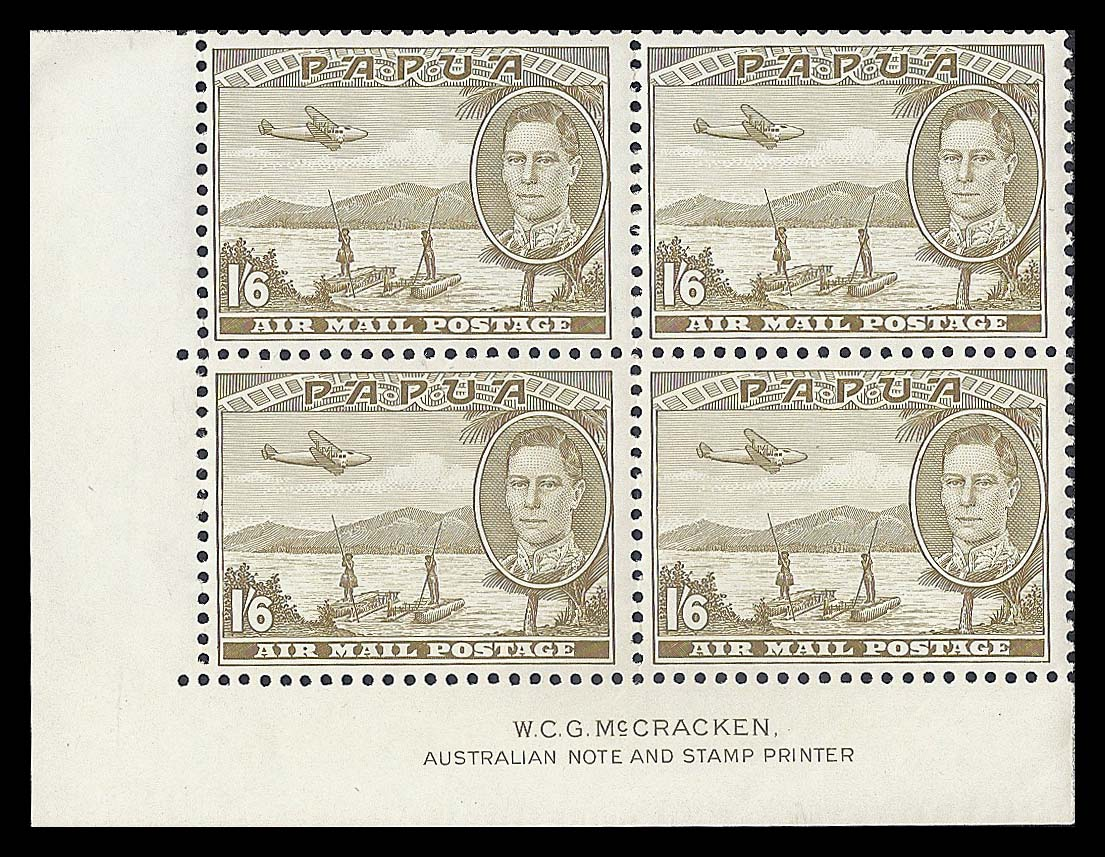
An imprint block of Papua 1941 1s 6d airmail stamps

In 1932, to increase the colony's income, Administrator Hubert Murray ordered the issue of a new postage stamp series, chosen among proposals from colonial administrators. Five unicolor stamps were created with drawings by E. Whitehouse. Inside an ornament by F.E. Williams, two drawings by Williams and nine photographs by Williams and Alfred Gibson gave birth to eleven bicolor stamps. On the sixteen stamps, the Papuan indigenous culture was pictured: a lakatoi, Papuans in traditional clothes, habitations and two identified persons (Steve Dagora, son of Oala^{a}, in ceremonial dress and who became a public servant; and Sergeant-Major Simoi, a policeman). Printed in intaglio in Melbourne, the series was issued on 14 November 1932. It helped generate more than ten thousand pounds in stamp sales for the fiscal year 1932–1933, five times more than 1929–1930, the last year without any new issue.

On 6 November 1934, the fifty year anniversary of British administration was marked with four commemorative stamps designed by Frank Manley and engraved by Edward Broad. They were illustrated with two scenes of 6 June 1884: the Union Jack raised in Port Moresby and the meeting between Commodore Erskine of HMS Nelson and some New Guinean leaders.

As with Nauru and New Guinea, British royal events generated two commemorative stamp issues in Papua. In July 1935, four stamps were reissued overprinted « HIS MAJESTY'S JUBILEE / 1910 1935 » to mark George V's Silver Jubilee. For the coronation of George VI, five denominations were issued in 1937 with the profile photographed by Bertram Park engraved by Frank Manley.

Many stamps reprinted but not overprinted in 1935 were stored in Melbourne. They were finally put on sale in May 1938 at six General Post Offices throughout Australia to collectors as commemorative issues for the first regular airmail flight between New Guinea and Australia.

A stamp issue on 5 September 1938 commemorated the fiftieth anniversary of the founding of the colony of British New Guinea by the United Kingdom. Five airmail stamps were issued with a view of Port Moresby. A new airmail series was released on 6 September 1939 with a drawing by Edward Broad: two Papuans on their rafts overflown by a plane.

At the beginning of the Pacific War, the Japanese occupation of New Guinea in the West and of the Territory of New Guinea to the North forced the suspension of civil administration in Papua on 12 February 1942. The Australian Army's postal service initially used stamps of Papua at first, and subsequently returned to using stamps of Australia. The suppression of civil postal service rendered the reprints of 1932 stamps useless, including a 1/6d. airmail stamp issued in January 1941 for a letter to the United Kingdom.

== The Territory of Papua and New Guinea ==
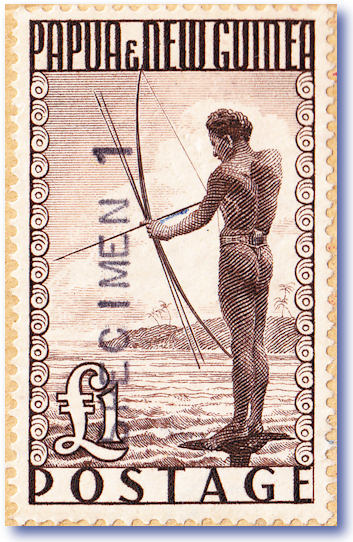
A 1952 £1 PNG stamp overprinted "SPECIMEN 1"

After World War II, stamps of Australia were used in both New Guinea and Papua until 1 March 1953.

On 30 October 1952, the new combined territory received its new stamp series figuring local topics and bearing the name "Territory of Papua and New Guinea".

Aside local cultures, economic activities, fauna and flora, the topics included the signs of political autonomy progressively given to the territory: a Legislative Council in 1961, the territory participation to political and sport events of Oceania and of the Commonwealth of Nations. Starting in the 1960s, European printers like Courvoisier (printer) and Enschedé competed with the official printing plant of Australia. The former introduced photogravure stamps.

On 26 January 1972, with the stamps presenting the new flag and coat of arms of the territory, appeared a new mention "Papua New guinea".

The new coins in kina and its subdivision, the toea, were presented on a five stamp series issued on 21 April 1975. In August, the four stamps marking the fifth South Pacific Games in Guam were the last before independence on 21 September 1975.

== Synthesis ==
This is a synthesis of the stamps used in Papua New Guinea during its philatelic history, distinguished by the country name printed and the currency expressed on the stamps.

German New Guinea, then New Guinea

Year	Stamps used
German New Guinea, then New Guinea
Value in New Guinean mark and pfennig.
1888–1897	stamps of Germany; Deutsche Reichspost
1897–1901	~~Deutsche Reichspost~~; Deutsch-Neu-Guinea
1901–1914	Deutsch Neu-Guinea
Value in Australian shilling and penny.
October 1914	~~Deutsch Neu-Guinea~~; G.R.I.
December 1914	~~Marshall-Inseln~~; G.R.I.
Value in New Guinean pound, shilling and penny.
1915–1925	~~Australia~~; N.W. Pacific Islands
1925–1942	Territory of New Guinea
Key
italic ~~struck~~	mention on stamps mention changed by an overprint

British New Guinea, then Papua

Year	Stamps used
British New Guinea, then Papua
Value in pound, shilling and penny
1885–1901	stamps of Queensland; Queensland
1901–1906	British New Guinea
1906–1907	~~British New Guinea~~; Papua
1907–1910	Papua
Value in Australian pound, shilling and penny
1910–1942	Papua
Key
italic ~~struck~~	mention on stamps mention changed by an overprint

Papua New Guinea

Year	Stamps used
Papua New Guinea
Value in Australian pound, shilling and penny
1945–1953	stamps of Australia; Australia
1953–1965	Papua and New Guinea or Papua & New Guinea
Value in Australian dollar and cent
1966–1971	Papua and New Guinea or Papua & New Guinea
1972–1975	Papua New Guinea
Value in kina and toea
1975–	Papua New Guinea
Key
italic ~~struck~~	mention on stamps mention changed by an overprint

== See also ==
- Postage stamps and postal history of New Guinea

== Sources and references ==
=== Catalogues ===
- "Deutsch-Neuguinea", Michel Deutschland-Spezial 2002, volume 1, 1849 bis April 1945, Schwaneberger editions, ISBN 3-87858-137-8, 2002, pages 529–532.
- Commonwealth Stamp Catalogue Australia, Stanley Gibbons, 2007:
  - "New Guinea" [Occupation and Territory of New Guinea, formerly under German rule], Commonwealth Stamp Catalogue Australia, Stanley Gibbons, 2007, pages 118–120;
  - "Papua (British New Guinea)" [Territory of Papua (former British New Guinea)], Commonwealth Stamp Catalogue Australia, Stanley Gibbons, 2007, pages 135–138;
  - "Papua New Guinea" [until its independence], Commonwealth Stamp Catalogue Australia, Stanley Gibbons, 2007, pages 138–142.

=== Books and articles ===
- Michel Demont, Les Lakatoi de Papouasie (1901–1932), Club philatélique franco-britannique [middle of the 1990s].
- Richard Breckon, "The Stamps of Papua 1932–1941", Gibbons Stamp Monthly, December 2008, pages 68–71. Article written with the help of Geoff Kellow's research at the Note Printing Branche Archives, Reserve Bank of Australia, Sydney.

=== Notes ===
^a Steve Dagora (born 1919) is primarily known because he appeared on a postage stamp of his native Papua in 1932, when he was 13 years old, as the "son of Oala", a reference to his father, Chief Oala of Hanuabada. Steven was educated at the Catholic convent in Koki, a suburb of Port Moresby. He worked with his father both on the farm, and as 2nd engineer on the M. V. Chinsura. By World War II, he had developed a reputation as a competent mechanic. As well as having successful involvement in both the trucking and construction industry, he contributed greatly to his country's agricultural development.
