= Motu people =

Melanesian ethnic group of Papua New Guinea

Motu
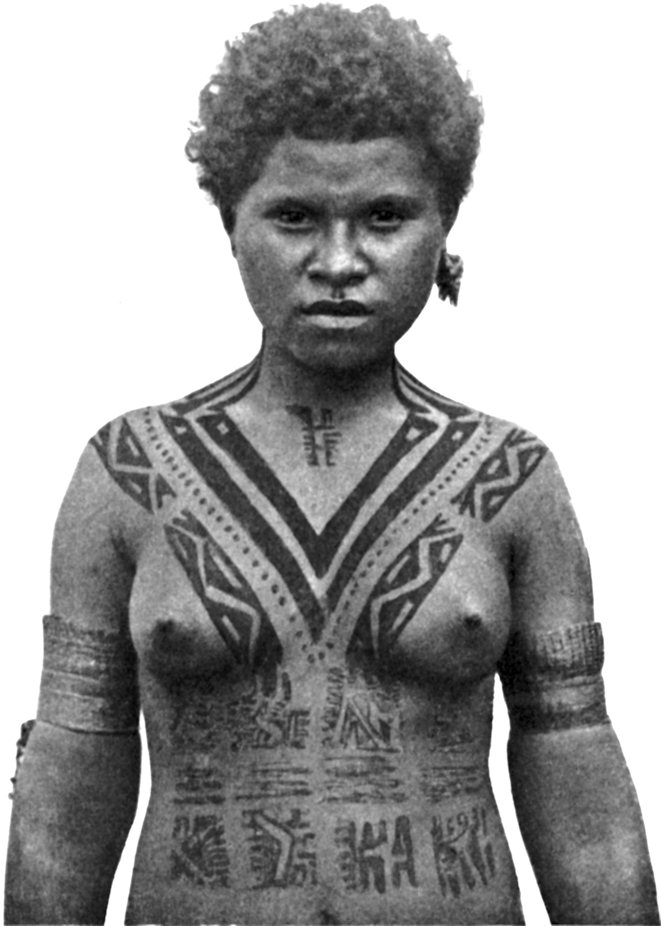
- Tattooing among females of the Koitabu people of Papua New Guinea traditionally began at age five and was added to each year, with the V-shaped tattoo on the chest indicating that she had reached marriageable age, 1912.

Languages
- Motu, Tok Pisin, English

Religion
- Christianity, traditional beliefs

The Motu are native inhabitants of Papua New Guinea, living along the southern coastal area of the country. Their indigenous language is also known as Motu, and like several other languages of the region is an Austronesian language. They and the Koitabu people are the original inhabitants and owners of the land on which Port Moresby — the national capital city — stands. The largest Motu village is Hanuabada, northwest of Port Moresby.

== History ==
German ethnographer Friedrich Ratzel in The History of Mankind in 1896 reported tattooing practices in Melanesia. Among the relatively light-skinned Motu, he found tattooing in patterns similar to those of Micronesia. He also reported, among the old women, blackening the body with a kind of earth which gives a lustre like black lead. This was said to be a sign of mourning.

Charles Gabriel Seligman came into contact with the Motu, in 1904. He noted that, unlike many of their neighbors in the region, the Motu did not practice exogamy. However, there was significant intermarriage between the coastal Motu and the more inland Koitabu. Every year, they practiced the hiri, where community members made trading voyages through the Gulf of Papua; women created pottery for sale through the hiri.

American painter Caroline Mytinger visited Motu villages during her voyage along Melanesia in the 1920s, painting native portraits along the way, including the scene of a Motu girl in dancing costume with a local sorceress in Hanuabada village.

== Culture ==
Despite increased Westernization, the Motu still engage in some traditional practices. These include the value of traditional music and dance, observing the bridewealth and still retaining most of the land rights in the Port Moresby region.

== See also ==
- Motu language
- Hiri Motu language
- Hiri trade cycle
