= Lakatoi =

Sailing watercraft of Papua New Guinea

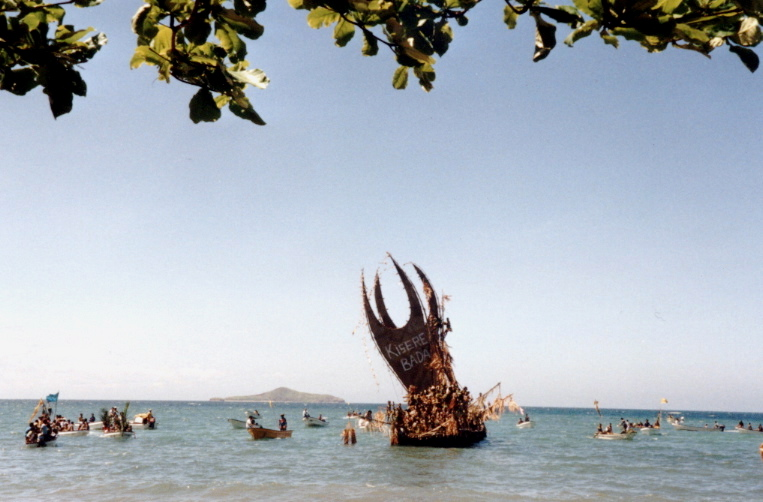
Modern day lakatoi at the Hiri Moale Festival, a modern celebration of the previous Hiri trade cycle

Lakatoi (also Lagatoi) are multiple-hulled sailing watercraft of Papua New Guinea. They are named in the Motu language and traditionally used in the Hiri trade cycle.

Lakatoi (whose literal meaning is three dugouts) are fashioned from two or more dugout logs fastened together to give stability and cargo-carrying capacity. The two or more dugouts are joined by booms, with a platform built on top. The sail is a crab-claw sail. Horridge (2008) discusses the rig and how the craft is manouvred.

== Gallery ==
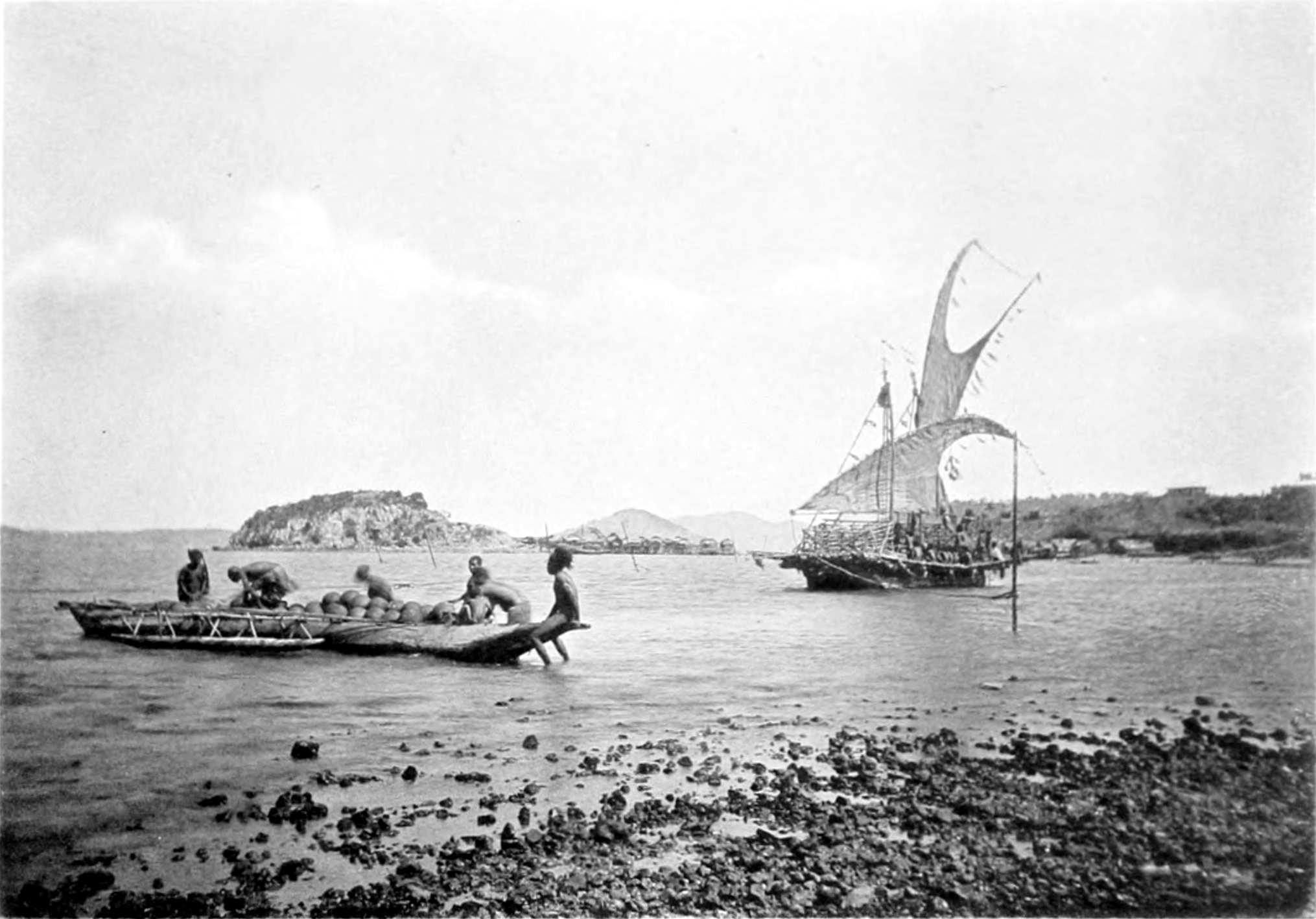
Loading a lakatoi at Port Moresby, prior to 1885

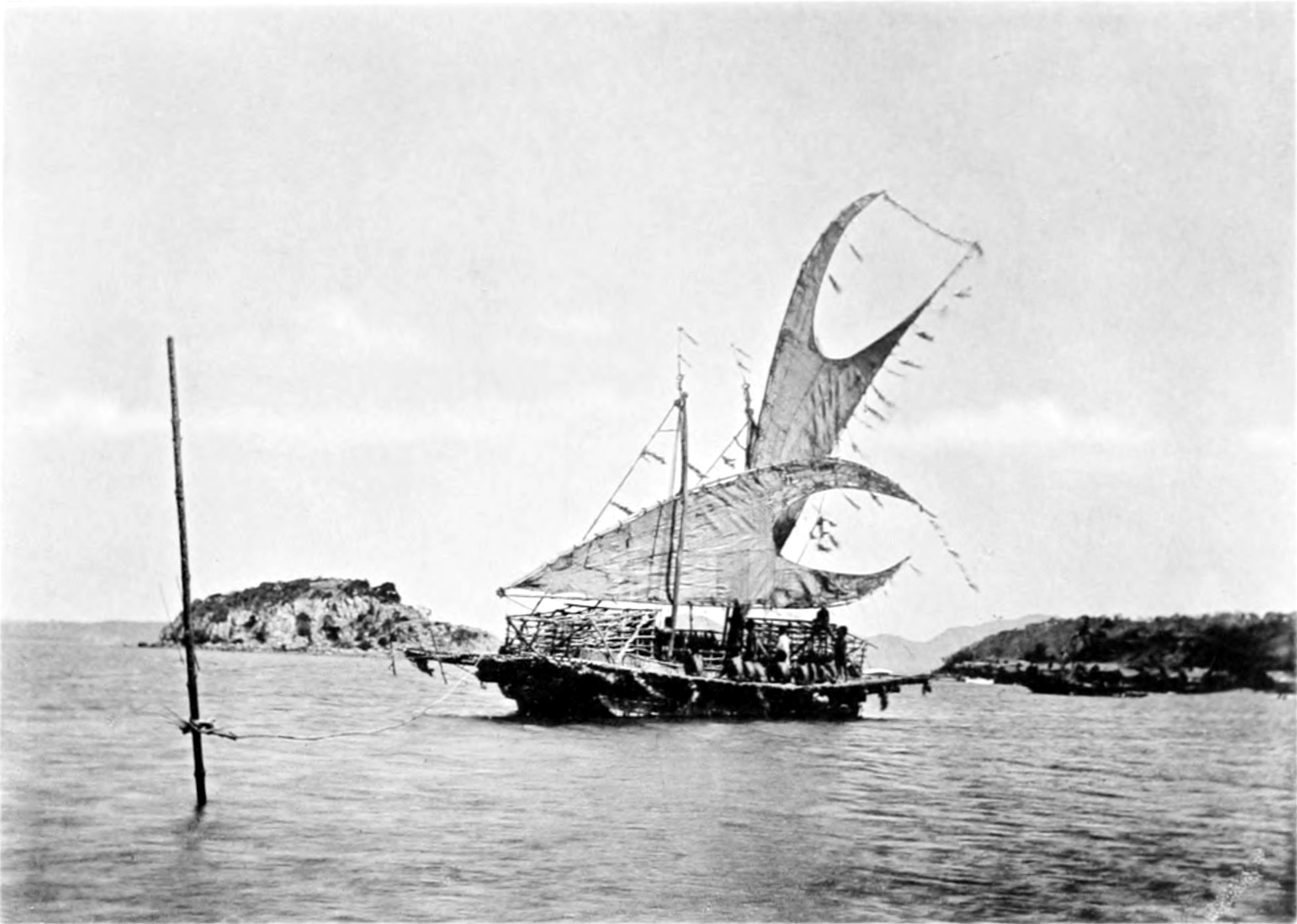
Lakatoi near Elevala Island, prior to 1885

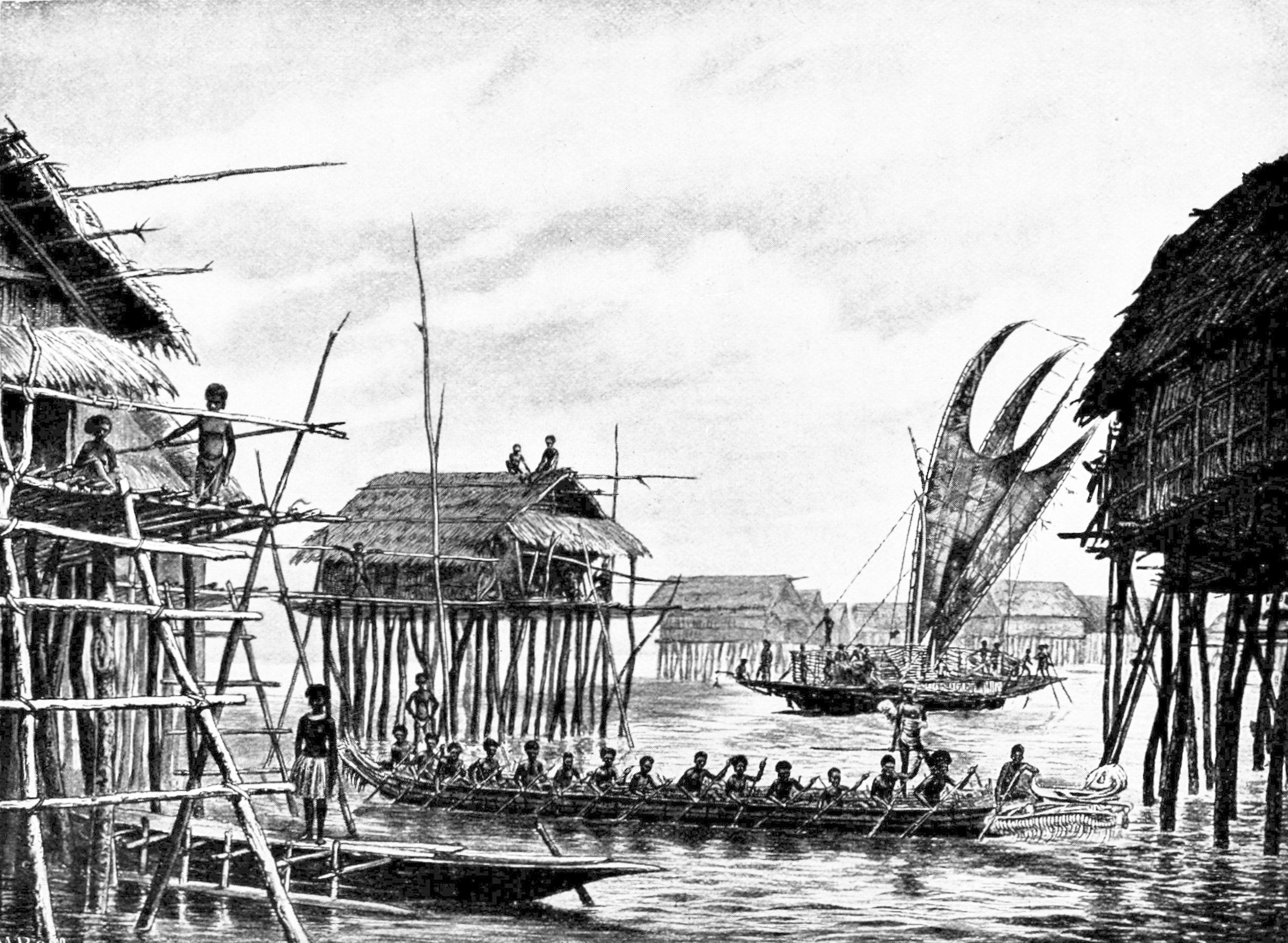
Papuan lake dwellings with a lakatoi under sail, 1898 or before

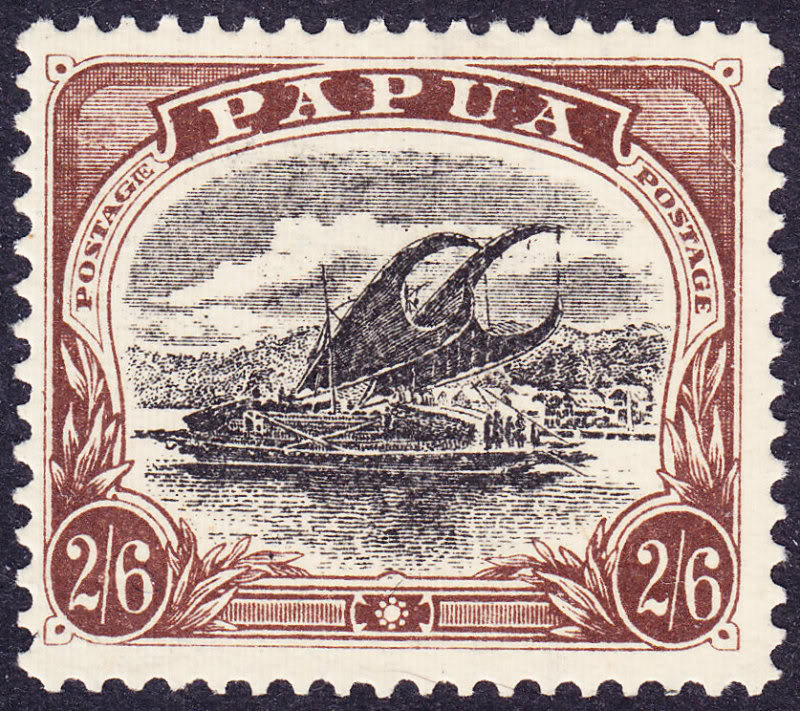
1901 stamp by the British Government depicting a lakatoi

== See also ==
- Crab claw sail
