= Gutnius Lutheran Church =

Lutheran church in Papua New Guinea

- Classification: Protestant
- Orientation: Lutheranism
- Polity: Episcopal
- Head Bishop: The Rev. Nicodemus Aiyene
- Associations: International Lutheran Council, Lutheran World Federation, Papua New Guinea Council of Churches
- Region: Papua New Guinea
- Origin: 1948
- Branched from: Lutheran Church–Missouri Synod
- Congregations: 550
- Members: 125,000 baptized
- Ministers: 250
- Hospitals: 1
- Secondary schools: 1
- Tertiary institutions: 2 seminaries

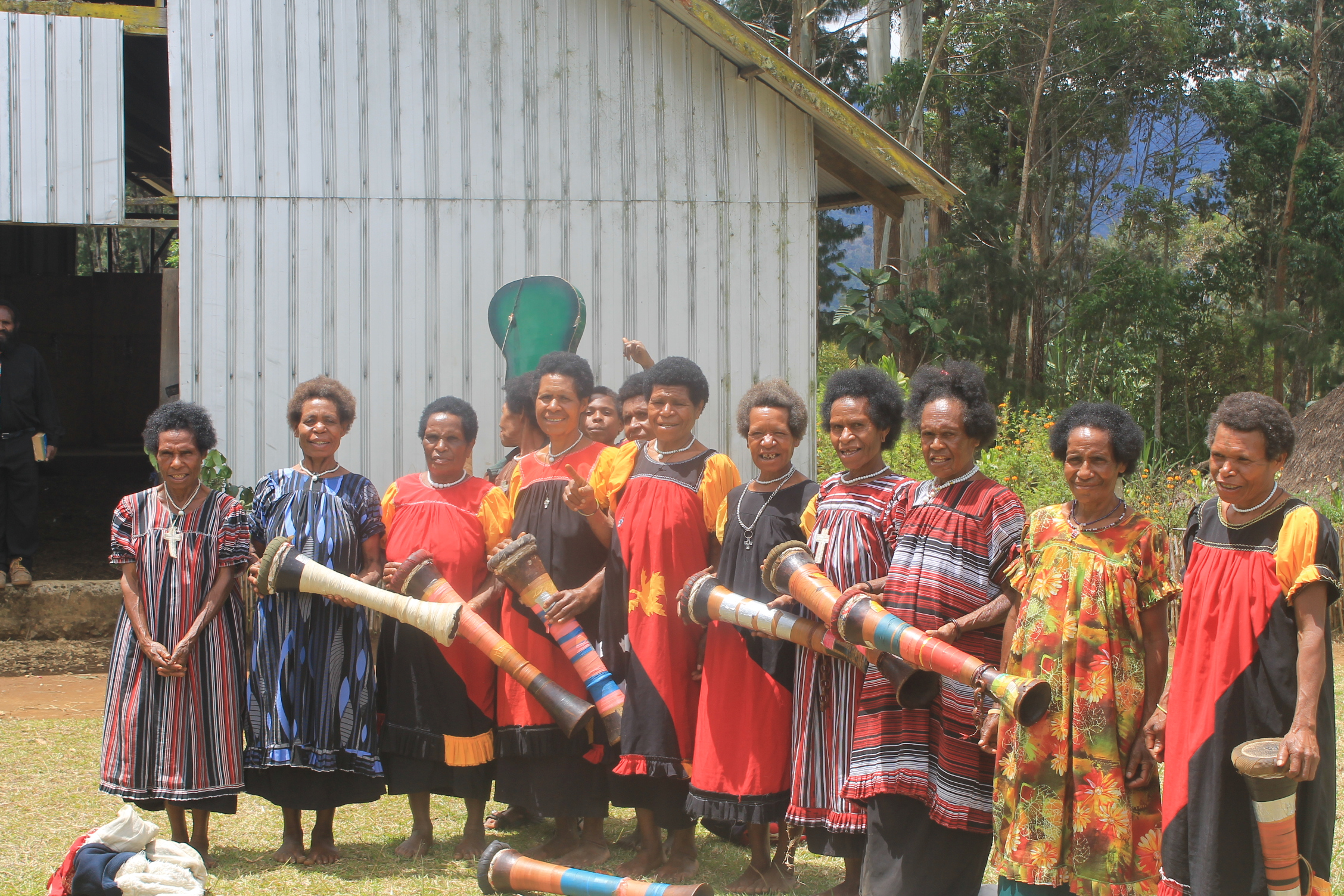
Women of the Gutnius Lutheran Church in Kokas, Kandep District.

The Gutnius Lutheran Church, formerly the Wabag Lutheran Church, is a Lutheran body existing in Papua New Guinea. Gutnius means "Good News" in Tok Pisin. It was established by the Lutheran Church–Missouri Synod in 1948, shortly after the Australian administration of the Territory of Papua and New Guinea permitted missionary activity to spread into the western highlands. The church counts 125.000 parishioners, largely confined to Enga Province in the western highlands. It operates Immanuel Lutheran Hospital and St. Paul's Lutheran Secondary School (Pausa) at Wapenamanda, Enga Province. The church has other health and educational institutions as well.

It has suffered some attrition in numbers as fundamentalist and charismatic sects based in the United States of America have conducted aggressive proselytising activities among its members in the Enga.

In recent decades the church has increasingly established ties with the longer-established, theologically more liberal, and liturgically more conservative Evangelical Lutheran Church of Papua New Guinea. It co-operates with the Evangelical Lutheran Church in conducting clergy education and, with that Lutheran denomination and the Anglican Church of Papua New Guinea, in operating the Balob Teachers College in Lae.
