= Hiri trade cycle =

Traditional Papua New Guinean trade routes

Hiri is the name for the traditional trade voyages that formed an important part of the culture of the Motu people of Papua New Guinea.

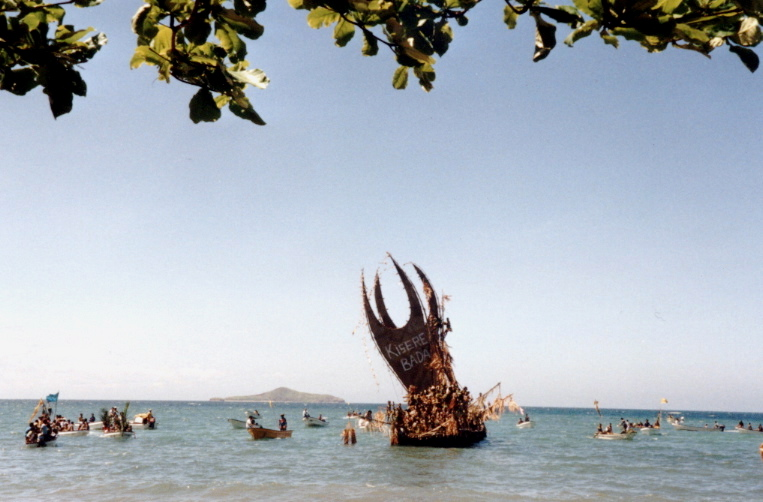
Hiri Moale Festival, celebrating a successful hiri, 23 November 2004

== Origins ==
The Motu live in a comparative rain shadow – the dry season is unusually harsh, and there are not enough suitable areas for the growing of sago (rabia). On the other hand, the Motu, unlike most people of Papua New Guinea, were skilled in the art of making clay cooking pots (uro).

The traditional Hiri voyages carried the much-prized Motu cooking pots to the people of the Gulf of Papua, and brought back plentiful supplies of sago for the Motu.

== Legend ==
Edai Siabo, from the village of Boera, was returning from a fishing trip when a great eel appeared and dragged him under the water. The eel was really the spirit of the sea. He returned Edai to the surface of the sea, after instructing him to build a great lagatoi, to fill it with cooking pots, and to sail westward, following the south-east trade wind called the laurabada in the Motu language. Obeying the spirit, he built the first hiri lagatoi, named it Bogebada (which means sea-eagle), and had it loaded with pots made by his wife. He and his friends then sailed up the coast into the waters of the Gulf of Papua.

For months, the Bogebada and its crew were away. The villagers were all convinced the crew had perished. They mocked Edai's wife, and tried to force her to remarry. Before Edai left, he had instructed her to stay within a corner of her house, not to bathe in the sea, to keep a tally of the days the Bogebada had been gone, to keep her fire burning, and to have her skin tattooed by an old woman. Failing to stick to this routine would endanger the expedition and the lives of Edai and his men.

One day, a lagatoi appeared on the horizon and slowly approached the village. It was Bogebada. Edai was arriving back home, a hero. His wife jumped into the sea and washed away her accumulated dirt, put on her finest costume, walked out onto the verandah of the house, hit it with a stick, shouted, ‘Hedihoroha Bogebada!’ and began dancing in joy.

== Voyages ==
Every year at the end of September or the start of October, Motu men prepared their Lakatoi or lagatoi (a large, multi-hulled sailing canoe) for the hiri, while the women shaped and fired the uro (pots). When the laurabada (south-east trade winds) started to blow, the canoes set off to the west.

The outward voyage was usually comparatively short and uneventful, typically only a week or so. The destination was almost always a village in the Gulf, where the crew of the lagatoi were known from previous voyages, and the trade itself was quickly made. A simplified form of the Motu language (now called Hiri Motu) was used for communication between the traders. The voyagers could not return immediately, however. For a start, they had to wait for the change of the season, and the onset of the lahara, the monsoon wind from the north-west that would carry them home. Secondly, their canoes had to be enlarged and re-built to carry the much more bulky cargo of sago.

After two or three months, the homeward voyage began. This was far more dangerous than the outgoing voyage, as the lahara season produces heavy seas and the risk of severe storms. The lagatoi themselves were burdened by a far heavier cargo, not to mention extra hulls, which enabled more sago to be carried but did little for the seaworthiness or handiness of the canoes. It was an anxious time for the wives of the lagatoi crews, as they faithfully followed the ritual started by Edai's wife to ensure a safe return.

When the lagatoi canoes did return safely, it was a time for great rejoicing (moale).

== Gallery ==
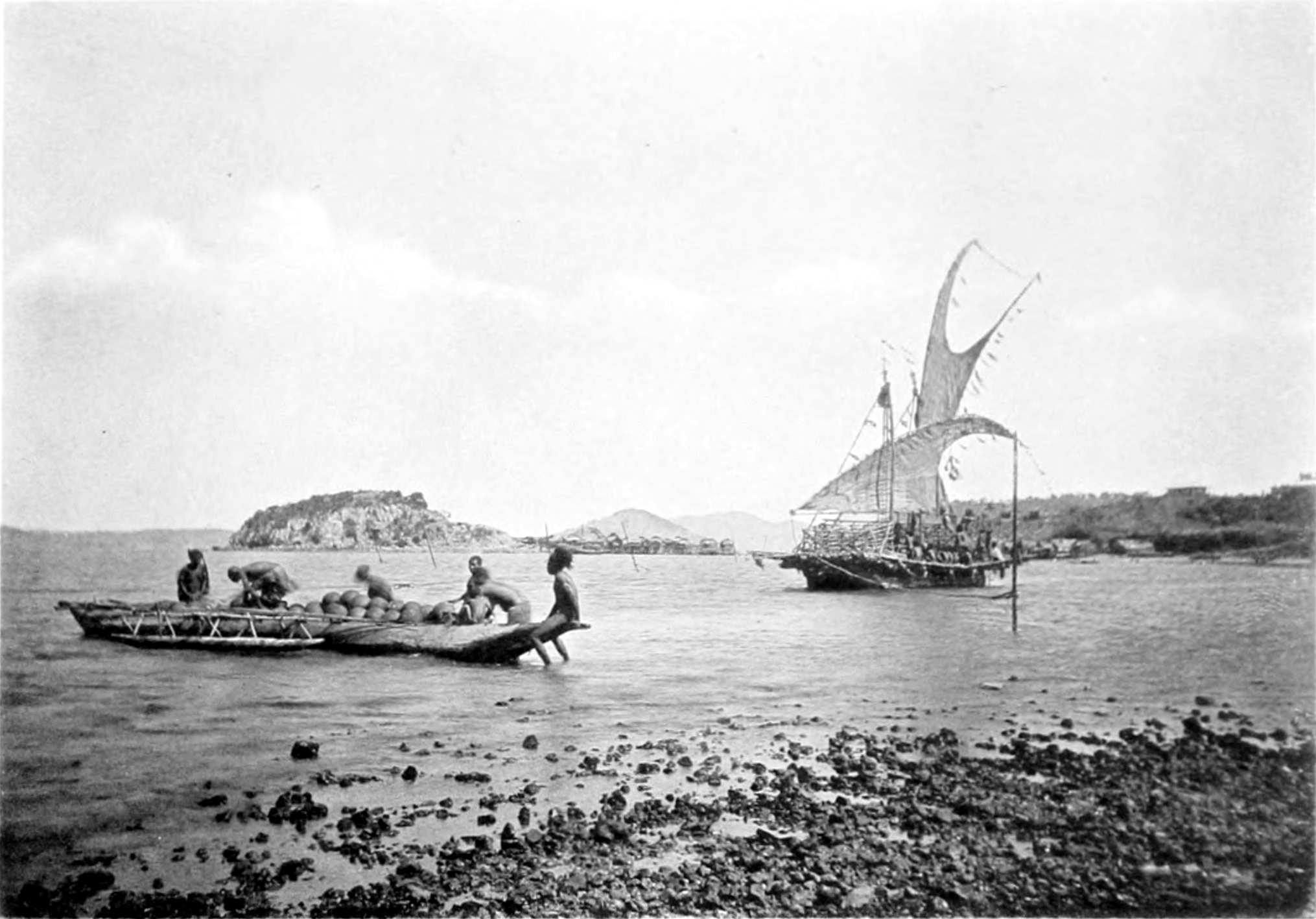
Loading a lakatoi at Port Moresby, prior to 1885.

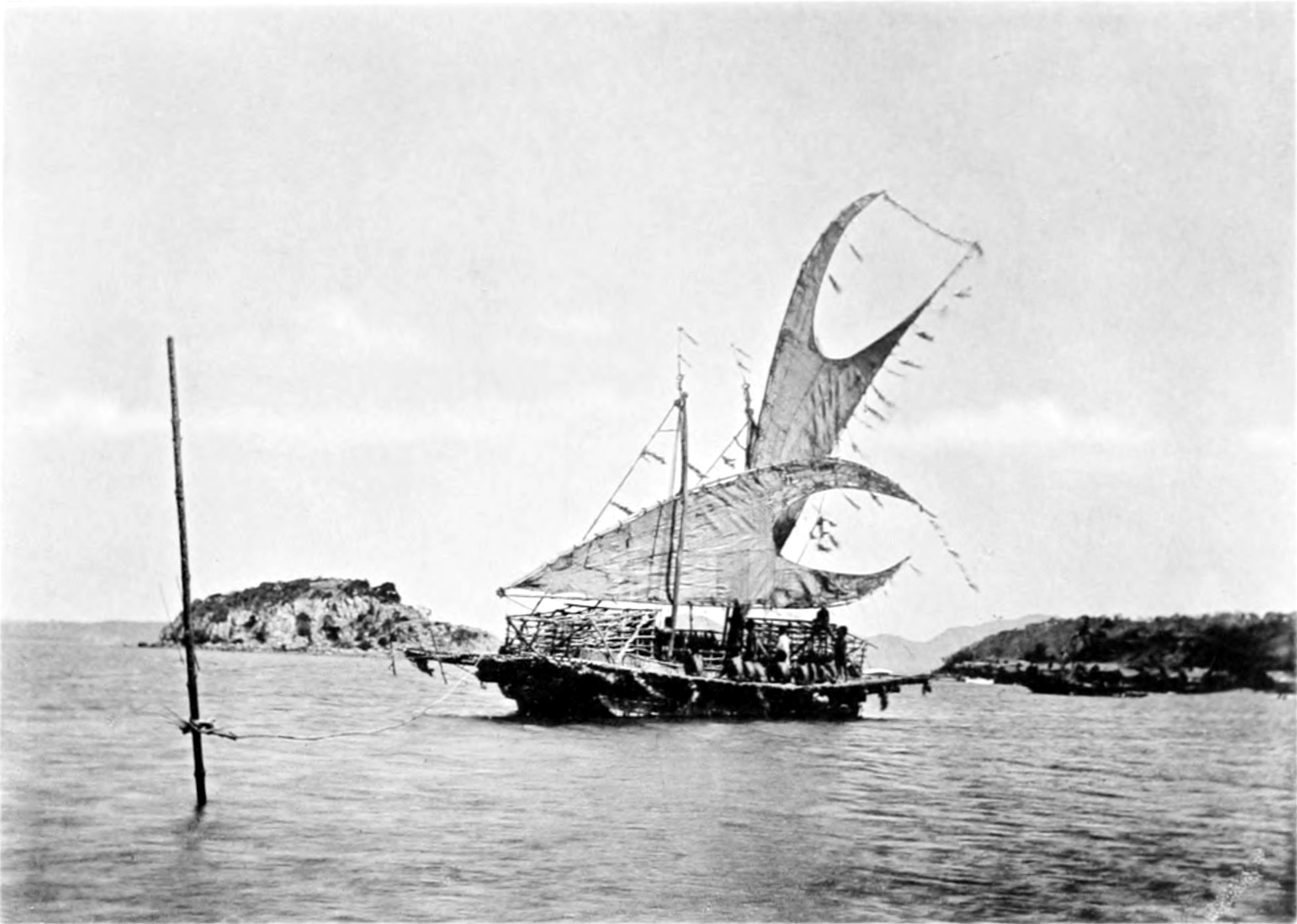
Lakatoi near Elevala Island, prior to 1885.

== Twentieth century and later ==
The Hiri voyages continued, interrupted only by the Second World War, until the late fifties, when a heavily laden and storm-damaged lagatoi foundered off Boera village on its return voyage with heavy loss of life. Further voyages were forbidden by the colonial authorities.

With independence, and the need of Papua New Guineans to preserve and celebrate their culture, the Hiri Moale Festival was started. The festival coincides with the national independence day celebrations, and features traditional dances, the Hiri Queen contest (a beauty pageant), the arrival of the lagatoi, canoe racing, musical presentations, and an arts and crafts exhibition.

In recent years, there has been some controversy about Hiri Moale being held in Port Moresby, rather than at nearby Boera, traditionally regarded as the birthplace of Edai Siabo.
