= Postage stamps and postal history of New Guinea =

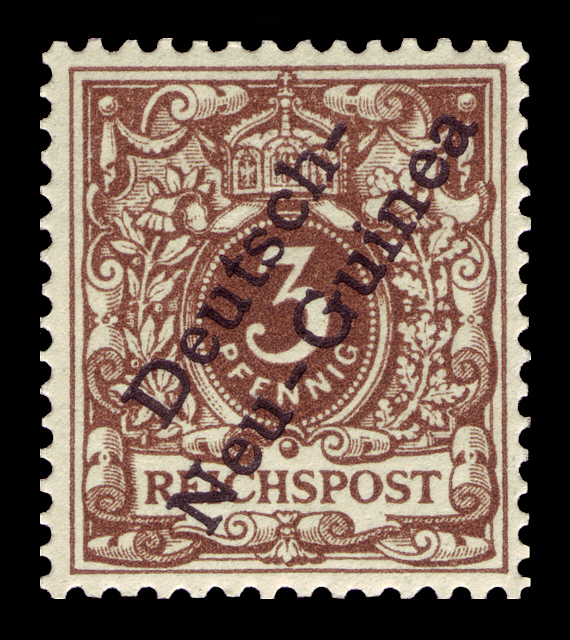
Stamp of Germany overprinted for use in New Guinea, issued in 1897

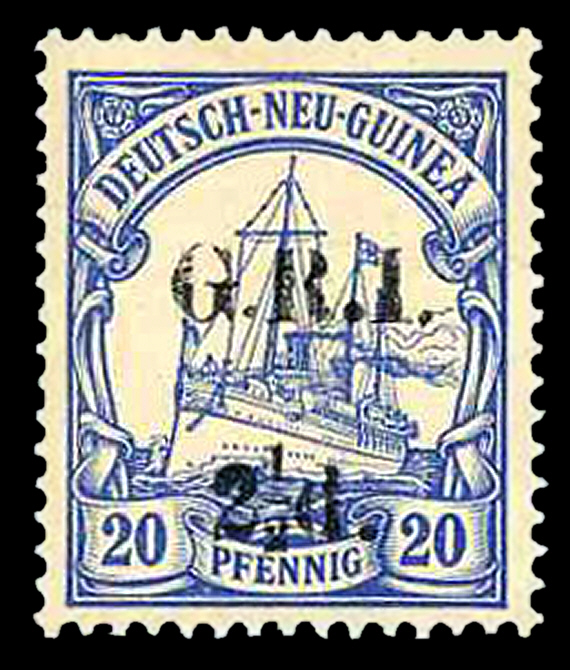
A stamp of German New Guinea overprinted by the Australian occupation forces

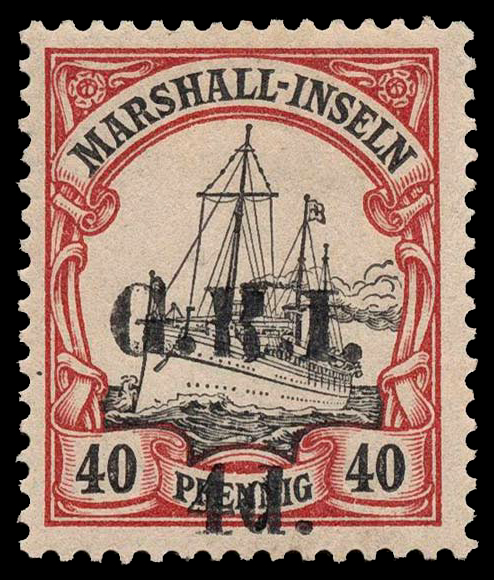
A stamp of German Marshall Islands overprinted by the Australian occupation forces

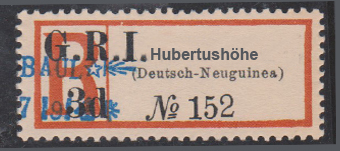
Overprint Registration Label New Guinea overprinted by the Australian occupation forces

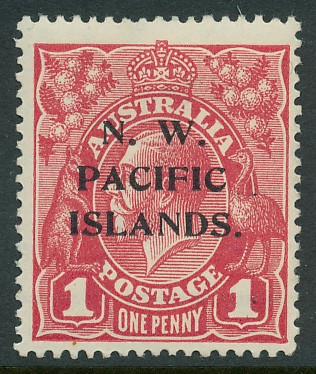
Stamp of Australia overprinted "North West Pacific Islands", 1918

The postage stamps of New Guinea, part of present-day Papua New Guinea, were issued up to 1942.

== German colony ==
In German New Guinea, in the Bismarck Archipelago and the North Solomon Islands, the first German post offices opened in 1888 and used some stamps of the German Reich, issued between 1875 and 1887 (denomination in an oval or imperial eagle series). On the mail, they were cancelled with a round datestamp bearing the name of the town in the upper part and a five arm star in the lower. The "DEUTSCH- / NEU-GUINEA" mention appeared in the middle of datestamps some years after, and there can be two or three stars.

In 1897 and 1898, six stamps of Germany were overprinted with the name of the colony, printed in diagonal on two lines. It is in 1901 that the first stamps were issued with the name of the colony printed on them, in the German colonial series, picturing the imperial yacht Hohenzollern.

== Australian occupation ==
When the Australian Naval and Military Expeditionary Force occupied German New Guinea in 1914, it met the need for postage stamps by overprinting existing stocks of the (unwatermarked) German New Guinea and Marshall Islands stamps with "G.R.I." (short for Georgius Rex Imperator, referring to the incumbent British King George V). Values ranged from one penny to five shillings, and roughly corresponded with the values of the original stamps expressed in pfennigs: 1d on 3pf and 5pf stamps, 2d on 10pf and 20pf, and so forth.

The Australians issued a first setting of the overprint on 17 October 1914, followed by a second setting (with slightly different spacing) on 16 December. In all, they produced some 50 distinct stamps.

In addition, Australian postal authorities pressed registration labels into service as 3d stamps, overprinted in the same way as the others. Labels of the Deulon, Friedrich Wilhelmshaven, Herbertshöhe, Kavieng, Kieta, Manus, Rabaul, and Maron post offices became overprinted in this manner.

Because of the short period of use of these issues, they occur quite rarely, and command high prices; the most common denominations cost at least US$15 a piece, and the five-shilling overprints fetch prices of over $10,000 on the rare occasions when they come up for sale. In addition, the overprinting process produced a number of errors, and these also command high prices.

In 1915 these improvised stamps of New Guinea were superseded with stamps of the "North West Pacific Islands".

== Australian mandate ==
In 1925, the Australian administration in the League of Nations mandate of the Territory of New Guinea issued the first stamp series.

With the Japanese attack on Rabaul in New Britain in January 1942 and the occupation of the rest of the territory, the civil administrations were eventually suspended.

After World War II, the territories of Papua and New Guinea were combined in an administrative union as the Territory of Papua and New Guinea.

== See also ==
- Postage stamps and postal history of the German colonies - German New Guinea
- Postage stamps and postal history of Papua New Guinea

== Sources ==
- Stanley Gibbons Ltd: various catalogues
- Stuart Rossiter & John Flower: The Stamp Atlas
