= United Church in Papua New Guinea and Solomon Islands =

United church in Methodist and the Reformed tradition

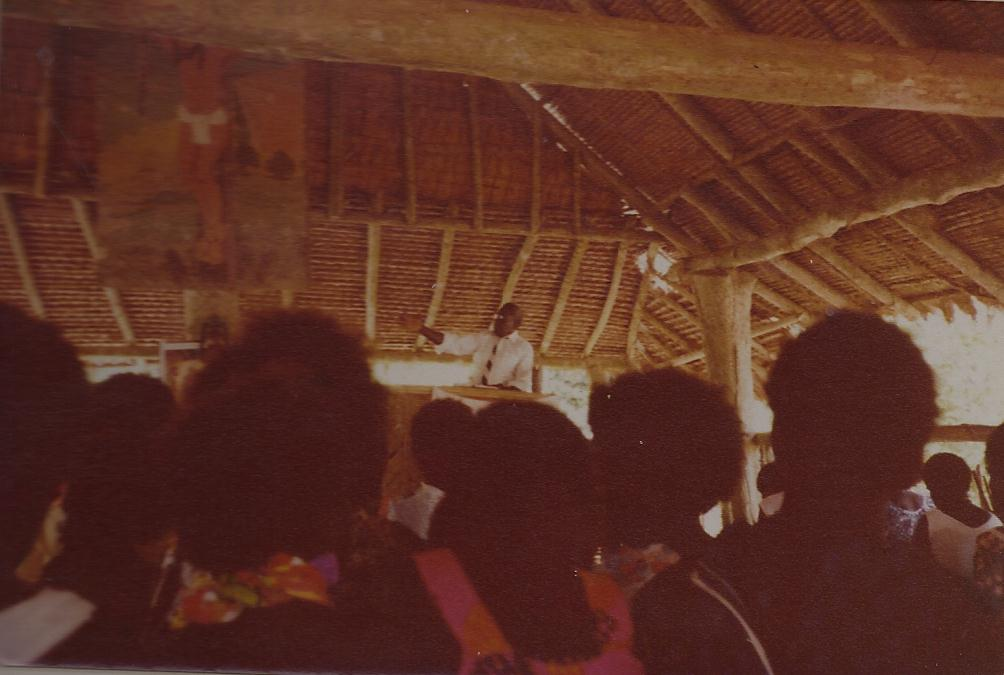
Village United Church preacher in Siwai, Bougainville, 1978.

The United Church in Papua New Guinea and Solomon Islands is a United church in the Methodist and the Reformed tradition.

It was created in 1968 and ran until 1996 when a separate United Church in Solomon Islands was formed; the denomination is now known as The United Church in Papua New Guinea.

In 2026, the church has 600,000 members across 2700 congregations.

== History ==
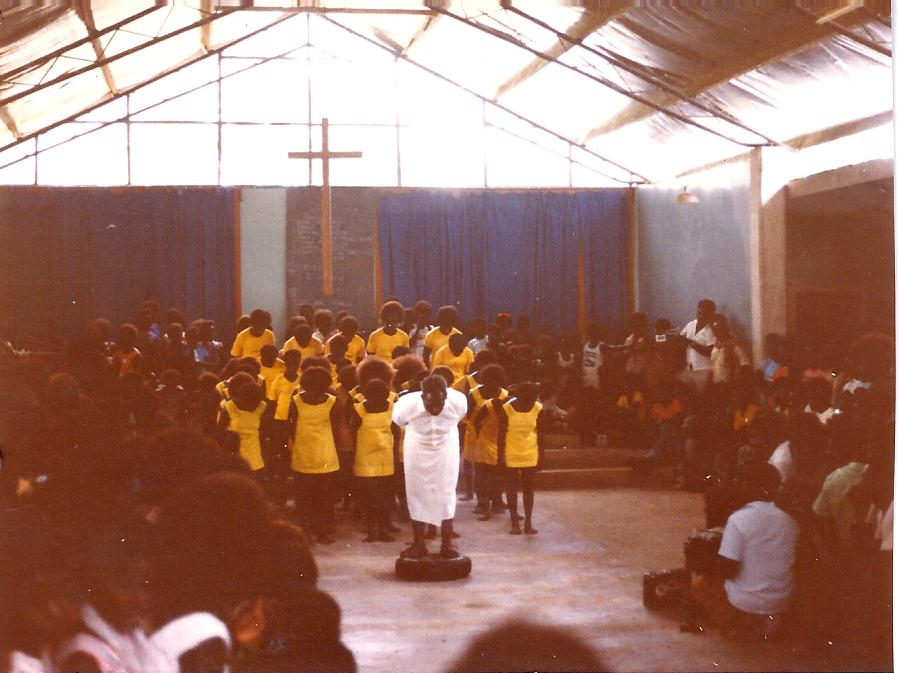
Village United Church choir in a choral competition in Siwai, Bougainville, 1978.

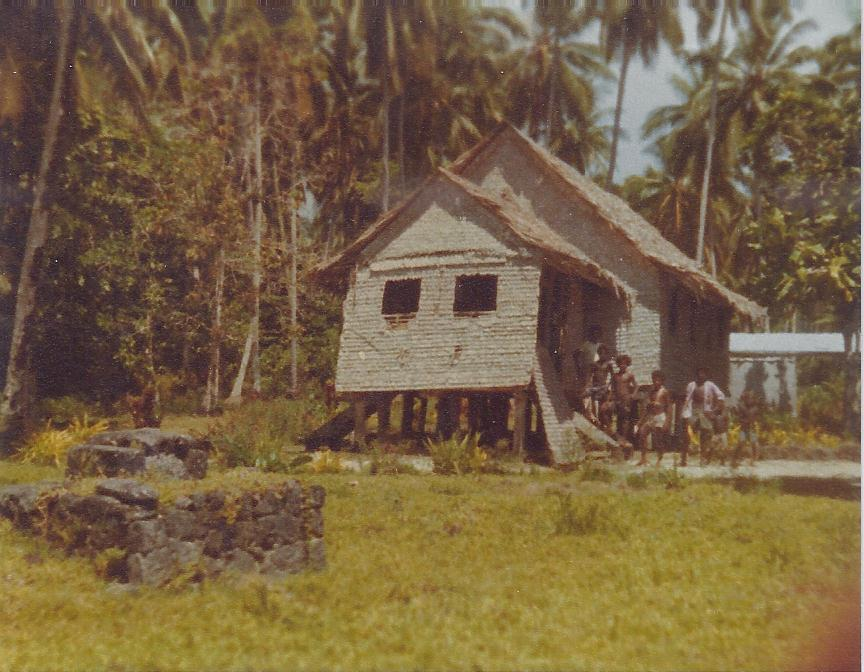
United Church in a West Solomons village with a monument bearing bones from the people's cannibalism past.

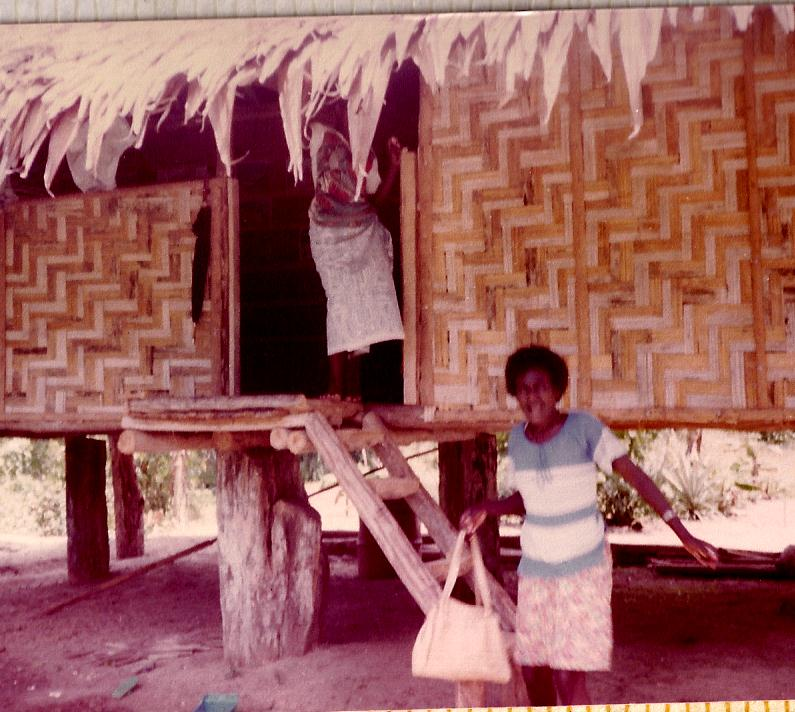
Female minister of the United Church in a south Bougainvillean village.

The church was formed in 1968 by merging the efforts of the London Missionary Society (operating exclusively in Papua), the relatively marginal Presbyterian church (largely confined to Port Moresby itself) and the Methodist mission (largely operating in New Guinea and nearby islands, the western and northern Solomons and the islands of eastern Papua).

On 23 March 1969, Rev. Leslie Boseto became the first Solomon Islands Bishop at a ceremony at Gizo; Rev. Jack Sharp was the denomination’s Moderator.

By 1970, the church was running several primary schools, a high school and a hospital.

The formation of the United Church pre-dates the merger of its corresponding (and one missionary parent though Methodists from New Zealand) denominations in Australia in 1977 in the Uniting Church in Australia but such cross-denominational mergers were common throughout the 20th century, particularly in Commonwealth countries: for example; the United Church of Northern India (1924) (now merged in the later and wider Church of North India, Church of Pakistan, and Church of Bangladesh); the United Church of Canada (1925) and the Church of South India (1947). It is particularly strong on the Papuan coast, the Southern Highlands, eastern Papua, the New Guinea Islands (including Bougainville, also known as the North Solomons), and the Western Solomons. Unlike the Anglican and Roman Catholic churches in Papua New Guinea for reasons of church tradition as well as for Anglicans' cultural attitudes where it is substantial, the United Church welcomes female clergy. Like Presbyterian, Methodist, Congregationalist and United or Uniting churches elsewhere, its services are primarily for worship with scripture lessons, prayers and sermons, communion being once in a month or every few months. As these denominations in western countries have in recent years lost many members and participants to a lack of worship at all in recent decades, the United Church of Papua New Guinea and Solomon Islands has lost some to more fundamentalist sects.

== Local and overseas affiliations ==
In 2026, the church is a member of the Pacific Conference of Churches and the World Council of Churches.

The church has been a member of the Papua New Guinea Council of Churches and Melanesian Council of Churches. In matters of social policy it tends as with its sister denominations in other Commonwealth countries to be largely in accord with the Anglican and Lutheran churches.

Traditionally, many of the United Church's personnel were recruited from earlier-established Methodist and Congregationalist churches in Fiji, Samoa, and Tonga; the United Church continues to have close relations with sister churches in these neighbouring island countries. Its theology and social policy tends to be somewhat more akin to these theologically conservative neighbouring countries' long-established evangelical Protestant churches than to those in Australia. On the other hand, the Church is considerably more broad-minded in such matters than more recently arrived fundamentalist groups, and it maintains the historic Methodist and Congregational strong emphasis on education and literacy in the broadest sense. As with the Anglican and Lutheran churches, the United Church has suffered some attrition in recent decades as a result of aggressive proselytising among its constituents by fundamentalist and Pentecostal groups originating in the United States of America and, to a lesser extent, Australia.

Many of Papua New Guinea's leaders have had a United Church background.

== Eminent United Churchmen and Churchwomen in PNG politics ==
- Rabbie Namaliu
- Mekere Morauta
- Paulias Matane
- Bill Skate
- Buri Kidu
- Mari Kapi

== Literature ==
- Neville Threlfall, One Hundred Years in the Islands. The Methodist/United Church in the New Guinea Islands Region 1875–1975, The United Church (New Guinea Islands Region), Toksave na Buk dipatmen: Rabaul 1975, ISBN 0 86938 016 8

== See also ==
- Anglican Church of Papua New Guinea
- Evangelical Lutheran Church of Papua New Guinea
