= Papua New Guinea Council of Churches =

The Papua New Guinea Council of Churches (PNGCC) is a Christian ecumenical council in Papua New Guinea.

The Council has four major programs:

- Social Concerns Desk
- Women's Desk
- Youth Desk
- Special Projects
- Theological programs
- Administration

Its members comprise:

- Anglican Church of Papua New Guinea
- Gutnius Lutheran Church (affiliated with the Lutheran Church–Missouri Synod)
- Independent Fundamental Baptist
- Roman Catholic Church
- Evangelical Lutheran Church of Papua New Guinea
- United Church in Papua New Guinea and the Solomon Islands
- Salvation Army

== See also ==
- National Council of Churches in Australia
- World Council of Churches
