= Hiri Motu =

Austronesian language of Papua New Guinea

- Police Motu
- Region: Papua New Guinea
- Native speakers: "Very few" (cited 1992); 100,000 L2 speakers (2021)
- Language family: Austronesian: Malayo-Polynesian; Oceanic; Western Oceanic; Papuan Tip; Central; Sinagoro–Keapar; Motu; Hiri Motu
- Writing system: Latin script

Official status
- Official language in: Papua New Guinea

Language codes
- ISO 639-1: ho
- ISO 639-2: hmo
- ISO 639-3: hmo
- Glottolog: hiri1237

Hiri Motu, also known as Police Motu, Pidgin Motu, or just Hiri, is a language of Papua New Guinea, which is spoken in surrounding areas of its capital city, Port Moresby.

It is a simplified version of Motu, from the Austronesian language family. Although it is strictly neither a pidgin nor a creole, it possesses some features from both language types. Phonological and grammatical differences make Hiri Motu not mutually intelligible with Motu. The languages are lexically very similar, and retain a common, albeit simplified, Austronesian syntactical basis. It has also been influenced to some degree by Tok Pisin.

Even in the areas where it was once well established as a lingua franca, the use of Hiri Motu has been declining in favour of Tok Pisin and English for many years. The language has some statutory recognition. (Note: Specific legislation proclaiming official languages in Papua New Guinea seems not to exist – but see Constitution of Papua New Guinea: Preamble – Section 2/11 (literacy) – where Hiri Motu is mentioned (with Tok Pisin and English) as languages in which universal literacy is sought – and also section 67 2(c) (and 68 2(h), where conversational ability in Hiri Motu is mentioned (with Tok Pisin or “a vernacular of the country”) as a requirement for citizenship by nationalisation (one of these languages required))

== Origins ==
The term hiri is the name for the traditional trade voyages that created a culture and style of living for the Motu people. Hiri Motu became a common language for a police force known as Police Motu.

The name Hiri Motu was conceptualised in the early 1970s during a conference held by the Department of Information and Extension Services. During the conference, the committee recommended the name Hiri Motu for several reasons.

- The language's history is older than the name Police Motu implies. That was recommended because it was simplified from the language of the Motu people, which was the language used when they traded goods with their customers.
- Police Motu was then never used as a language of trade or social contact. Since the unity of New Guinea Police Force in 1946, Police Motu had lost most of its functions in police work. Pidgin was adopted at the time and was used with the majority of the police force.
- The committee thought that the new name should have some meaning behind it. Instead of associating a language with the police, they thought the language should reflect the legacy of the language and how it is used in everyday life.

=== Motu people ===
The Motu people are native inhabitants of Papua New Guinea who live along the southern coastal line of their country. They typically live in dry areas, on the leeward side of the mountain, where dry seasons are harsh on the people who live there. Traditional Hiri voyages carried prized treasures to the people of the Gulf of Papua.

== Dialects ==
Hiri Motu has two dialects: "Austronesian" and "Papuan". Both dialects are Austronesian in both grammar and vocabulary due to their derivation from Motu; the dialect names refer to the first languages spoken by users of this lingua franca. The "Papuan" dialect (also called "non-central") was more widely spoken and was used as the standard for official publications since around 1964. The "Austronesian" (or "central") dialect is closer to Motu in grammar and phonology, and its vocabulary is both more extensive and closer to the original language. It was the prestige dialect, which was regarded by speakers as being more "correct".

The distinction between Motu and its "pidgin" dialects has been described as blurred. They form a continuum from the original "pure" language, through the established creoles, to what some writers have suggested constitutes a form of "Hiri Motu–based pidgin" used as a contact language with people who had not fully acquired Hiri Motu, such as Eleman and Koriki speakers.

== Phonology ==
Consonants
		Labial	Alveolar	Velar	Glottal
Nasal		m	n		
Plosive	voiceless	p	t	k	
Plosive	voiced	b	d	ɡ	
Fricative		β	s		h
Tap			ɾ		
Approximant		w	l		

Vowels
	Front	Central	Back
Close	i		u
Mid	ɛ		ɔ
Open		a	

== Syntax ==
=== Personal pronouns ===
In the Hiri Motu language, the distinction between "inclusive" and "exclusive" forms of 'we' is very important. In the former case, 'we' applies to the speaker and listener while in the latter case 'we' does not include the listener.

Personal pronouns
We (inclusive)	We (exclusive)
Ita	Ai

==== Possessives ====
- egu 'my'
- emai 'our (inclusive)'
- eda 'our (exclusive)'
- emu 'your (singular)'
- emui 'your (plural)'
- ena 'her/his/its/their' (singular)'
- edia 'their (plural)'

Motu	Translation	S.	Pl
oi-emu	Yours	x	
lau-egu	mine		
umui-emui	yours		x
idia	they		

For example, in the table above, lau-egu is placed before the noun, such as lau-egu boroma ('my pig').

The first half of the word (lau, oi) may be taken out of the word. For example, lau-egu boroma can be shortened to egu boroma.

==== Postpositions ====
Hiri Motu uses postpositions. A standard postposition is ai, which can mean 'in', 'on', or 'at'. For example, maua ai means 'in the box', pata ai means 'on the table', and Konedobu ai means 'at Konedobu (a location in Papua)'.

Because Hiri Motu does not allow double vowels, ai will often fuse with the word. Some examples:

- lalo-na-ai → lalonai – 'in, inside'
- lata-na-ai → latanai – 'on, on top of'

=== Word order ===
There are two word orders in Hiri Motu: subject–object–verb (SOV) and object-subject-verb (OSV), both of which can be used interchangeably (OSV is more common in Hiri Motu). These sentence structures either start with a subject which is followed by an object, or vice versa start with an object which is followed by a subject, and both end with a verb. The sentence always ends with a verb regardless of the word order.

As word order can be arbitrarily chosen, ambiguity may arise in some cases.

For example, Inai mero boroma badana ia alaia can either mean 'This boy killed a big pig' or 'A big pig killed this boy'. To solve this, a subject marker can be used. In Hiri Motu, the subject marker is ese, which is placed immediately after the subject of the sentence.

With it, the sentence reads: Inai mero ese boroma badana ia alaia (literally, 'This boy <subject marker>, a big pig he killed.') - 'This boy killed a big pig.'

The subject marker should only be used in cases where ambiguity occurs. Subject markers are never used in sentences with intransitive verbs.

=== Interrogatives ===
Hiri Motu	Translation
Daika?	Who? Whom?
Dahaka?	What?
Daika ena?	Whose?
Dahaka dainai?/Badina dahaka?	Why?
Edeheto?/Edana bamona?	How?
Hida?	How many?
Edeseni?/Edeseni ai?	Where?
Edana negai?	When?

Edana is sometimes spelt and pronounced edena.

Hida always follows the noun it is referring to, while edana always follows it.

Questions should be asked affirmatively, as otherwise some of the answers received can be confusing.

For example, receiving the reply oibe ('yes') to the question la mai lasi? ('hasn't he come?') can mean 'Yes, he hasn't come yet'. If the person has arrived, the answer would be: Lasi, ia mai ('No, he has come').

=== Conjunctions ===
Hiri Motu	Translation
eiava	or
bona	and
bema	if
bena, vadaeni	then
a, to	but
badina	because

Examples:

- Oi raka namonamo, oi keto garina. ('Walk carefully, lest you fall.')
- Sinavai dekenai ia lao, haoda totona. ('He went to the river (in order) to catch fish.')

=== 'To be' and 'to have' ===
When 'to be' is used as a connecting word, the particles na and be can be used and are interchangeable.

For example: Ia be mero namona or la na mero namona both mean 'he is a good boy'.

There is no Hiri Motu verb form for 'to have' in the sense of possession. In true Hiri Motu, a local would express that they have a dog with the phrase Lau na mai egu sisia for 'I have a dog', (literally, 'I with my dog'.) There are no standards for these expressions in Hiri Motu.

== Numbers ==
The numbers 1–5 in Hiri Motu are, respectively, ta, rua, toi, hani, ima. The number system in Hiri Motu goes up to 100,000. Many of the numbers in Hiri Motu are polysyllabic. For example, 99 in Hiri Motu is taurahanita ahui taurahanita. Most Papuans know the English number system and use that instead.

== History ==
The language has a history pre-dating European contact; it developed among members of the Hiri trade cycle (mainly in sago and clay pots) between the Motu people and their neighbours on the southeast coast of the island of New Guinea. (Note: This is disputed by Dutton.) In early European colonial days, the use of Hiri Motu was spread due to its adoption by the Royal Papuan Constabulary (hence the name Police Motu). By the early 1960s, Hiri Motu was the lingua franca of a large part of the country. It was the first language for many people whose parents came from different language groups (typically the children of policemen and other public servants).

Since the early 1970s, if not earlier, the use of Hiri Motu as a day-to-day lingua franca in its old "range" has been gradually declining in favour of English and Tok Pisin. Today its speakers tend to be elderly and concentrated in Central and Gulf provinces. Younger speakers of the "parent language" (Motu proper) tend to be unfamiliar with Hiri Motu, and few of them understand or speak it well.
