= Motu language =

Austronesian language of Papua New Guinea

Motu
- Pure Motu, True Motu
- Native to: Papua New Guinea
- Region: Central Province
- Ethnicity: Motuan
- Native speakers: 39,000 (2008)
- Language family: Austronesian: Malayo-Polynesian; Oceanic; Western Oceanic; Papuan Tip; Central; West; Motu
- Writing system: Latin script (Motu alphabet); Motu Braille

Language codes
- ISO 639-3: meu
- Glottolog: motu1246

Motu (sometimes called Pure Motu or True Motu to distinguish it from Hiri Motu) is a Central Papuan Tip language that is spoken by the Motuans, an indigenous ethnic group of Papua New Guinea. It is commonly used today in the region, particularly around the capital, Port Moresby.

A simplified form of Motu developed as a trade language in the Papuan region, in the southeast of the main island of New Guinea, originally known as Police Motu, and today known as Hiri Motu. After Tok Pisin and English, Hiri Motu was at the time of independence the third most commonly spoken of the more than 800 languages of Papua New Guinea, although its use has been declining for some years, mainly in favour of Tok Pisin.

Motu is classified as one of the Malayo-Polynesian languages and bears some linguistic similarities to Polynesian and Micronesian languages.

== Phonology ==
Motu is a typical Austronesian language in that it is heavily vowel-based. Every Motu syllable ends in a vowel sound — this may be preceded by a single consonant (there are no "consonant clusters"). Vowel sounds may be either monophthongs (consisting of a single basic sound) or diphthongs (consisting of more than one basic sound).

There are only five vowel sounds /a, e, i, o, u/; Motu diphthongs are written and pronounced as combinations of two vowels. The sounds oi and oe, ai and ae, au and ao (approximately like English boy, high, cow), and r and l are distinguished in Motu but not in Hiri Motu. There is no letter f; when it occurs in loan words, it is usually represented as p.

		Labial	Alveolar	Velar		Glottal
		Labial	Alveolar	plain	labialized	Glottal
Stop	voiceless	p	t	k	kʷ	
Stop	voiced	b	d	ɡ	ɡʷ	
Fricative		v	s	ɣ		h
Nasal		m	n			
Approximant			l			
Flap			ɺ			

- Taylor (1970) claims that the velar stops and fricative are advanced before front vowels or retracted before back vowels.

Motu Braille has the usual letter assignments apart from ḡ, which is ⠿.
