= Pasifika Communities University =

University in Suva, Fiji specializing in Pasifika education

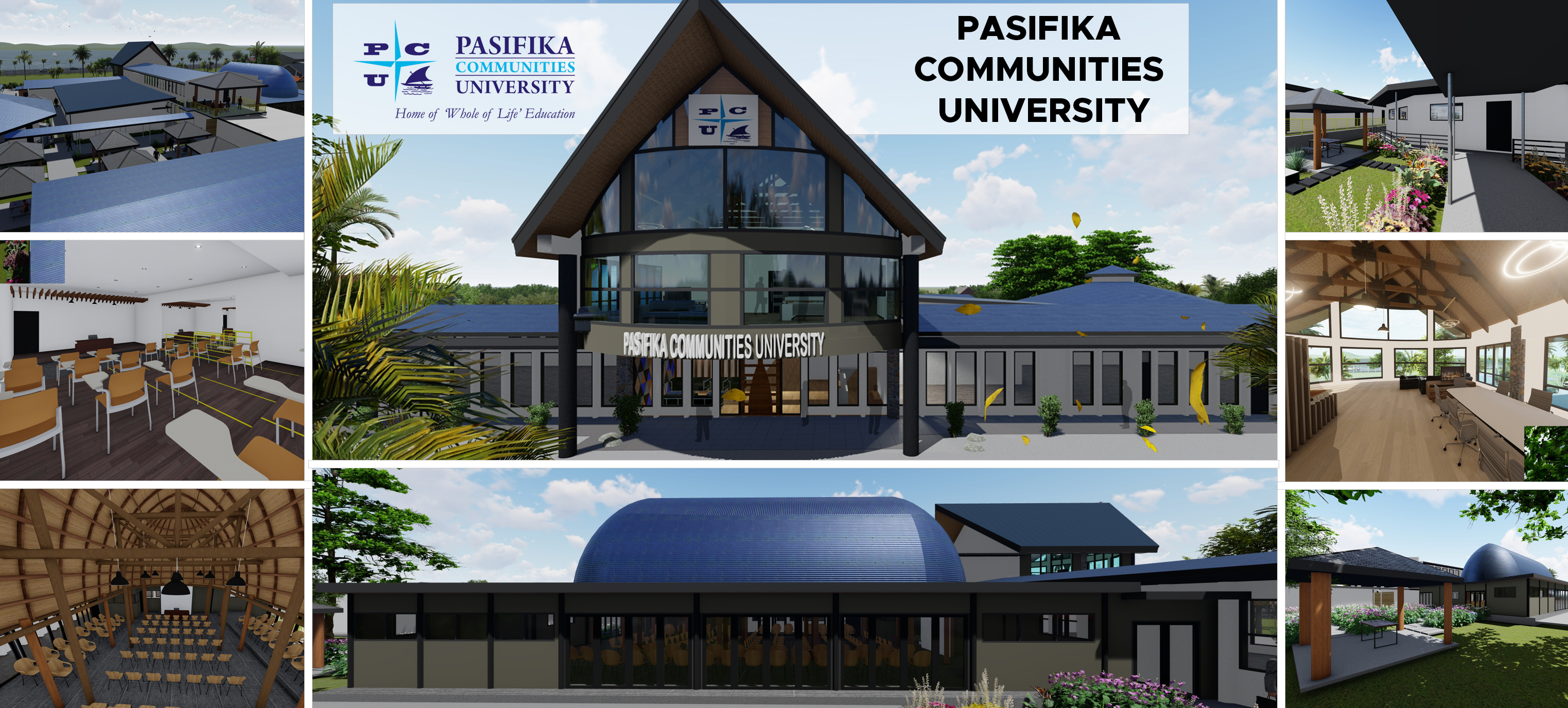
- PCU New Administration Block(Illustration)
- Type: Ecumenical
- Established: 1964 (as Pacific Theological College)
- Affiliations: Multiple Pacific Church Bodies
- Vice-Chancellor: Rev Prof. Upolu Luma Vaai
- Location: Suva, Fiji; 18.16°S 178.43°E
- Campus: 14 acres (5.7 ha); Urban
- Website: https://pcu.ac.fj
- Location in Fiji

Pasifika Communities University (PCU), formerly known as Pacific Theological College (PTC), is a regional university located in Suva, Fiji. It specializes in theological and contextual education with a focus on Indigenous Pasifika philosophies, community-based learning, and transformational education addressing social, cultural, and environmental challenges in the Pacific region.

== Beginnings ==
PCU's origins trace to the 1961 Conference of Churches and Missions in Malua, Samoa, and the Dudley House Consultation in Suva. It was legally registered as Pacific Theological College in 1964. The foundation stone was laid by Archbishop Rev. Dr. Michael Ramsey on 2 March 1965 at its current Suva location. The first principal, Dr. George F. Knight, led the inaugural 1965 student cohort. The campus officially opened on 9 June 1966. Its first students represented diverse Pacific nations, and the institution was the first regional center offering a Bachelor of Divinity degree.

== Transition to Pasifika Communities University (2020s) ==
Starting in 2019, under Rev Prof. Upolu Lumā Vaai, the institution transitioned to Pasifika Communities University with a focus on a "whole of life" education approach, integrating Indigenous wisdom, ecological sustainability, and social justice. New schools, research institutes, and academic programs were established, including the Institute for Climate Indigenous Knowledge and the Centre for Gender and Social Justice. The transition included governance reforms and infrastructure upgrades.
