= Evangelical Lutheran Church of Papua New Guinea =

Protestant church in Papua New Guinea

- Official logo of the Evangelical Lutheran Church of Papua New Guinea.
- Classification: Protestant
- Orientation: Lutheran
- Theology: Lutheran theology
- Polity: Episcopal
- Associations: World Council of Churches, Lutheran World Federation, Pacific Conference of Churches, Papua New Guinea Council of Churches
- Region: Papua New Guinea
- Congregations: 2000
- Members: 900,000 baptized
- Ministers: 2,800
- Hospitals: 12
- Primary schools: 170
- Secondary schools: 11
- Tertiary institutions: 6
- Official website: http://www.elcpng.org/
- Head Bishop - Rt. Rev. Jack Urame General Secretary - Bernard Kaisom Assistant Bishop - Rev. Lucas Kedabeng

The Evangelical Lutheran Church of Papua New Guinea is a Protestant church denomination located in Papua New Guinea that professes the Lutheran branch of the Christian faith. The Church is incorporated by a 1991 Act of the Parliament of Papua New Guinea and it has a baptized membership of approximately 900,000 members.

It is a member of the:

- Lutheran World Federation (LWF) (1976)
- World Council of Churches
- Pacific Conference of Churches
- and is in fellowship with the Lutheran Church of Australia.

== History ==
The Evangelical Lutheran Church of Papua New Guinea grew out of the work of the Neuendettelsau Mission Society (1886) and the Rhenish Missionary Society (1887), both from Germany. During World War II all missionaries left the area, and many mission stations, churches, schools and hospitals were damaged. In spite of this, the indigenous church leaders and local Christians stood firm in the work of the church. After the war the Lutheran churches in Australia and North America were asked to help reconstruct the church in Papua New Guinea, working together as the Lutheran Mission New Guinea. In 1956 expatriate missionaries and indigenous church leaders gathered and formed the present indigenous church. At the time of its founding the church was called Evangelical Lutheran Church of New Guinea (ELCONG), and its founding bishop was an expatriate missionary from the American Lutheran Church. The first indigenous bishop was elected in 1973. In 1975, on the eve of the country's independence, the name of the church was changed to Evangelical Lutheran Church of Papua New Guinea (ELCPNG). In 1977 the church was officially declared autonomous and another local Lutheran church organized by the Australian Lutheran Mission joined with the ELCPNG. It has long had close relations with the Gutnius Lutheran Church, largely in Enga Province, whose origins were American Lutheran Church–Missouri Synod, and shares clergy college in Lae.

== Aims and Beliefs ==
The ELCPNG believes that the church is the body of Christ on earth so that people can grow in faith and live as brothers and sisters. This function of the church is seen in the preaching of the gospel and the administration of the sacraments, bringing people closer to God so that they may inherit eternal life. The church teaches that the Holy Spirit enables and strengthens this work. The stated aims of the church are :

- to strengthen fellowship among members - koinonia
- to strengthen the practice of worship - liturgia
- to strengthen the work of evangelism - martyria
- to strengthen the work of holding fast to the word of God as proclaimed by the Apostles -
  theology and confession - theologia
- to strengthen the work of service and welfare - diakonia.

== Church Governance and Functions ==
The church has seven departments: evangelism, education, lands and properties, ministerial training, medical services, development services, finance. There are 17 districts divided according to geographical and population needs. Circuits cover smaller areas within the districts; within the circuits are the local parishes/congregations. The church runs 81 health centres, 224 primary schools, 18 high schools, 6 secondary schools, 3 community school one teacher training college, 3 nursing college, 5 girls' Bible schools, 3 seminaries and a training centre for evangelists.

== Literature ==
- Flierl, John: Forty-Five Years in New Guinea: Memoirs of the Senior Missionary. Translated by M. Wiederanders. Second and Revised Edition ed. The Lutheran Book Concern: Columbus, Ohio 1931. 204 pp.
- Flierl, Joh.: Christ in New Guinea: Former Cannibals Become Evangelists by the Marvellous Grace of God: A Short History of Missionwork Done by the Native Helpers and Teachers in the Lutheran Mission New Guinea. Auricht's Printing Office: Tanunda, S.A. 1932. 298 pp.
- Flierl, Johann: My Life and God's Mission: An Autobiography by Senior Johann Flierl: Pioneer Missionary and Field Inspector in New Guinea. Flierl, Erich, Editor & Translator. Board for Church Cooperation in World Mission, Lutheran Church of Australia: Adelaide 1999. 255 pp.
- Albert C. Frerichs: Anutu conquers in New Guinea, Wartburg Press: Columbus, Ohio 1957. 271 pp. + 1 map.
- Wendy Flannery: All Prophets: Revival Movements in the Catholic and Lutheran Churches in the Highlands. In: Catalyst 10 (1980) 229–257.
- Herwig Wagner - Hermann Reiner (eds.), The Lutheran Church in Papua New Guinea. The First Hundred Years 1886–1986, second printing, Lutheran Publishing House: Adelaide (Australia) 1987, 677 pp., ISBN 0-85910-382-X
- Brian Schwarz (ed.), An Introduction to Ministry in Melanesia. A Handbook for Church Workers, point Series No. 7, The Melanesian Institute, Goroka 1985, 304 pp.
- Rufus Pech, The Acts of the Apostles in Papua New Guinea and Solomon Islands, in: B. Schwarz (ed), An Introduction to Ministry in Melanesia, Point Series No. 7, The Melanesian Institute: Goroka, PNG 1985, 17–71.
- Gernot Fugmann, The Birth of an indigenous church : letters, reports and documents of Lutheran Christians of Papua New Guinea, Point series, no. 10, Melanesian Institute: Goroka, Papua New Guinea 1986.
- Herwig Wagner - Gernot Fugmann - Hermann Janssen (eds.), Papua Neuguinea. Geschichte und Kirche. Ein ökumenisches Handbuch, Verl. der Ev.Luth. Mission: Erlangen, 1989, 464 pp. + 16 Bildseiten, ISBN 3-87214-193-7
- Müller, Klaus Wilhelm: Peacemaker: Missionary Practice of Georg Friedrich Vicedom in New Guinea (1929–1939): A Presentation Based Mainly on His Own Writings. [Ph.D. Dissertation]. Aberdeen: University of Aberdeen; 1993. 27, 284, 7, 523 pp.
- Paul Steffen: Missionsbeginn in Neuguinea. Die Anfänge der Rheinischen, Neuendettelsauer und Steyler Missionsarbeit in Neuguinea. (Studia Instituti Missiologici S.V.D. - 61) Steyler Verlag, Nettetal 1995, ISBN 3-8050-0351-X.
- Heinrich Zahn, Mission and Music: Jabem Traditional Music and the Development of Lutheran Hymnody, translated by Philip W. Holzknecht, Edited by Don Niles, Institute of Papua New Guinea Studies, Boroko, Port Moresby (PNG) 1996, 492 pp., ISBN 9980-68-032-6.
- Traugott Farnbacher: Gemeinde verantworten : Anfänge, Entwicklungen und Perspektiven von Gemeinde und Ämtern der Evangelisch-Lutherischen Kirche von Papua-Neuguinea, LIT Verlag: Munster - Hamburg - London 1998, 500 pp., ISBN 3-8258-3848-X.
- Ian Breward: A History of the Churches in Australasia, (The Oxford History of Christian Churches), Oxford University Press, Oxford 2001, Reprinted 2008, 474 pp., ISBN 978-0-19-927592-2.
- Paul B. Steffen, Die katholischen Missionen in Deutsch-Neuguinea, in: H.J. Hiery (ed.), Die deutsche Südsee. Ein Handbuch, 2nd improved and enlarged edition 2002, Schöningh: Paderborn 2001, 343–383, ISBN 3-506-73912-3, 341-383.
- Rufus Pech: Deutsche evangelische Missionen in Deutsch-Neuguinea 1886–1921, : H.J. Hiery (ed.), Die deutsche Südsee. Ein Handbuch, 2nd improved and enlarged edition 2002, Schöningh: Paderborn 2001, 343–383, ISBN 3-506-73912-3, 384–416.
