= Postage stamps and postal history of the Marshall Islands =

This is a survey of the postage stamps and postal history of the Marshall Islands.

The Republic of the Marshall Islands (RMI) is a Micronesian nation of atolls and islands in the middle of the Pacific Ocean, just west of the International Date Line and just north of the Equator.

== Pre-independence ==
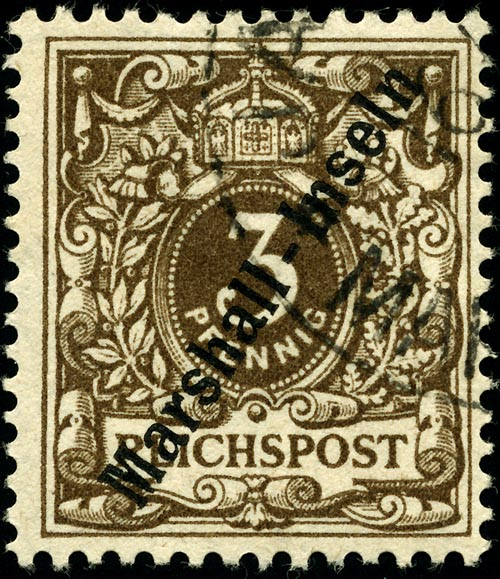
Overprinted German stamp for the Marshall Islands

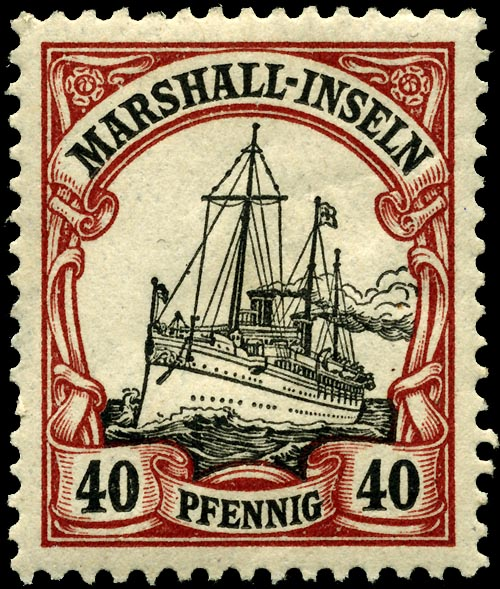
A 40-pfennig stamp of the German Yacht issue, 1901

The islands first used German stamps in 1888, with overprinted German stamps for the Marshall Islands becoming available in 1897. Stamps of German Marshall Islands were also valid in Nauru. After WWI, as part of mandated territory, stamps of Japan were used from 1914 to 1944. The islands became part of the United Nations Trust Territory of the Pacific in 1947 and used U.S. stamps until 1984.

== Independence ==
Marshall Islands has issued stamps since achieving postal independence in 1984.

== See also ==
- Postage stamps and postal history of the German colonies
- Postage stamps and postal history of Nauru
- Postage stamps and postal history of the Federated States of Micronesia
- Postage stamps and postal history of Palau
