= Postage stamps and postal history of the Caroline Islands =

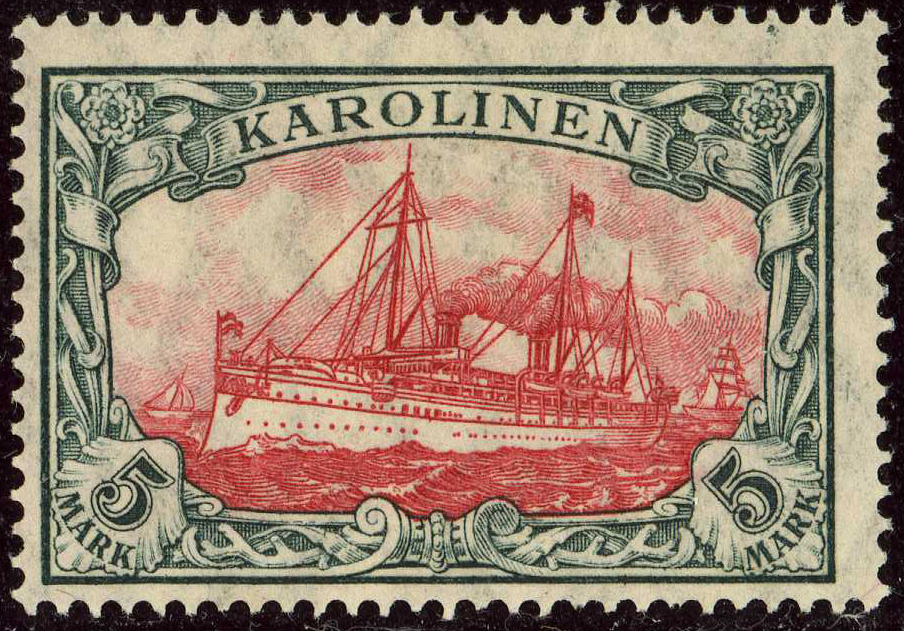
A 5 mark "Yacht" stamp, 1915 print for collectors

Early mail sent to and from the Caroline Islands was occasional and dependent on visiting ships.

== German control ==
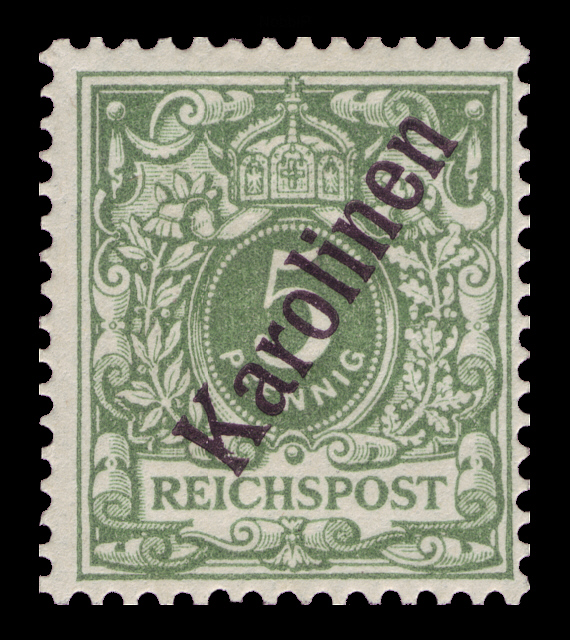
German stamp overprinted Karolinen, 1900

The Spanish authorities issued no postage stamps or postmarks for the islands. Germany rapidly set up a postal system once awarded the islands; having received the Carolines on 1 June 1899 as part of the German–Spanish Treaty (1899), on 12 October German stamps overprinted "Karolinen" were issued. At first, the overprint was angled at 48 degrees, then a few months later the angle of the text was changed to 56 degrees. Few examples of these, at either angle, survive today, especially in cancelled condition.

By 1900, Yap and Ponape were stops on a regular mail run between German New Guinea and Hong Kong. Initially, the service was operated by the Reich Mail Steamer Lines, with the help of government subsidies, then in 1902 the Jaluit Company took over.

These stamps are the subject of a fictional discussion between Erwin Rommel and one of the other characters in the movie Raid on Rommel

== Yacht stamps ==
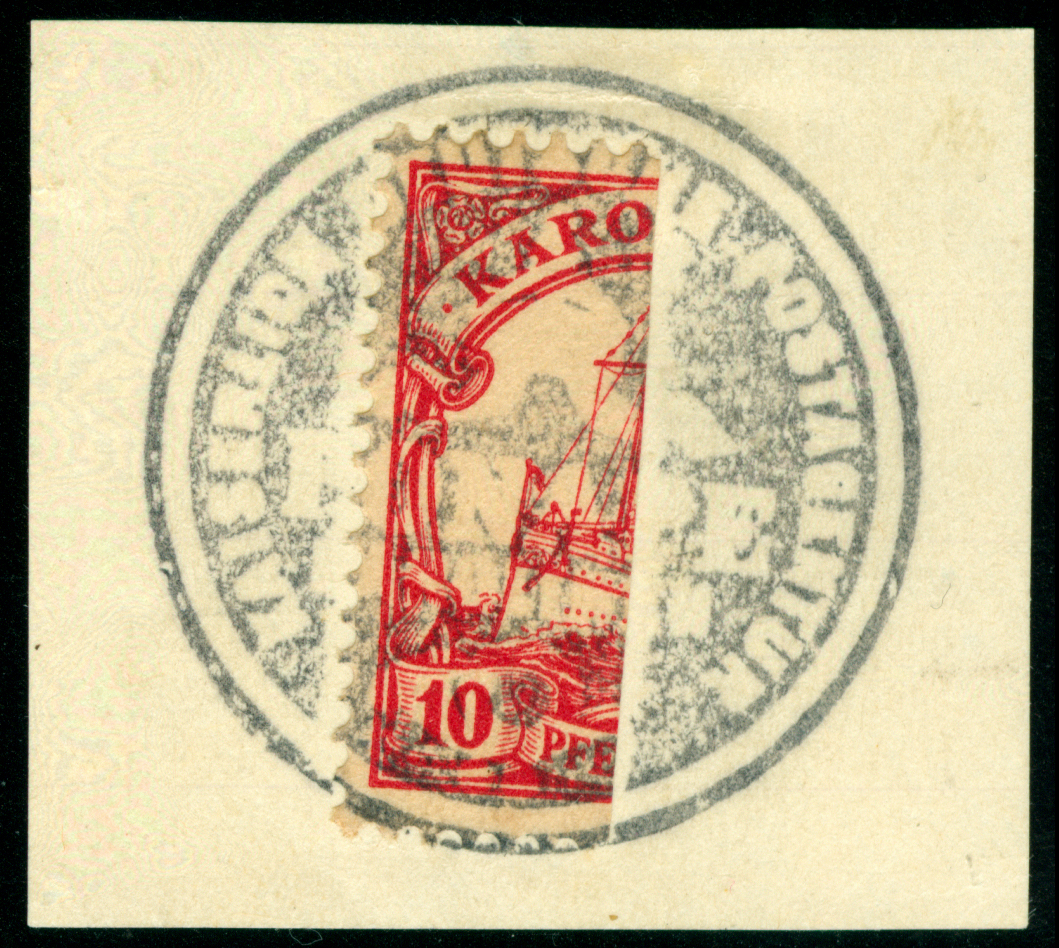
Bisected 10pf stamp

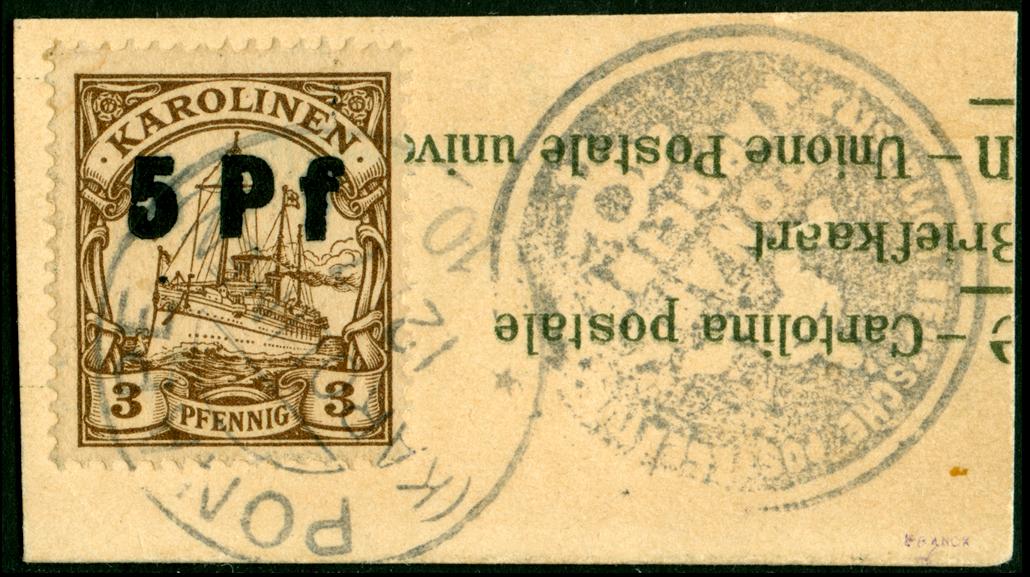
A surcharged 5pf stamp

In January 1901, Germany issued its Yacht stamps with a common design for all of Germany's colonies, featuring the Kaiser's yacht Hohenzollern. The issues for the Carolines featured the inscription "KAROLINEN", all with mark and pfennig denominations. Many unused copies of the low values still exist today, left over after the Japanese occupation, but as one might expect from the short period of German rule and the very small numbers of letter-writers living in the Carolines, genuinely used stamps are uncommon, typically priced 5–20 times higher than unused.

In 1905 the stock of 5pf stamps was destroyed in a typhoon, and 10pf stamps were bisected. Another shortage in 1910 resulted in bisects of 20pf stamps, and 3pf stamps surcharged to 5pf.

== Japanese occupation ==
Japan occupied the islands in October 1914, after which Japanese stamps were used until the end of World War II. Germany printed Yacht stamps for the Carolines as late as 1919, on paper with lozenge watermarks, but none were ever used on mail.

The islands became part of the U.S. Trust Territory of the Pacific in 1944 and used U.S. stamps until 1983.

== See also ==
- Postage stamps and postal history of the Federated States of Micronesia
- Postage stamps and postal history of Palau

== Bibliography ==
- Rossiter, Stuart & John Flower. The Stamp Atlas. London: Macdonald, 1986. ISBN 0-356-10862-7
- Scott catalogue
