= Postage stamps and postal history of Togo =

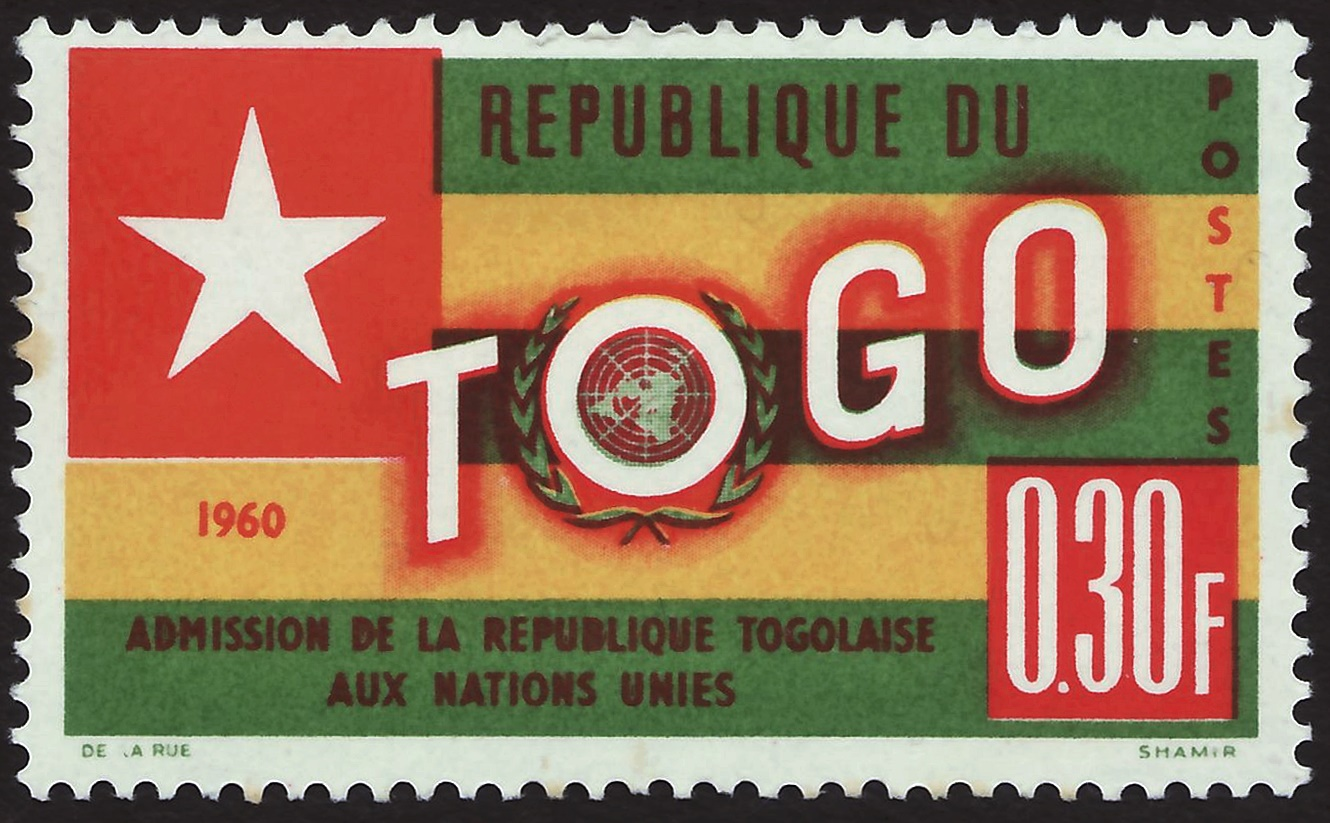
Stamp of Togo, 1961

This is a survey of the postage stamps and postal history of Togo.

Togo is a country in West Africa bordered by Ghana to the west, Benin to the east and Burkina Faso to the north. It extends south to the Gulf of Guinea, on which the capital Lomé is located. Togo covers an area of approximately 57,000 square kilometres (22,000 sq mi) with a population of approximately 6.7 million.

== Pre-stamp era ==
The first posts in Togo were established by German traders in the 1880s who operated from the coastal towns and used German West African mail boats. Mail entered the German postal system at Hamburg. There were 17 German post offices before the 1914 invasion.

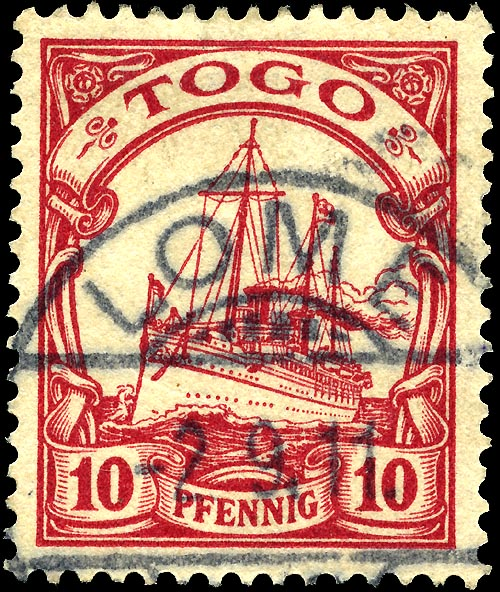
A German key type stamp for Togo, postmarked LOME 1911

== German stamps ==
The first stamps used in German Togo were unoverprinted stamps of Germany used at "Klein-Popo" from 1 March 1888 and at "Lome" from 1 March 1890. They may be recognised by the cancellations used. Beginning in June 1897, German stamps with "Togo" overprint were made available. In November 1900, the key type stamps known as the Yacht issue were introduced. Water-marked versions of "Yachts" became standard in 1909, and they remained in use until the First World War.

== Allied occupation ==
In August 1914, Togo was invaded by British and French troops which occupied the territory until 1919. The German post office was closed and the occupying forces used German stamps at first, with "Anglo-French Occupation" overprints. From 1915, overprinted British stamps of the Gold Coast and overprinted French stamps of Dahomey were in use. The country was divided into two zones during the occupation with the east bordering Dahomey, a French territory, being run by the French and the west, bordering the British Gold Coast, being run by the British.

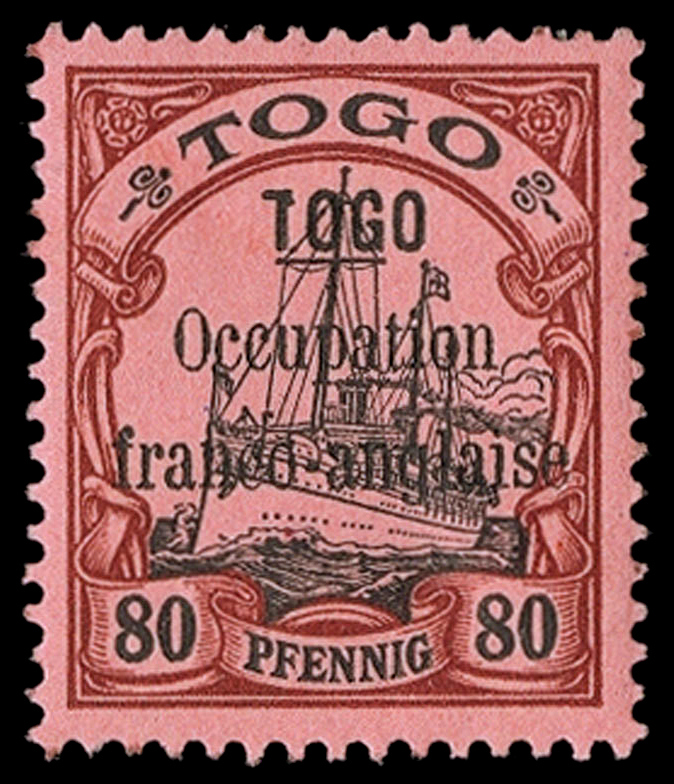
Stamp of German Togo overprinted by the French occupation forces

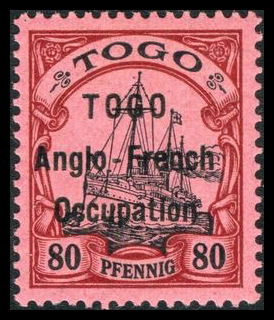
Stamp of German Togo overprinted by the British occupation forces

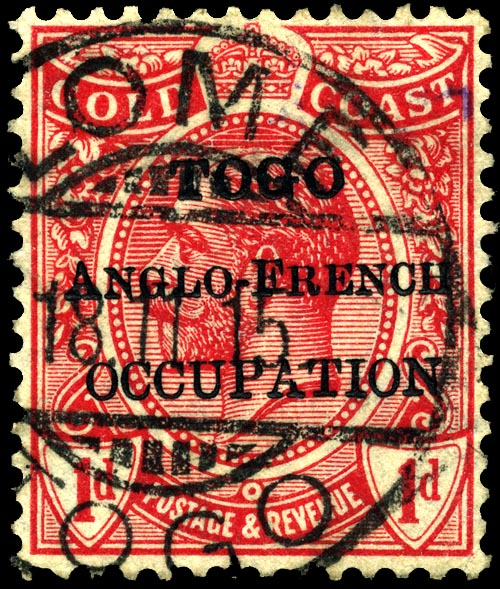
A stamp of Gold Coast overprinted for use in the British zone of occupied Togo

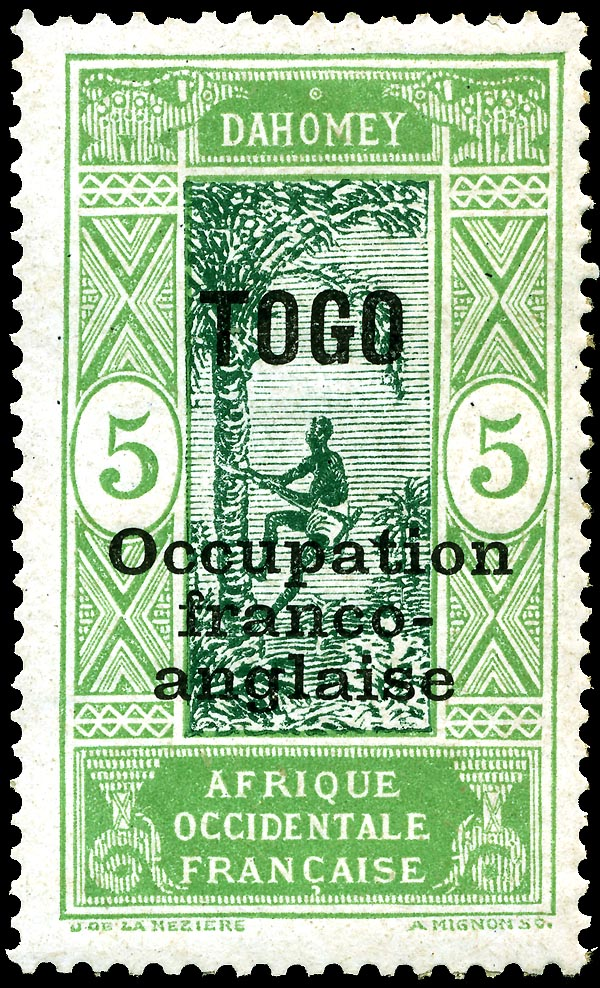
A French colonial stamp of Dahomey overprinted for use in the French zone of occupied Togo

== After 1918 ==
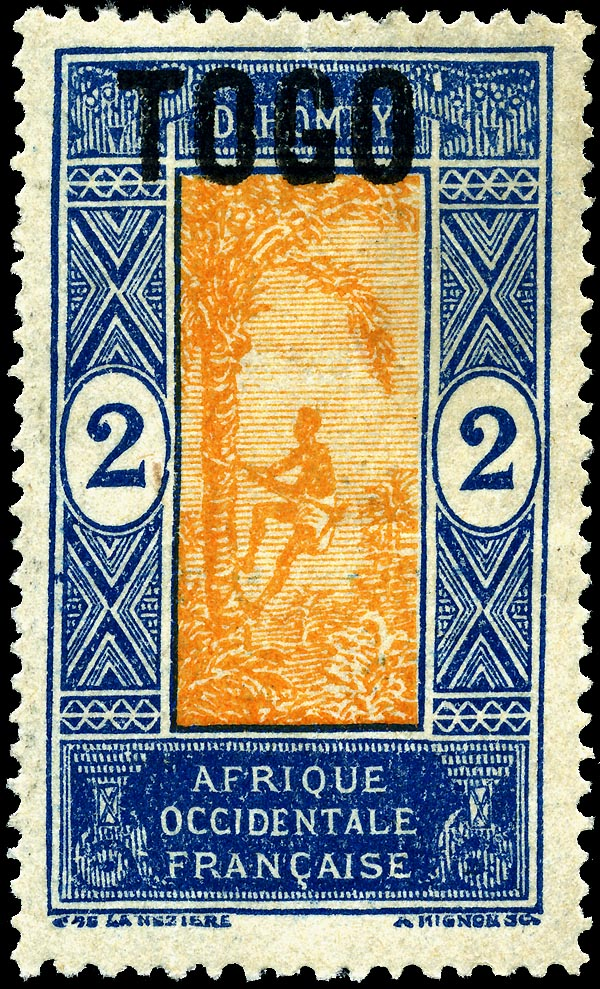
A French colonial stamp of Dahomey overprinted for use in French Togoland, 1921

In 1922 The League of Nations confirmed the division of the territory into two Mandate territories of British Togoland and French Togoland.

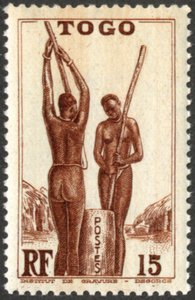
Stamp of French Togoland, 1940

French Togoland issued its first set of stamps in 1921, overprinting stamps of French Dahomey. In 1955 French Togoland was made an autonomous republic within the French community.

British Togoland was administered as part of the adjoining territory of the Gold Coast, and used stamps of Gold Coast. A plebiscite was held in 1956 resulting in British Togoland being merged with Gold Coast, making Togo the tall, thin, country it is today, and enlarging the current Ghana.

== Independence ==
Togo became independent on 27 April 1960 and joined the Universal Postal Union on 21 March 1962. Togo was one of the first clients of the Inter-Governmental Philatelic Corporation.

== See also ==
- Postage stamps and postal history of the German colonies
- West Africa Study Circle
