= South West African Class Hd =

Locomotive class

GSWA Class Hd 2-8-2 South West African Class Hd 2-8-2 South African Class NG5 2-8-2
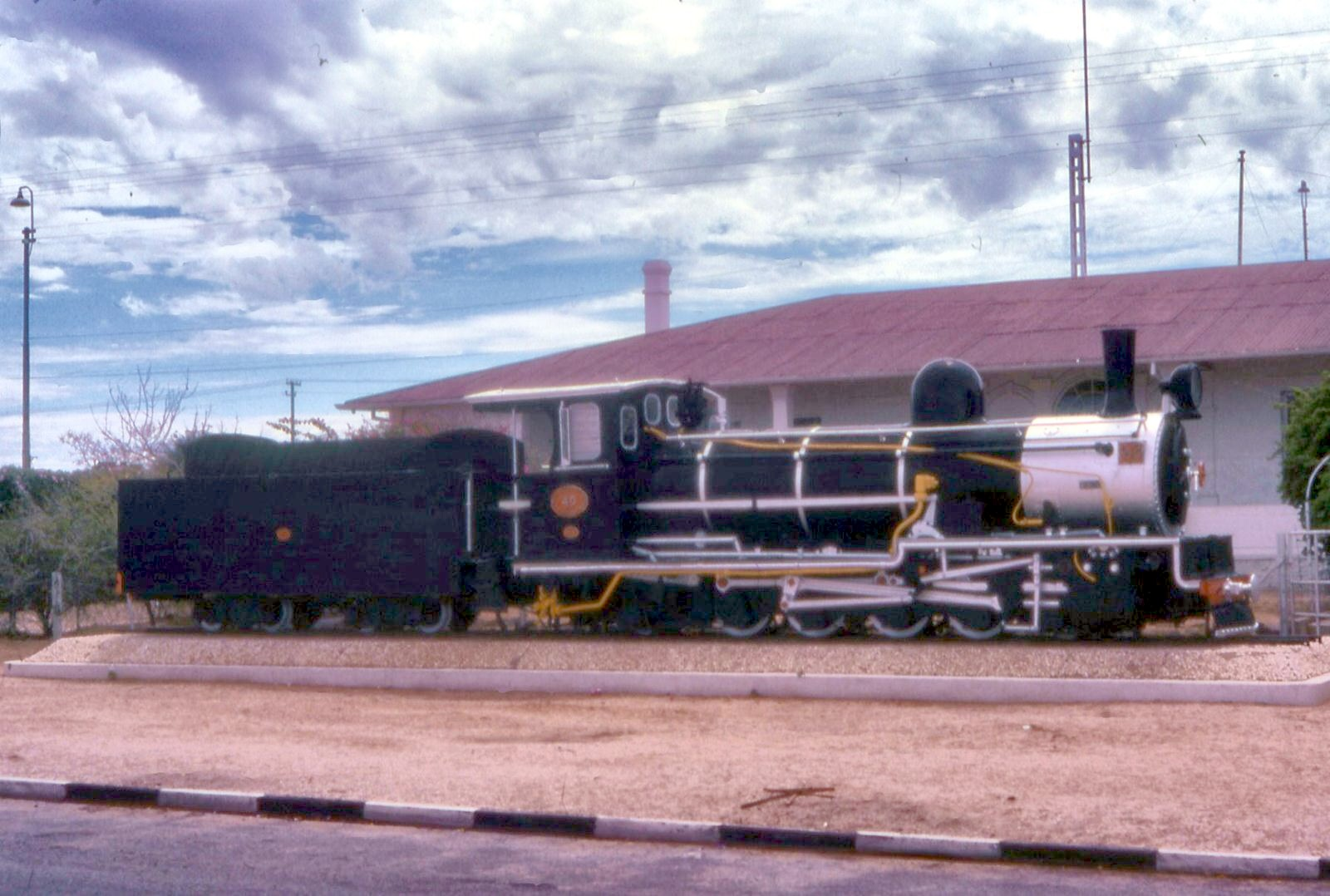
- No. 40 plinthed at Usakos, May 1984
Type and origin
- Power type: Steam
- Designer: Henschel and Son
- Builder: Henschel and Son
- Serial number: 10720-10722
- Model: Class Hd
- Build date: 1912
- Total produced: 3
Specifications
- Configuration
  - Whyte: 2-8-2
  - UIC: 1D1h2
- Driver: 3rd coupled axle
- Gauge: 600 mm (1 ft 11 5/8 in) narrow
- Leading dia.: 21 21/32 in (550 mm)
- Coupled dia.: 33 7/8 in (860 mm)
- Trailing dia.: 21 21/32 in (550 mm)
- Tender wheels: 20 1/2 in (521 mm)
- Wheelbase: 38 ft 6 5/8 in (11,751 mm)
  - Axle spacing (Asymmetrical): 1-2: 3 ft 1 7/16 in (951 mm); 2-3: 3 ft 4 1/8 in (1,019 mm); 3-4: 3 ft 1 7/16 in (951 mm)
  - Engine: 17 ft 11/16 in (5,199 mm)
  - Coupled: 9 ft 7 in (2,921 mm)
  - Tender: 11 ft 5 3/4 in (3,499 mm)
  - Tender bogie: 3 ft 3 3/8 in (1,000 mm)
- Length
  - Over couplers: 49 ft 9 1/4 in (15,170 mm)
- Height: 10 ft 9 15/16 in (3,300 mm)
- Frame type: Plate
- Loco weight: 32 LT 17 cwt (33,380 kg)
- Tender weight: 25 LT 11 cwt 3 qtr (26,000 kg)
- Total weight: 58 LT 8 cwt 3 qtr (59,380 kg)
- Tender type: 2-axle bogies
- Fuel type: Coal
- Fuel capacity: 2 LT 17 cwt (2.9 t)
- Water cap.: 2,860 imp gal (13,000 L)
- Firebox
  - Type: Round-top
  - Grate area: 16.7 sq ft (1.55 m^{2})
- Boiler
  - Pitch: 5 ft 8 7/8 in (1,749 mm)
  - Diameter: 3 ft 11 3/4 in (1,213 mm)
  - Tube plates: 13 ft 1 1/2 in (4,000 mm)
  - Small tubes: 114: 1 3/4 in (44 mm)
  - Large tubes: 12: 4 23/32 in (120 mm)
- Boiler pressure: 171 psi (1,179 kPa)
- Heating surface
  - Firebox: 68 sq ft (6.3 m^{2})
  - Tubes: 900 sq ft (84 m^{2})
  - Total surface: 968 sq ft (89.9 m^{2})
- Superheater
  - Heating area: 169 sq ft (15.7 m^{2})
- Cylinders: Two
- Cylinder size: 15 3/4 in (400 mm) bore 17 3/4 in (451 mm) stroke
- Valve gear: Heusinger
- Valve type: Piston
- Loco brake: Air
- Train brakes: Air & vacuum
- Couplers: Buffer-and-chains
Performance figures
- Tractive effort: 16,610 lbf (73.9 kN) @ 75%
Career
- Operators: Otavi Mining and Railway Co. South African Railways
- Class: GSWA Class Hd, SAR Class NG5
- Number in class: 3
- Numbers: SW40-SW42
- Delivered: 1912
- First run: 1912
- Withdrawn: 1960

The South West African Class Hd 2-8-2 of 1912 was a narrow gauge steam locomotive from the German South West Africa era.

In 1912, the German administration in German South West Africa acquired three Class Hd tender locomotives with a 2-8-2 "Mikado" wheel arrangement, for lease to the Otavi Mining and Railway Company to use on the line from Swakopmund to Karibib. When these locomotives were taken onto the roster of the South African Railways after the First World War, they retained their German classification and engine numbers, but with an "SW" prefix to their numbers.

When a system of grouping narrow gauge locomotives into classes was eventually introduced by the South African Railways, they were designated Class NG5 along with similar locomotives which were placed in service by the South African Railways in 1922.

== Manufacturer ==
Increasing traffic demands arising from the copper mines at Tsumeb led to a requirement for more locomotives. Three narrow gauge 2-8-2 steam locomotives were built for the German administration in German South West Africa (GSWA) by Henschel and Son in Germany in 1912. They were designated Class Hd, numbered in the range from 40 to 42, and leased to the Otavi Mining and Railway Company for use on the section between Swakopmund and Karibib.

The "Hd" classification identified the locomotive type as the fourth class to have been built for GSWA by Henschel.

== Characteristics ==
The locomotives were superheated, with Heusinger valve gear, piston valves and outside plate frames. Since they were to be used across the Namib Desert, they were equipped with dust covers to protect the motion from wind-blown sand. Their leading and trailing carrying wheels were not mounted in separate bogie trucks, but were rigidly mounted and arranged as radial axles to allow for sideways motion of the wheels in relation to the locomotive frame. This resulted in a rigid wheelbase of 17 feet 11/16 inch (5,199 millimetres), even though the leading carrying wheels were arranged to the rear instead of ahead of the cylinders.

As built, the sand boxes were mounted on top of the boiler aft of the dome. Their tenders, also built by Henschel, rode on two four-wheeled bogies and had a coal capacity of 2 long tons 17 hundredweight (2.9 tonnes) and a water capacity of 2,860 imperial gallons (13,000 litres). The engines were equipped for trains with air brakes, which was not yet in use in South Africa at the time.

== South African Railways ==
After the First World War, when the former German colony came under South African administration and all railway operations in South West Africa (SWA) were taken over by the South African Railways (SAR) in 1922, these locomotives retained their Hd classification and engine numbers, but with an "SW" prefix to the numbers. This was to prevent confusion with the two Class NG1 narrow gauge locomotives of the SAR which were numbered NG40 and NG41.

In SAR service, the locomotives were also equipped with vacuum train brakes.

== Reclassification ==
A system of grouping narrow gauge locomotives into classes was only adopted by the SAR somewhere between 1928 and 1930 and at that point these three locomotives, along with six similar locomotives which were built to a revised design and placed in service by the SAR in SWA in 1922, were all designated Class NG5. The original three locomotives retained their original German engine numbers, but the SW prefix was done away with since the two Class NG1 locomotives with duplicate engine numbers were being withdrawn from service at the time.

== Service ==
They remained on the SWA for their entire working lives, and all were withdrawn when the 2 ft gauge lines of the SWA system were widened to Cape gauge in 1960. Since they were unsuitable for use on the 2 ft line in the Langkloof, all six of the 1922 vintage Class NG5 locomotives were scrapped in 1962.

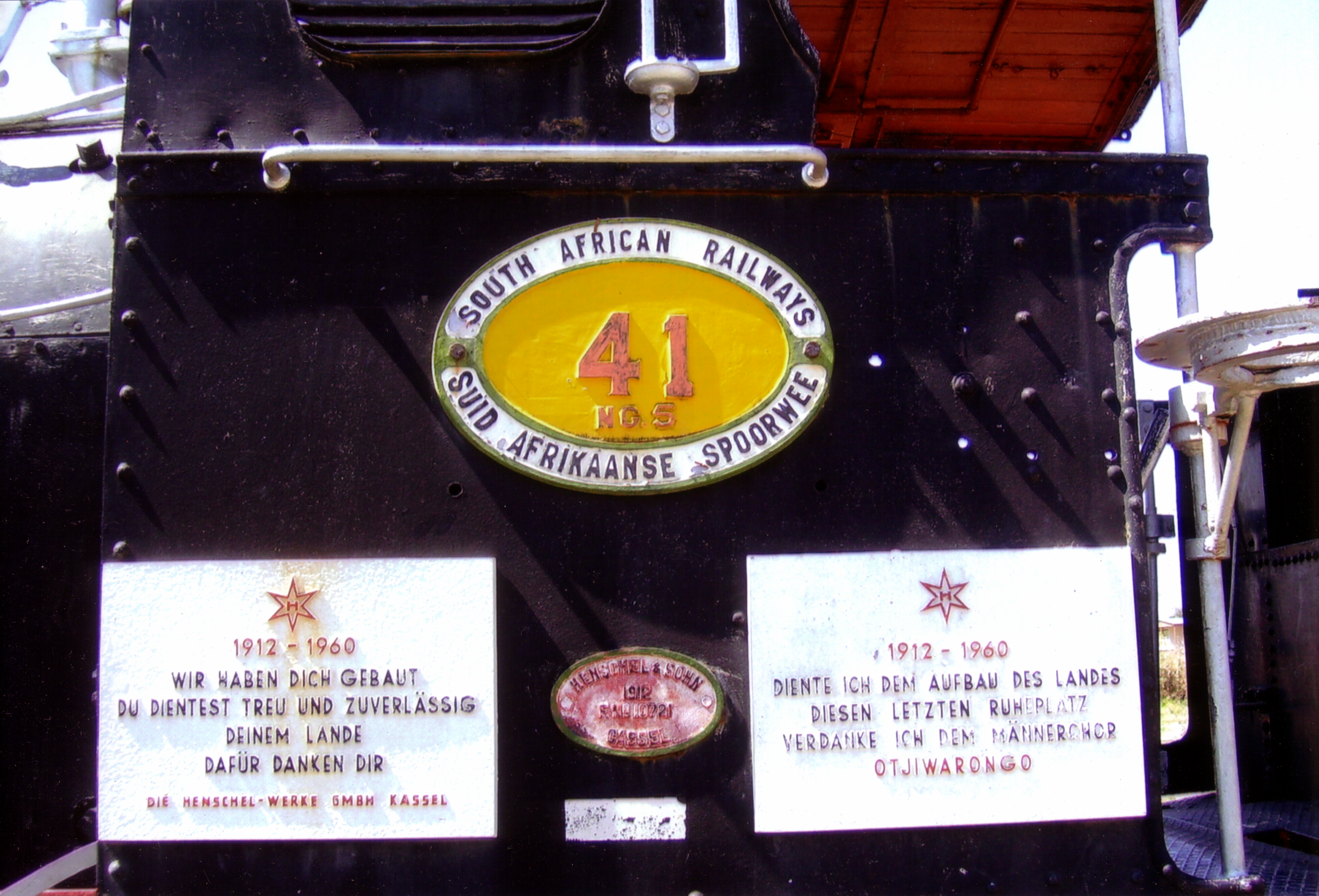
Number plate and plaques on No. 41, Otjiwarongo, 2011

Two of the 1912 ex-Class Hd locomotives were preserved. No. 40 was plinthed on the Usakos railway station platform while No. 41 was plinthed outside Otjiwarongo railway station.

== Commemoration ==
A postage stamp depicting the Class Hd locomotive was one of a set of four commemorative South West African postage stamps which were issued on 2 August 1985 to commemorate the narrow gauge locomotives which pioneered railways in the territory. The stamp design was by the noted stamp designer and artist Koos van Ellinckhuijzen.

== Illustration ==
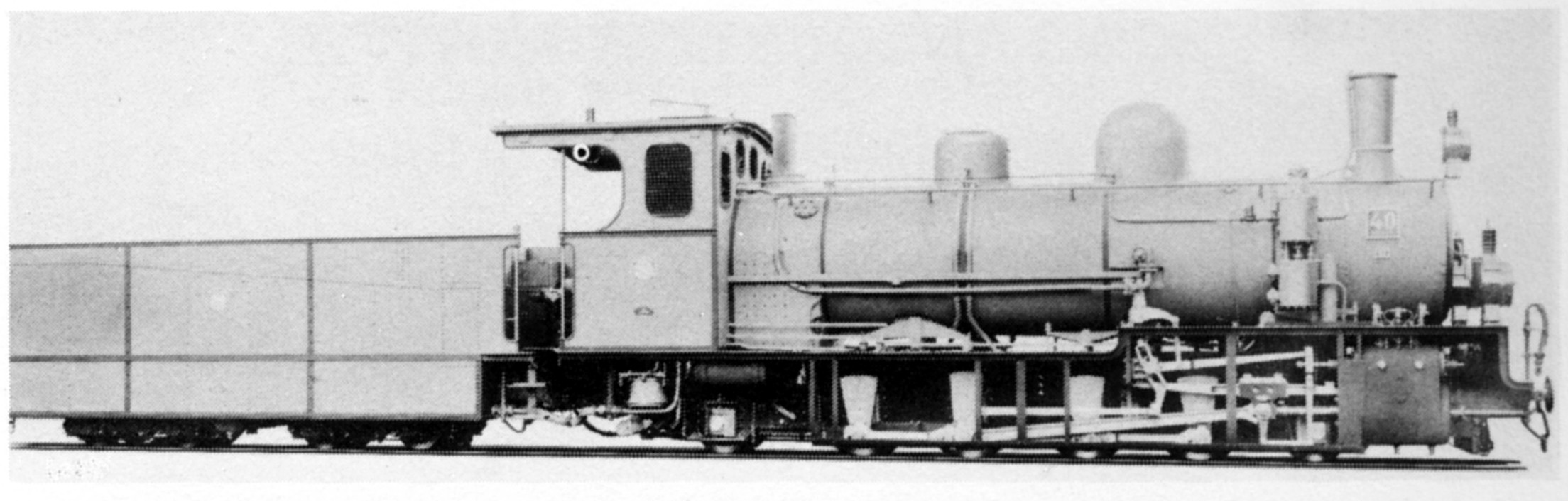
Works picture of Class Hd no. 40, c. 1912
