= Postage stamps and postal history of Palau =

1983 Inauguration of Palau Postal Service issue

This is a survey of the postage stamps and postal history of Palau.

The Republic of Palau is an island nation in the Pacific Ocean, 500 miles east of the Philippines and 2,000 miles south of Tokyo, forming the westernmost part of the Caroline Islands.

== Pre-independence ==
The islands first used German colonial issues for the Caroline Islands, and then stamps of Japan from 1914 to 1944. Palau became part of the U.S. Trust Territory of the Pacific in 1947 and used U.S. stamps until 1983.

== Independence ==
The first of Palau's stamps was issued in 1983 after gaining postal independence.

== Captain Wilson's Voyage Bicentennial ==
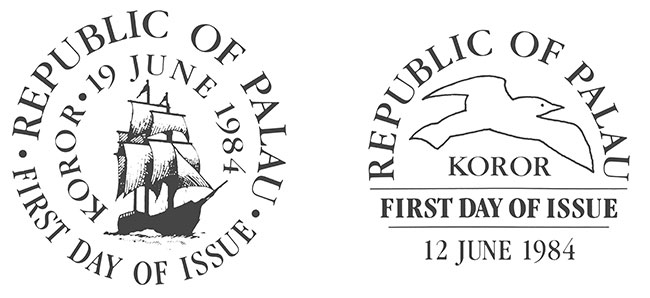
Original stamp cancellation marks for the bicentenary se-tenant stamp set

The inspiration for these unusual bicentenary stamps came from George Keate's 18th-century book, Account of the Pelew Islands. Polly Cianciolo's research led to George Keate's rare book which pictured many Palau scenes dating back to the time when the islands were discovered. The stamp concept tells the story of the August 9, 1783, accidental discovery of the Islands when the English Captain Wilson shipwrecked the East India Company's packet, Antelope.

The Antelope wreck off the coast of Palau, led to the first recorded encounter, both extended and harmonious, between Palauans and Europeans. This discovery is the theme of Palau's first postage stamp set. This se-tenant set of two blocks of four stamps, issued in 1983 were designed by New York City designer, Rosemary De Figlio and printed by House of Questa, a security printer in Great Britain. She used a selection of engravings from Keate's 18th-century book, Account of the Pelew Islands. De Figlio also illustrated the cameo of the Antelope that appears on every one of the eight unique stamps. The Palau discovery story is detailed in a December 15, 1983, article found in Great Britain's Weekly Stamp Paper, "STAMP COLLECTING", titled, "Captain Wilson's Voyage", by Barbara Last. That same publication's front cover featured an image of some of the stamps in color. The se-tenant stamp set received positive reviews from around the world.

In addition, there are two original cancellation marks shown here - KOROR 12 June 1984 and Republic of Palau 19 June 1984 with a drawing of the Antelope. Both cancellation marks were designed and illustrated by Rosemary De Figlio.

== See also ==
- Postage stamps and postal history of the Caroline Islands
- Postage stamps and postal history of the German colonies
- Postage stamps and postal history of the Federated States of Micronesia
- Postage stamps and postal history of the Marshall Islands
