= Postage stamps and postal history of German South West Africa =

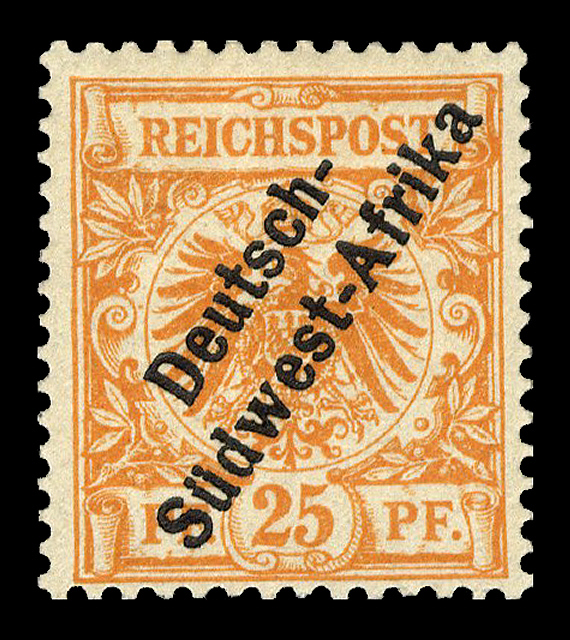
Overprint with hyphen, 1897

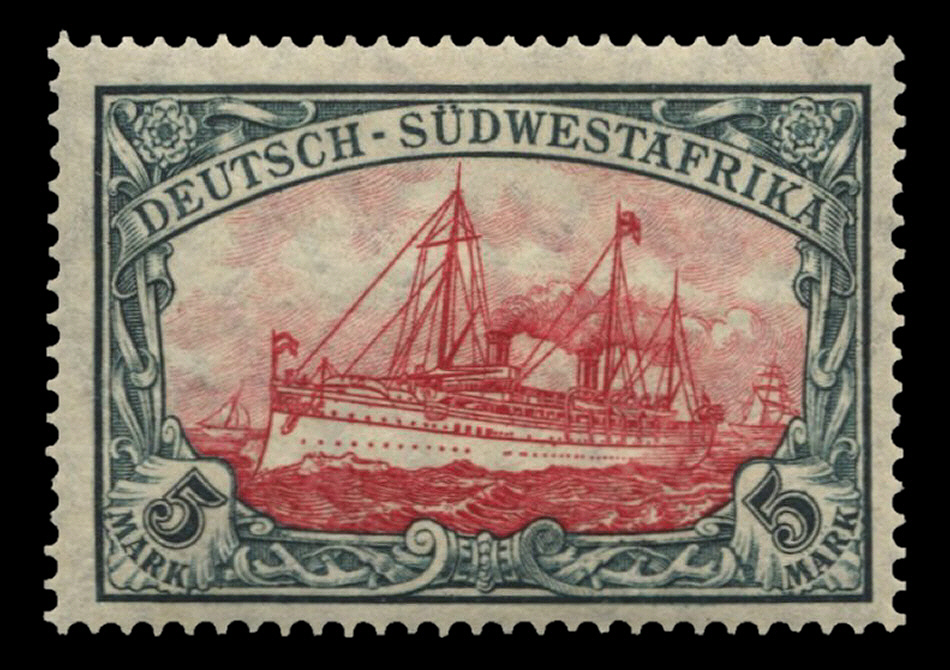
5-mark "Yacht", 1906

German South West Africa was a German colony in Africa, established in 1884 with the protection of the area around Lüderitz and abandoned during World War I, when the area was taken over by the British.

The postal history of the colony started on 7 July 1888 at Otjimbingwe, when the regular postal service began using German postage stamps and postmarks reading OTYIMBINGUE. The service continued in this fashion for a number of years, eventually expanding to additional post offices in Windhoek (1891) and Swakopmund (1895).

== First stamps ==
The first stamp issue for the colony consisted of overprints applied to German stamps in May 1897, reading "Deutsch- / Südwest-Afrika" at an angle. On 15 November 1898, the overprint was changed to "Deutsch- / Südwestafrika" dropping the hyphen.

== Yacht issue ==
In 1900, the omnibus Yacht issue included stamps for South West Africa, printed on watermarked paper after 1906. The last of these was a 3 Mark value, printed in 1919, but never put on sale in the colony. Some values, such as the 3 and 5 Pfennig Yachts, are readily available today, with prices of around US$1. The others range up to several hundred dollars. The high values of the watermarked Yachts saw very little usage before the colony was captured, and genuinely used stamps are up to 10 times more valuable; but many of the used stamps are known to have forged cancellations.

== See also ==
- Postage stamps and postal history of the German colonies
- Postage stamps and postal history of Namibia
- Postage stamps and postal history of South West Africa

== References and sources ==
Sources

- Scott catalogue

== Bibliography ==
- Gottspenn, Arno and Lutz Grimmer. Die Deutsche Westafrika-Schiffspost 1885–1956: Handbuch und Katalog. Hamburg: A. Gottspenn, 1988 557p.
- Koch, Bernhard. Deutsch-Sudwest-Afrika: "Feldpost" auf Seeposten, 1904–1907. Hamburg: Arbeitsgemeinschaft der Sammler Deutscher Kolonialpostwertzeichen und der Arbeitsgemeinschaft Schiffspost im Bund Deutscher Philatelisten e.V., 1981 67p.
- Mallet-Veale, H. South-West Africa: a check list. London: Harris Publications Ltd., 1928 43p. (= "Philatelic Magazine" handbook; no. 12).
- Mantei, Sebastian. Von der "Sandbüchse" zum Post- und Telegraphenland: der Aufbau des Kommunikationsnetzwerks in Deutsch-Südwestafrika 1884–1915. Windhoek: Namibia Wissenschaftliche Gesellschaft, 2007 ISBN 999164069X 246p.
- Putzel, Ralph F. The Comprehensive Handbook of the Postmarks of German South West Africa/South West Africa/Namibia. Tokai, South Africa: R.F. Putzel, 1991 600p.
- Quik, W.J. De postzegels van Zuidwest Afrika, de Verenigde Naties veranderde in 1968 de naam in Nambibië: 1884–1990. Krimpen a/d Ijssel: Filatelistenvereniging Zuidelijk Afrika, 2005 ISBN 90-807654-2-2 353p.
- Quik, W.J. and J. Stolk. De Postwaardestukken van Zuid-West Afrika 1888–1990 = The Postal Stationery of South West Africa 1888–1990. Rotterdam: Filatelistenvereniging Zuideijk Afrika, 2003 ISBN 90-803152-0-6 145p.
- Rust, Hans Joachim. Südwestafrika. Bayreuth: Schwarz, 1963 40p.
- The South African Stamp Colour Catalogue 2019–20. 36th ed. Johannesburg: International Philatelic Service, 2019 406p.
- Vogenbeck, Peter. Dienstsiegel und feldpostkarten von Deutsch-Südwestafrika: Official cancellations & field post cards of German South West Africa. Kalenborn-Scheuern: P. Vogenbeck, 1996 60p.
- Vogenbeck, Peter. Nebenstempel und Dienstsiegel von Deutsch-Südwestafrika: mit einer Abhandlung über Feldpostkarten und die Stempel der Eisenbahn: Cancellations of German South West Africa, with field post & railway marks. Kalenborn-Scheuern: P. Vogenbeck, 1999 299p.
- Vogenbeck, Peter. Soldatenbrief-Stempel von Deutsch-Sudwestafrika 1904-08. Kalenborn-Scheuern: P. Vogenbeck, 1994 44p.
- Vogenbeck, Peter and Eugen Pauls. Die Adlerstempel von Deutsch-Sudwestafrika. Kalenborn-Scheuern: The Authors, 1995 60p.
