= Postage stamps and postal history of the Federated States of Micronesia =

The first stamps of the FSM, issued 1984

This is a survey of the postage stamps and postal history of the Federated States of Micronesia (FSM).

The Federated States of Micronesia are located in the Caroline Islands in the western Pacific Ocean and consist of over 600 islands.

== Pre-independence ==
The islands first used stamps of Germany for the Caroline Islands and then stamps of Japan from 1914 to 1946. The islands then became part of the United Nations Trust Territory of the Pacific and used American stamps from 1946.

== Independence ==
The first stamps of independent Micronesia were issued in 1984 and depicted the four federated states that make up the country, Yap, Chuuk, Pohnpei and Kosrae, in a se-tenant design.

The FSM Postal Service delivers to and picks up mail from retail customers. As part of the special relationship with the United States, the United States Postal Service transports mail between the constituent states of the FSM and between the United States and the FSM. The FSM is also part of the United States ZIP code system, with the same postal rates charged.

== See also ==
- Postage stamps and postal history of the German colonies
- Postage stamps and postal history of the Marshall Islands
- Postage stamps and postal history of Palau
