= Postage stamps and postal history of Nauru =

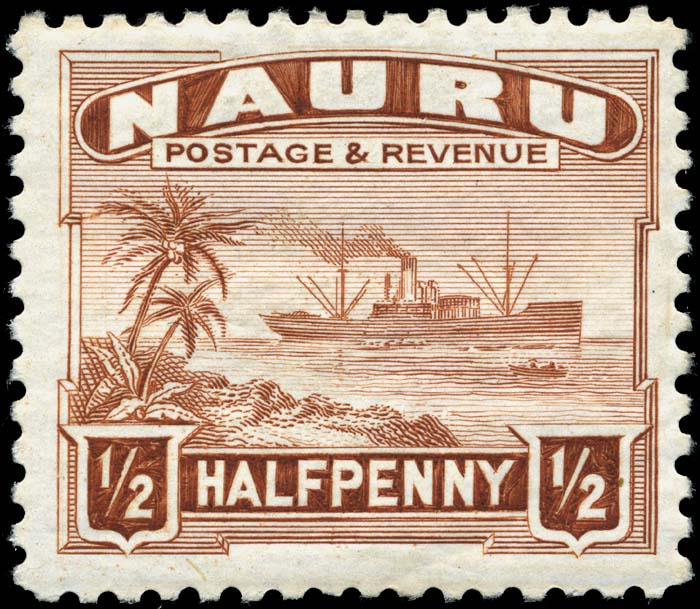
A 1924 half penny stamp of Nauru

This is a survey of the postage stamps and postal history of Nauru.

The Republic of Nauru is an island country in Micronesia in the South Pacific. Its nearest neighbour is Banaba Island in Kiribati, 300 kilometres (186 mi) to the east.

== Pre-independence ==
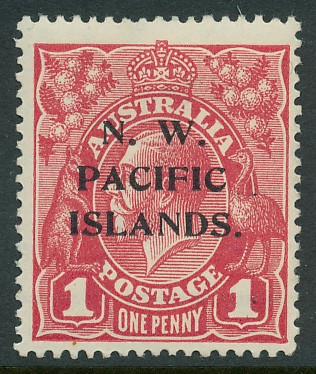
Stamp of Australia overprinted "North West Pacific Islands"

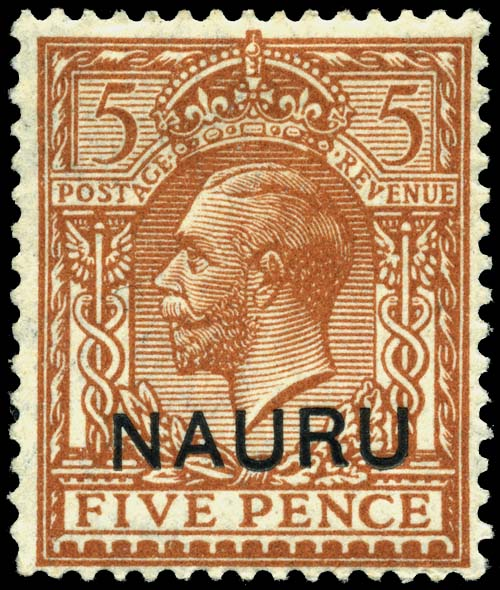
A British 1916 stamp overprinted for use in Nauru

As part of German Marshall Islands Protectorate, the first post office on the island opened in 1905 using stamps of German Marshall Islands. Following the outbreak of World War I, Nauru was occupied by Australian forces and Australian stamps overprinted North West Pacific Islands were used from 1914 to 1916. The British government then took control of the island and British stamps overprinted NAURU were issued in October 1916. From 1924, stamps were issued for Nauru as a mandated territory, then as a trust territory after WWII.

== Independence ==
The first stamps of independent Nauru were issued in 1968. In 2018 the Naoero postal services corporation act 2018, established a new postal system with Naoero postal services corporation (Nauru Post) serving as the republic of Nauru's official national postal and logistics provider.

== See also ==
- Postage stamps and postal history of the Marshall Islands
- Nauru Post - Official postal website
