= SMY Hohenzollern =

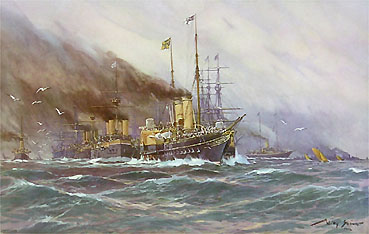
- Imperial Yacht Hohenzollern I (Willy Stöwer, ca. 1888)

History

German Empire
- Name: S.M.Y. Hohenzollern I
- Builder: Norddeutsche Schiffbau-Gesellschaft, Kiel
- Laid down: 1876
- Launched: 1878
- Renamed: Kaiseradler 1892
- Fate: Scrapped in 1912

German Empire
- Name: S.M.Y. Hohenzollern II
- Builder: AG Vulcan Stettin
- Launched: 27 June 1892
- In service: 1893
- Out of service: 1920
- Fate: Scrapped in 1923

German Empire
- Name: S.M.Y. Hohenzollern III
- Launched: September 1914
- Fate: Scrapped in 1923
- Notes: Never finished

General characteristics SMY Hohenzollern I
- Type: Royal Yacht
- Displacement: 6,821 t (6,713 long tons) standard; 7,718 t (7,596 long tons) full load
- Length: 88 m (288 ft 9 in)
- Beam: 17.7 m (58 ft 1 in)
- Draft: 4.8 m (15 ft 9 in)
- Propulsion: Triple-expansion steam engine

General characteristics SMY Hohenzollern II
- Type: Royal Yacht
- Length: 120 m (393 ft 8 in)
- Beam: 14 m (45 ft 11 in)
- Propulsion: Triple-expansion steam engine
- Notes: The ship became property of the Weimar Republic

SMY Hohenzollern (German: Seiner Majestät Yacht Hohenzollern) was the name of several yachts used by the German Emperors between 1878 and 1918, named after their House of Hohenzollern.

== History ==
=== SMY Hohenzollern I ===
The first Hohenzollern was built 1876–1878 by Norddeutsche Schiffbau-Gesellschaft in Kiel. Her interiors were designed by architect Heinrich Moldenschardt. She was the first royal yacht of a unified Germany.

In 1892 she was renamed Kaiseradler (Imperial eagle) and then scrapped in 1912.

=== SMY Hohenzollern II ===
Wilhelm II required a more impressive modern vessel to match those of the British royalty and Hohenzollern II was launched on 27 June 1892, the build completed the same year by AG Vulcan Stettin. She was 120 metres (390 ft) long, had a beam of 14 metres (46 ft) and drew 5.6 metres (18 ft), with 9,588 indicated horsepower (7,150 kW). The ship entered service in 1893 and was used as the Imperial Yacht and aviso from 1893 to July 1914. In 1899, Kaiser Wilhelm II used the ship to visit the United Kingdom, arriving in Portsmouth Harbour on 19 November 1899 and attending a royal Fleet review. From 1894 to 1914, with the exception of 1906, Emperor Wilhelm II used her on his annual prolonged Nordlandfahrt trips to Norway. In total he spent over four years on board. She was captained by Erich Raeder during the Edwardian era.

In June 1914 Hohenzollern II attended the Kiel regatta and on 25 June the last state banquet was held on board to entertain officers of the British fleet whose ships had been invited to attend.

At the end of July 1914 Hohenzollern II was put out of service in Kiel, the last captain being Kapitän zur See Johannes V. Karpf. The ship became the property of the Weimar Republic in 1918. Struck on 27 February 1920, she was scrapped in 1923 in Wilhelmshaven.

Hohenzollern II
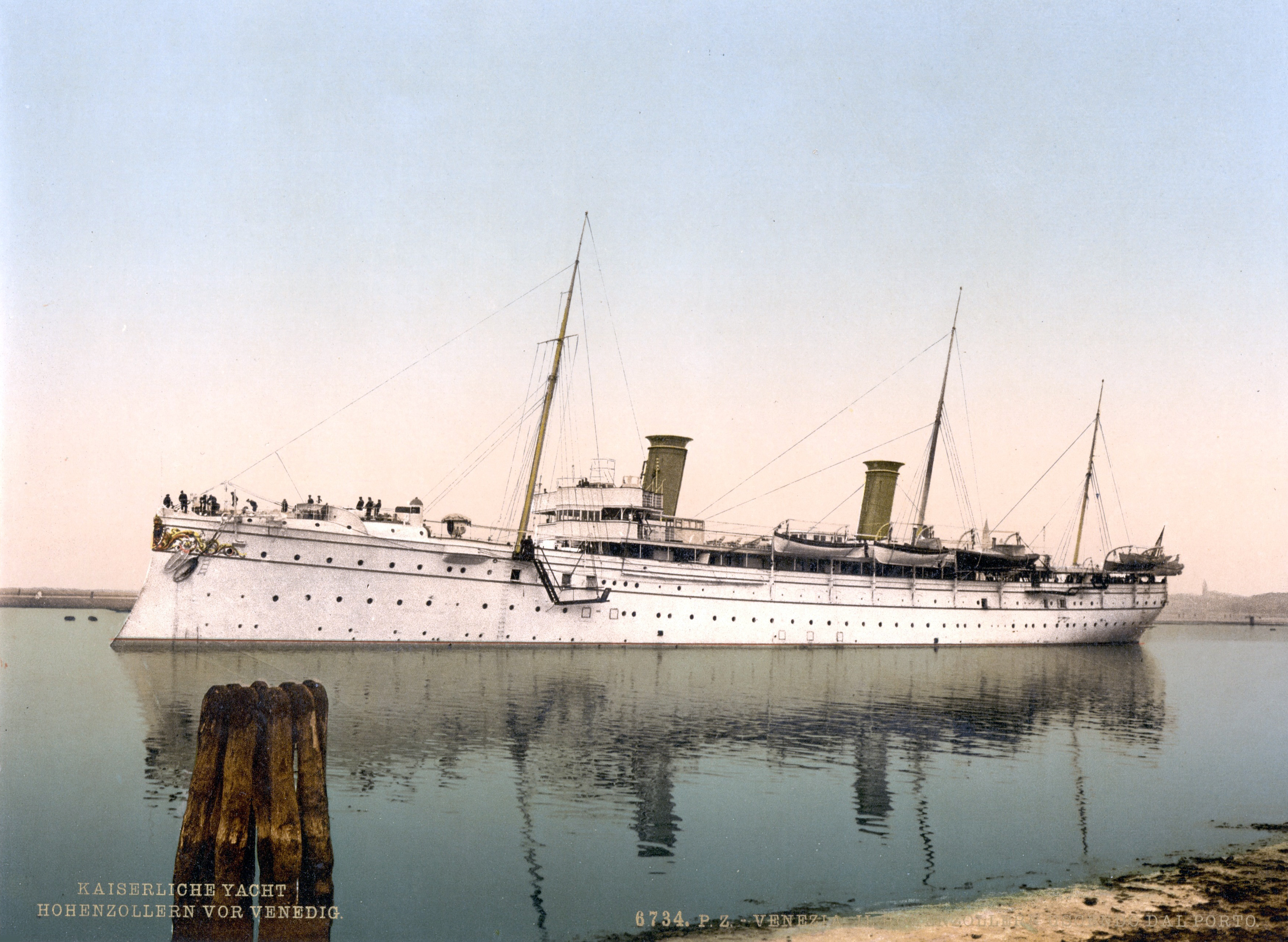
Hohenzollern II in Venice, Italy. Photochrom print, 1890s

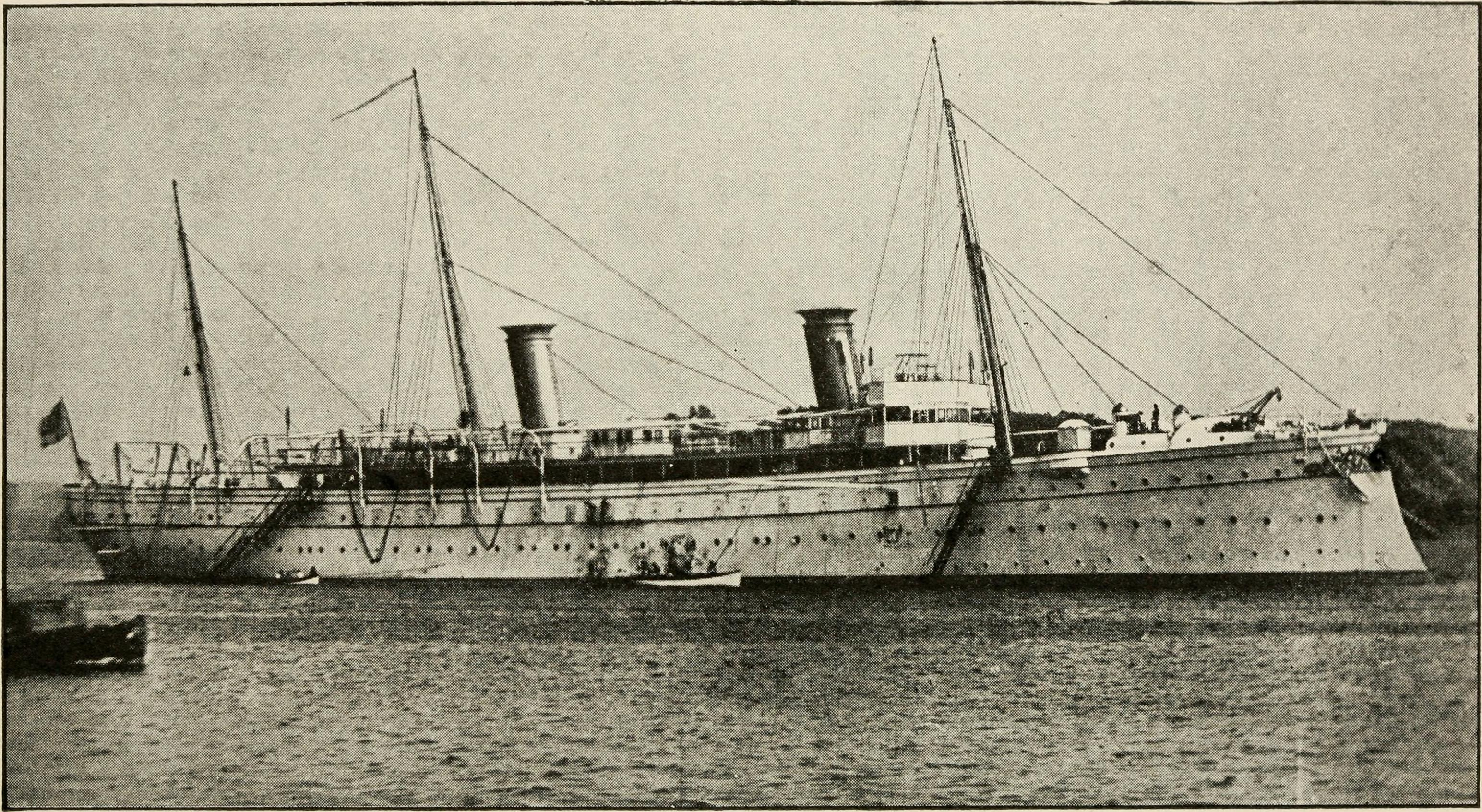
SMY Hohenzollern II

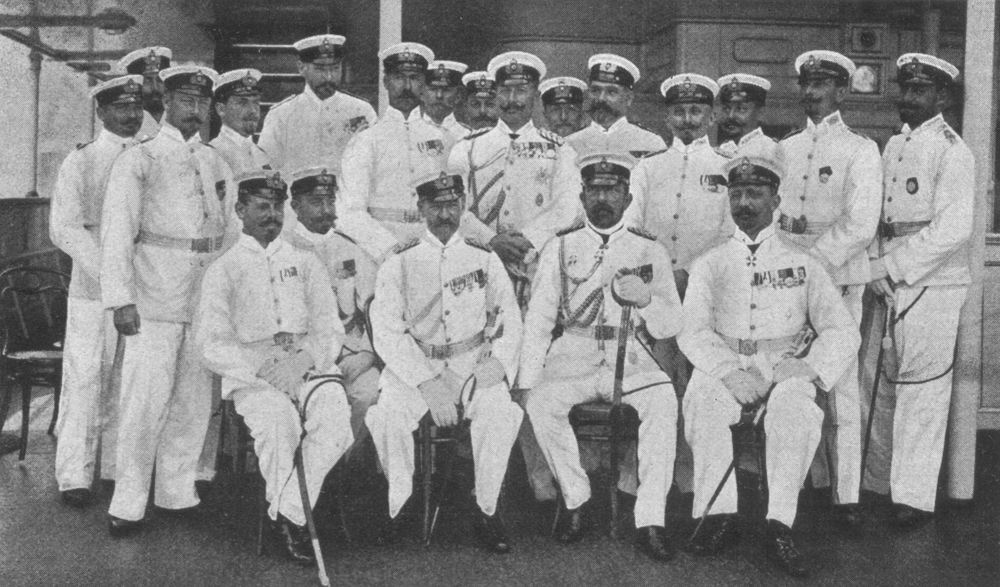
Wilhem II and officers on the ship, 1902

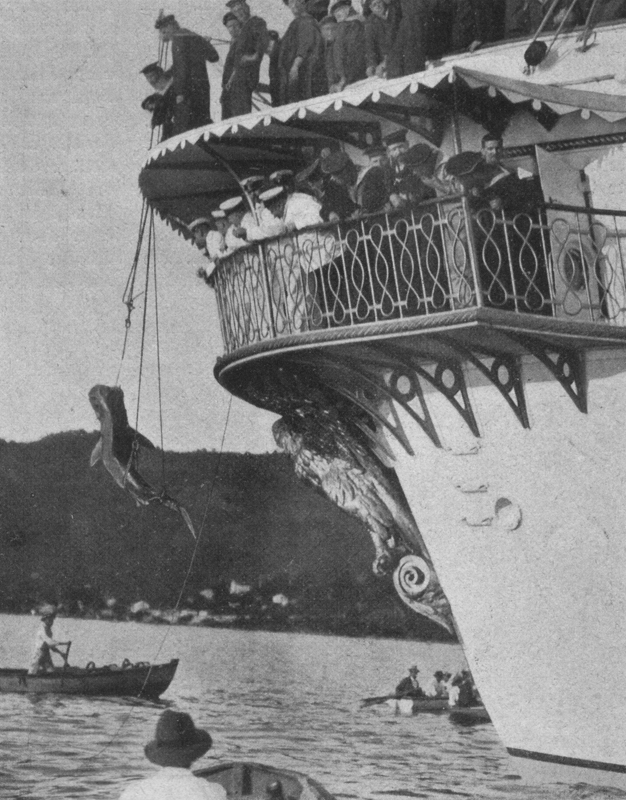
Shark fishing off the stern, 1902

=== SMY Hohenzollern III ===
Hohenzollern III was launched in September 1914 in Stettin but never finished due to war. She was struck in 1919 and scrapped in 1923 at Deutsche Werke in Kiel.

== Philately ==
The imperial yacht was the subject of the Yacht issue produced for postal use in German colonies.

SMY Hohenzollern in Philately
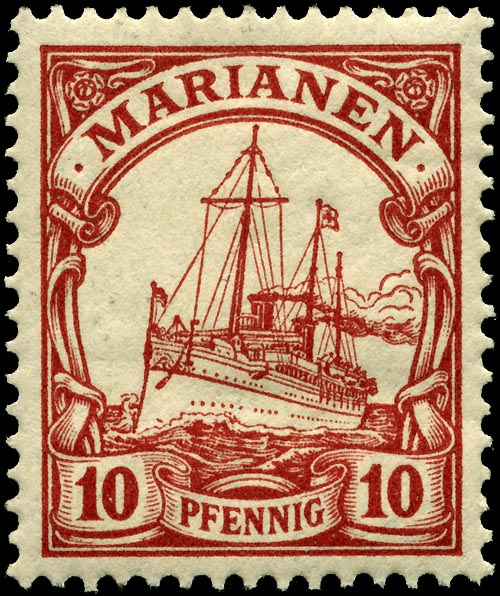
Hohenzollern II is depicted on the Yacht issue.

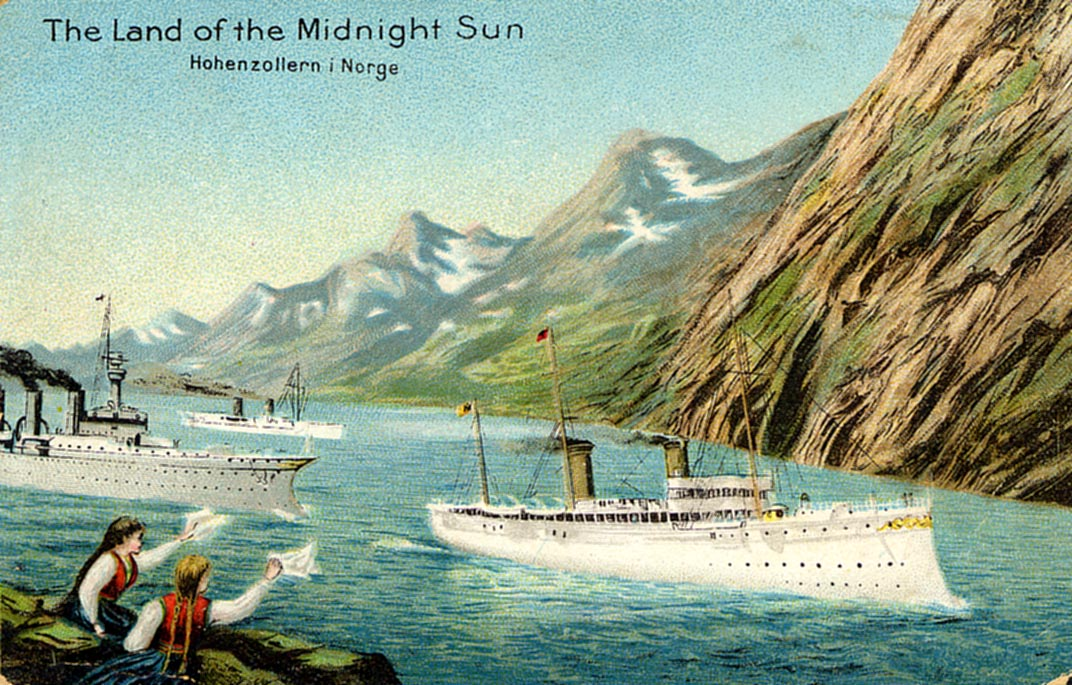
Postcard depicting SMY Hohenzollern II in Norway

The ship was also represented on medals commissioned following the Kaiser's 1898/1899 visit to Palestine and Jerusalem.

== Bibliography ==
- Frampton, Viktor; Freivogel, Zvonmir; Kindrachuk, Mark & Smyers, Richard Paul (2010). "Question 25/46: German Imperial Yachts". Warship International. XLVII (3): 209–211. ISSN 0043-0374.
- Warship International Staff (2015). "International Fleet Review at the Opening of the Kiel Canal, 20 June 1895". Warship International. LII (3): 255–263. ISSN 0043-0374.
