= Postage stamps and postal history of South West Africa =

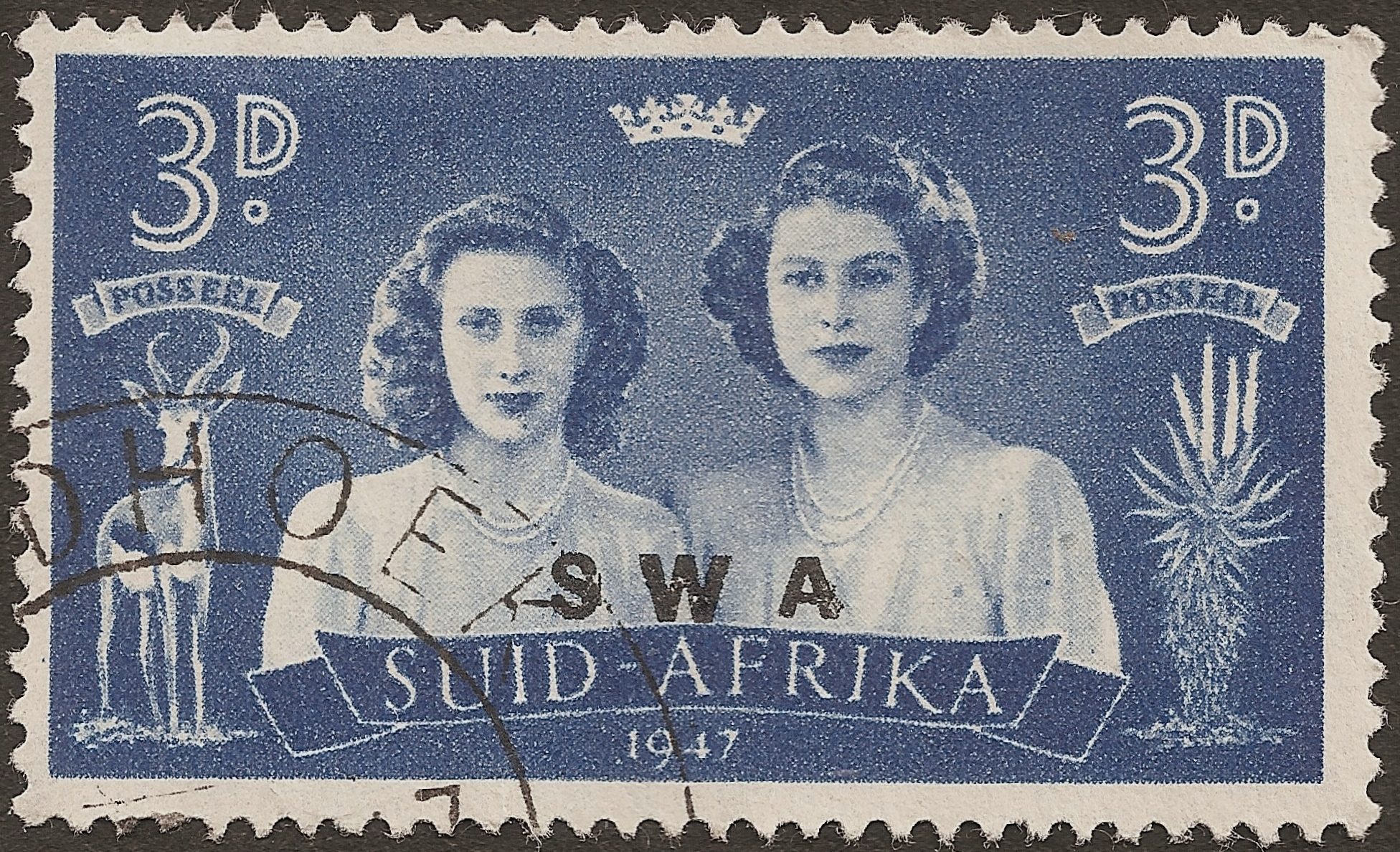
Stamps of South Africa overprinted for use in SWA 1947. The stamps show Princesses Elizabeth and Margaret and commemorated the visit of the British royal family to Africa.

Postage stamps were issued in the South African-administered colony of South West Africa from 1914 to 1989.

== History ==
The South African Army overran German South West Africa in 1914–15 and, in 1922, a League of Nations mandate gave South Africa the responsibility of administering the colony, now renamed South West Africa. South Africa controlled the postal service until Namibian independence in 1990. After World War II, the mandate was supposed to transform the colony into a United Nations Trust Territory, but South Africa objected to it coming under UN control and refused to allow the territory's transition to independence, regarding it as a fifth province.

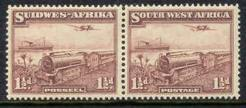
1937 1½p stamp

Stamps issued by the Union of South Africa were used from 1914 until 1953. The first stamps inscribed "South West Africa" were issued bilingually in English and Afrikaans (Suidwes Afrika) on 1 January 1923. From 1970, the abbreviation "SWA" was in general use. However, some postmarks featured German as well as Afrikaans and English.

In 1973, South West Africa became part of the South African post code system, using the number range 9000–9299. This was withdrawn from use after the territory gained independence as Namibia in 1990. In addition, Afrikaans was removed from postmarks, which, following independence, were in English only.

In 1989, the last definitive stamps of South West Africa were a set of 15 depicting minerals and mining. Following independence, most of the designs were kept with only the name changed (cuprite was dropped and willemite added for the Namibian issue) and the removal of Afrikaans names.

Another problem was that one of the stamps, for boltwoodite, had an error in its chemical equation. This was corrected in the Namibian issue. Namibia has issued regular definitive and commemorative stamps since independence in 1990, NamPost being its postal authority.

== See also ==
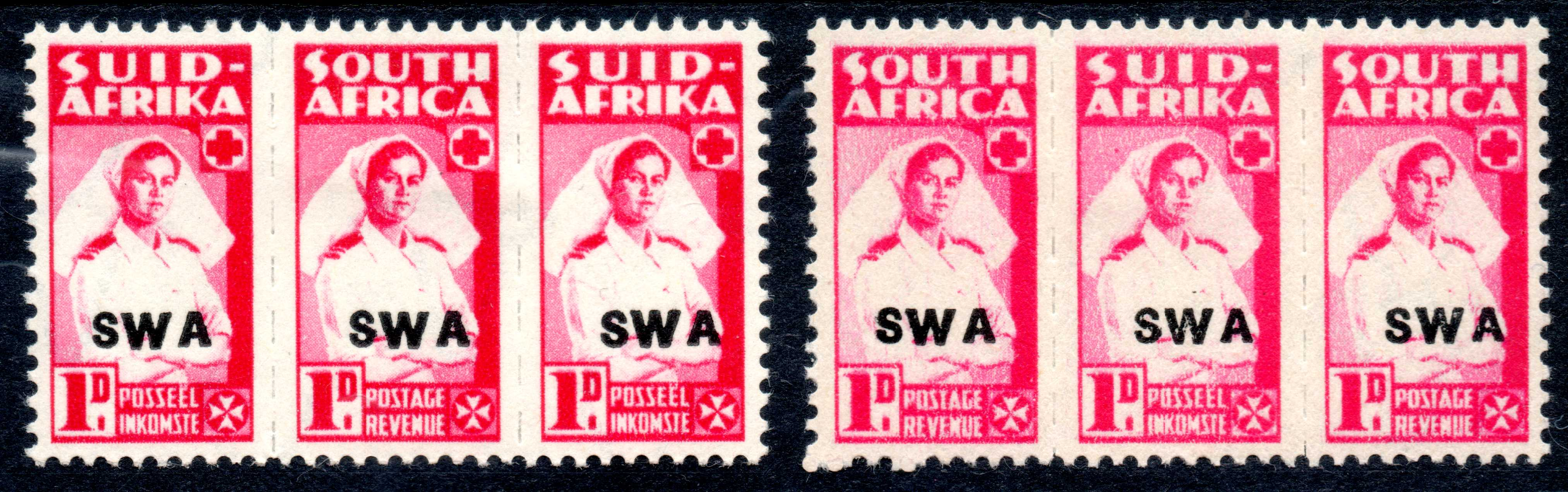
During World War II, small economy stamps were used in SWA.

- Postage stamps and postal history of German South West Africa
- Postage stamps and postal history of Namibia

== Bibliography ==
- Becker, Natie. The Overprinted Stamps of South West Africa to 1930. s.l.: Philatelic Holding (Pty) Ltd trading as Stanley Gibbons South Africa and Framic (Pty) Ltd., 1990 218p.
- Mallet-Veale, H. South-West Africa: a check list. London: Harris Publications Ltd., 1928 43p. Series Title: "Philatelic Magazine" handbook; no. 12.
- Putzel, Ralph F. The Comprehensive Handbook of the Postmarks of German South West Africa/South West Africa/Namibia. Tokai, South Africa: R.F. Putzel, 1991 600p.
- Quik, W.J. De postzegels van Zuidwest Afrika, de Verenigde Naties veranderde in 1968 de naam in Nambibië: 1884–1990. Krimpen a/d Ijssel: Filatelistenvereniging Zuidelijk Afrika, 2005 ISBN 90-807654-2-2 353p.
- Quik, W.J. and J. Stolk. De Postwaardestukken van Zuid-West Afrika 1888–1990 = The Postal Stationery of South West Africa 1888–1990. Rotterdam: Filatelistenvereniging Zuideijk Afrika, 2003 ISBN 90-803152-0-6 145p.
- Rust, Hans Joachim. Südwestafrika. Bayreuth: Schwarz, 1963 40p.
- The South African Stamp Colour Catalogue 2019–20. 36th ed. Johannesburg: International Philatelic Service, 2019 406p.
- Stephan, Adolf. Die Erste Dezimal Dauerserie und Ihre Merkmale = The First Decimal Definitive Series and its Characteristics. Windhoek: s.l., 1988 109p.
