= Yacht issue =

Series of German postage stamps

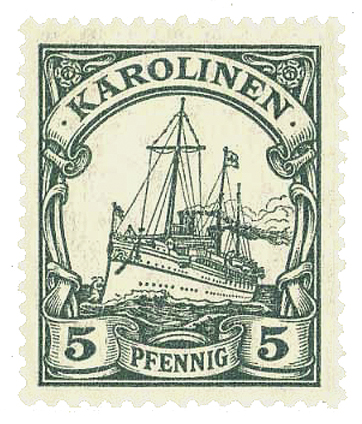
A Yacht issue (small design) stamp for the German Caroline Islands.

The Yacht issue was a series of postage stamps, bearing the image of German Kaiser's yacht, SMY Hohenzollern II, that were used in all of Germany's overseas colonies. Millions of stamps were produced and they were the principal means of postage for all German imperial overseas possessions in the years 1900–1915. German colonies at that time were German Samoa, Kiautschou Bay, Togoland, Kamerun, German New Guinea, German South-West Africa, and German East Africa.

== History ==
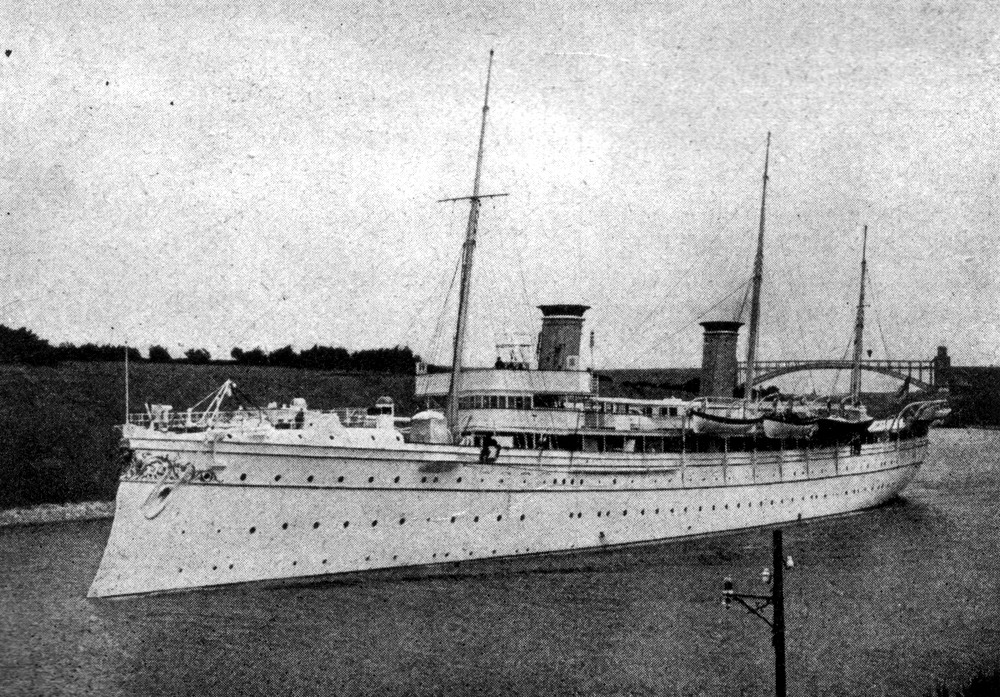
The SMY Hohenzollern II in 1902.

The German colonies were all acquired between 1884 and 1899. They belonged to the Universal Postal Union and used the same postage rates as the mainland German Empire. Initially, regular Imperial stamps from the mainland were used, and only their cancellation marks would reveal their colonial usage; later, the names of the individual colonies were overprinted upon the regular stamps before sale. In 1900, a new stamp design was released for universal use in all the colonies.

Redolent of the imperial grandeur of the Kaiser, the yacht was used as a symbol of German power and prestige. The seafaring nature of the design also underscored the new hopes of the German Empire under Wilhelm II. The Kaiser had embarked on a quest to expand worldwide and by 1898 was rapidly building his navy to compete with other world powers, particularly Great Britain.

The "Yachts" were first released in 1900 and remained the standard postal design for all German colonial mail until shortly after the outbreak of the First World War. By mid-1915 all the German colonies had surrendered to Allied forces, and with them came their postal administrations. The confiscated German stamps, virtually all of them Yachts, were stamped with new names and prices for Allied wartime use. The Yachts thus continued in service throughout the war years, unlike the Kaiser's yacht itself which was decommissioned in June 1914.

== Printing ==
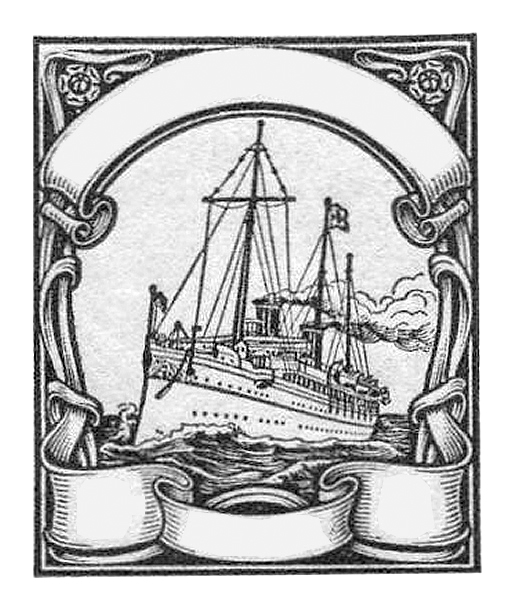
The blank key plate could be engraved as needed.

Individual Yacht issues were printed from master printing plates which were blank in the "scrolls" surrounding the design. These "key plate stamps" could be engraved with names and prices as needed. Sometimes blank stamps were printed and stored, and the text would be overprinted later. On fully engraved plates, the text color matches the design color, while overprinted blanks have their text in rich black ink.

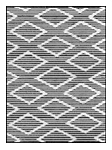
The "lozenges" watermark used on the stamp back

The printing was done by the intaglio method, which required moistening of the paper before printing. After the drying process was complete, the irregular contraction of the paper would sometimes cause the finished stamps to have designs of slightly different size. Early printings were not watermarked, but from 1905 onwards, the classic "lozenges" watermark was applied to the back of the paper.

== Two designs ==
Two separate designs of the Yacht stamps were published. They were issued to each of the colonies in a standardized set of colors and denominations. The less expensive varieties (3–20 pf. and 1–2 marks) were printed in monotone shades of red, orange, green, indigo and brown. The more expensive versions (25–50 pf. and 3–5 marks) were printed differently for aesthetic appeal: the small design had its ship and text printed with extra heavy black outlines, while the larger design was printed with contrasting colors like red and green.

Most of the stamps were denominated in German currency (1 Mark = 100 Pfennig), although German East Africa used its own currency, the Rupie (1 Rupie = 64 Pesa and, from 1905, 1 Rupie = 100 Heller). The leased port of Kiatschou used the Chinese Dollar ($1 = 100 Cents) as its currency after 1905.

=== Large design Yacht ===
The larger, more broadside, and more expensive version was printed in values of 1, 2 3, or 5 marks. The large Yacht issues were panoramic and were designed in two subtly distinct versions, one with a long unfurled scroll and another with a shorter, double-folded scroll. Together they provided the large Yachts with a visual uniformity across colonies because the font size would always be roughly the same, in contrast to the small design.

==== Large design: representative varieties ====
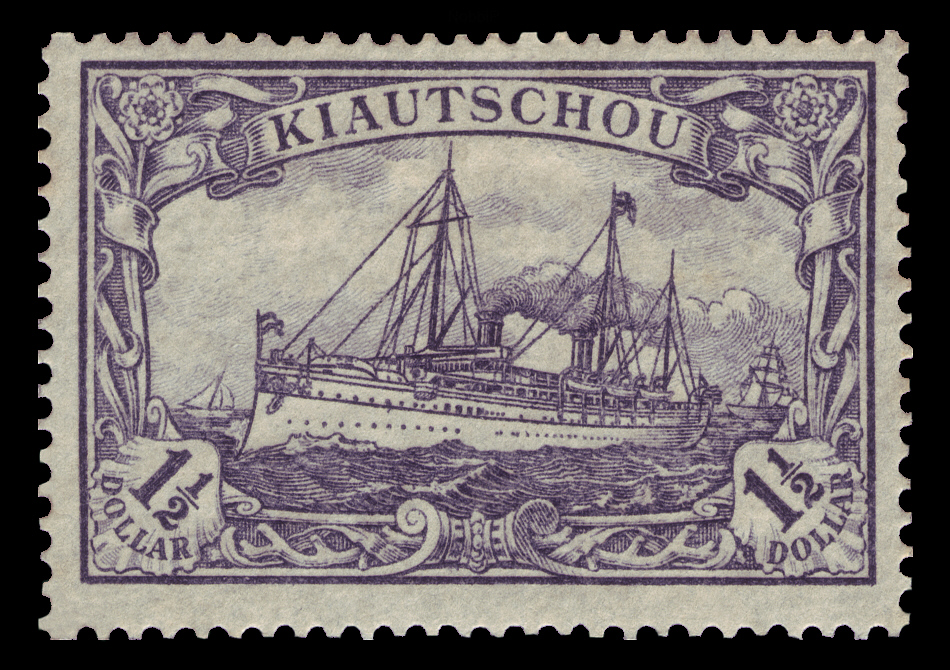
Short scroll: one-color, 1.5 Chinese dollars, Kiautschou.

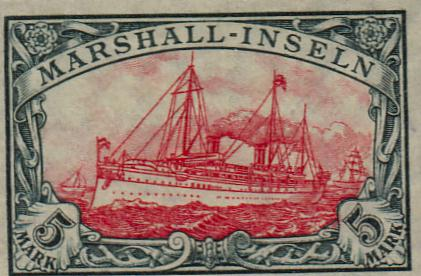
Long scroll: two-color, five marks, German Marshall Islands.

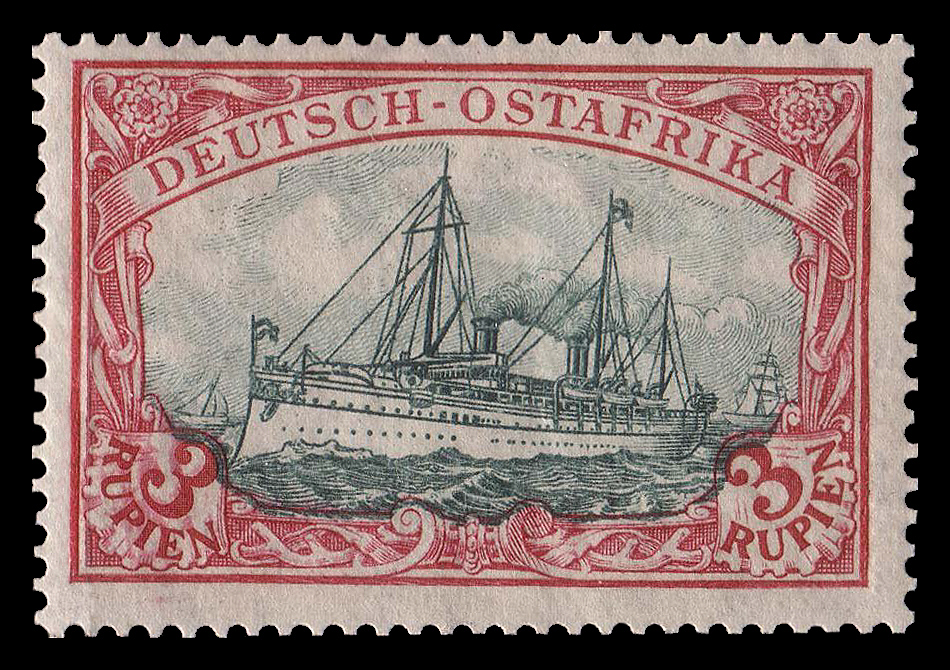
Long scroll: two-color, 3 rp., German East Africa.

=== Small design Yacht ===
The smaller, forward-facing design was more common, and was printed in values of 3, 5, 10, 20, 25, 30, and 50 pfennigs. The small Yacht issues all have exactly the same design with differences only in the text. Because the size of the blank scrolls could not be altered, significant changes to font size and structure were necessary to accommodate colony names of varying length: German Southwest Africa stood out from other issues for its tightly cramped letters, while Togo and Samoa required decorative emblems to fill in the yawning blank spaces around their names.

==== Small design: representative varieties ====
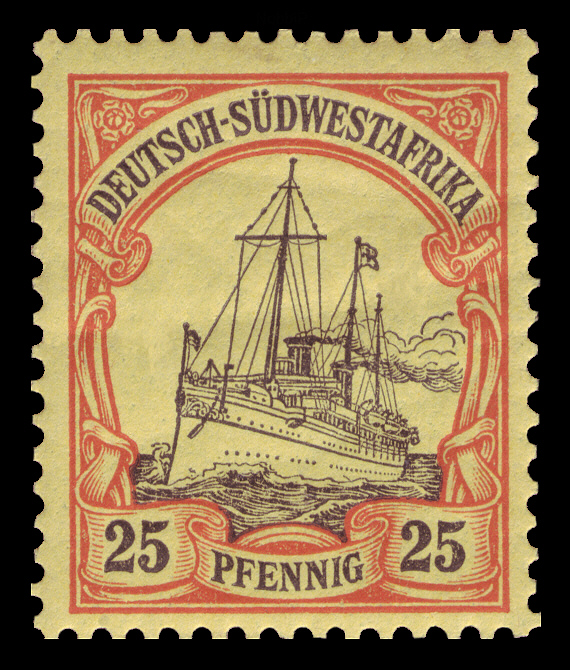
German Southwest Africa.

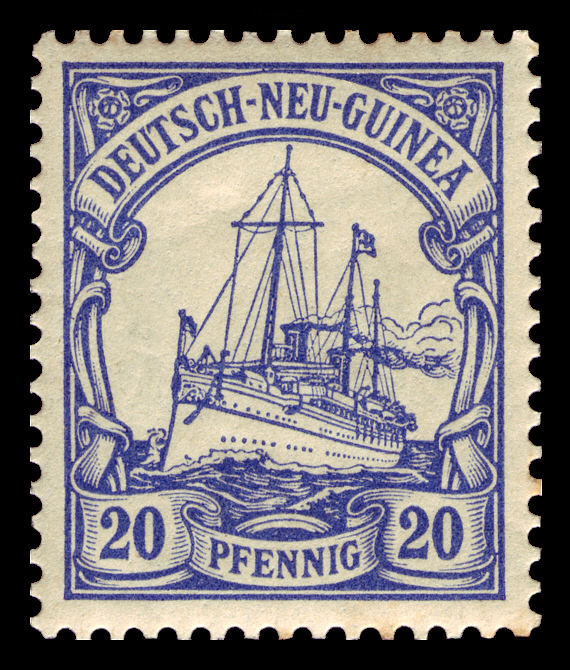
German New Guinea.

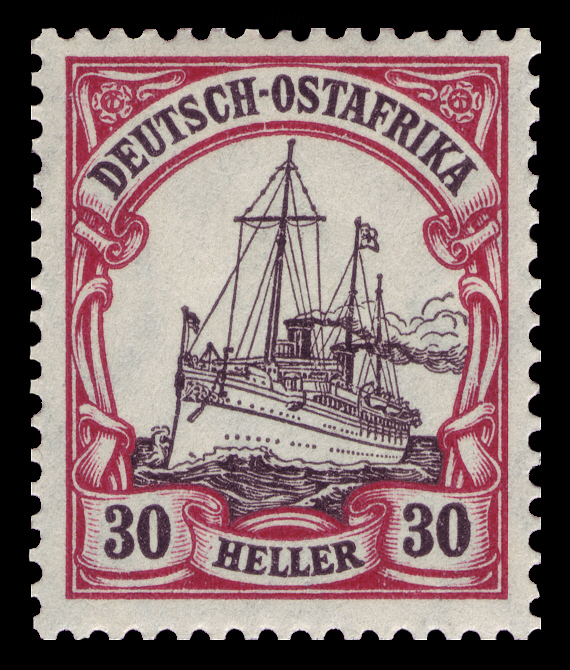
German East Africa.

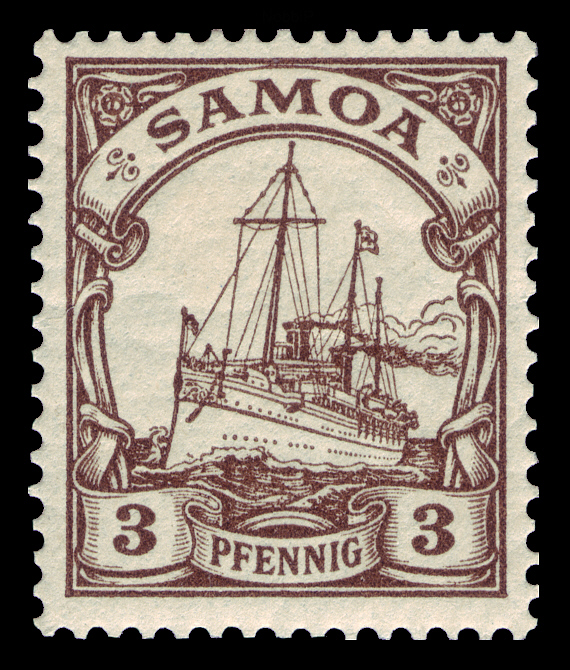
German Samoa.

== Allied overprint versions ==
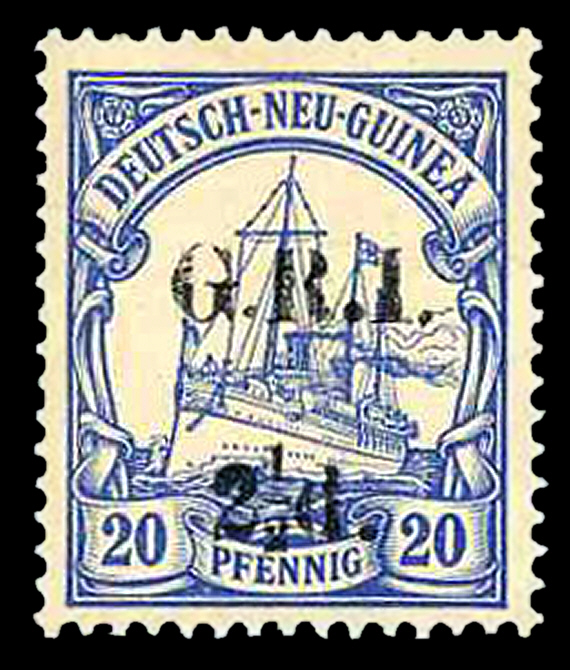
A British overprint, "GRI", of 1915.

Following Allied occupation in the First World War, the German colonies had their stamps seized, but most were rereleased within a few days. The stamps were overprinted with the occupiers' postal codes and redenominated to the appropriate new currency. This breach of postal etiquette was taken quite poorly in Germany, and at least one provincial governor, in Belgium, decreed heavy penalties for any stamp collectors or dealers possessing Allied stamps.

Issues of German New Guinea and Marshall Islands were, like Samoa, surcharged by the British with "G.R.I." for Georgius Rex Imperator. In Kamerun, issues were overprinted "C.E.F." for the Cameroon Expeditionary Force. The stamps of Togo were surcharged "TOGO Anglo French Occupation" and "TOGO Occupation franco-anglaise" by British and French authorities respectively. Many of these Allied overprints are now exceedingly rare and there are numerous known forgeries.

== See also ==
- Postage stamps and postal history of the German colonies
- Postage stamps and postal history of Togo
- Postage stamps and postal history of German South-West Africa
- Postage stamps and postal history of German East Africa
- German post offices abroad
- SMY Hohenzollern
