= Postage stamps and postal history of the German colonies =

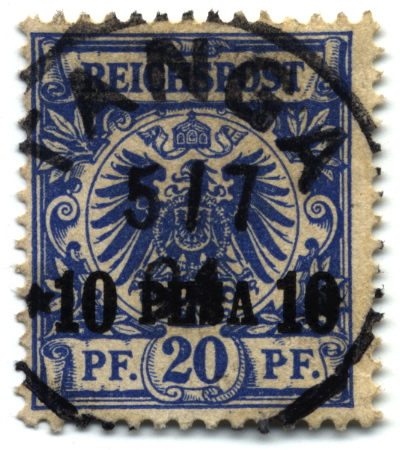
A German stamp surcharged 10 pesa in 1893 for use in German East Africa, with cancellation mark from "Tanga"

This is a survey of postage stamps and postal history of the German colonies and part of the postage stamps and postal history of Germany, as well as those of the individual countries and territories concerned.

== Overview ==
With the establishment of a colonial empire by the newly unified Germany after 1871 and before the issuance of specific stamps inscribed with the name of the colony, definitive stamps of Germany were used. Only postally used stamps can be identified as having been used in the colony as the cancellation mark identifies the point of origin; these stamps are known as "Vorläufer" (forerunner) stamps. By about 1897 provisional stamps came into use in the form of German definite stamps with overprints identifying the colony. By the end of 1900 and early 1901 the yacht issue was printed in Berlin and issued for each colony with its identifying inscription, initially without watermarks, and by 1905 and thereafter as a reissue with lozenges watermarks. German colonial postal services ceased at varying times during World War I as colonies were occupied by forces of the Allies. During occupation, German yacht series stamps were used for a limited time with overprints in a number of territories. In Germany, even after the loss of the colonies, the Reichspost continued to sell yacht stamps of colonies for dealers and collectors until after World War I; such stamps, however, were not postally used.

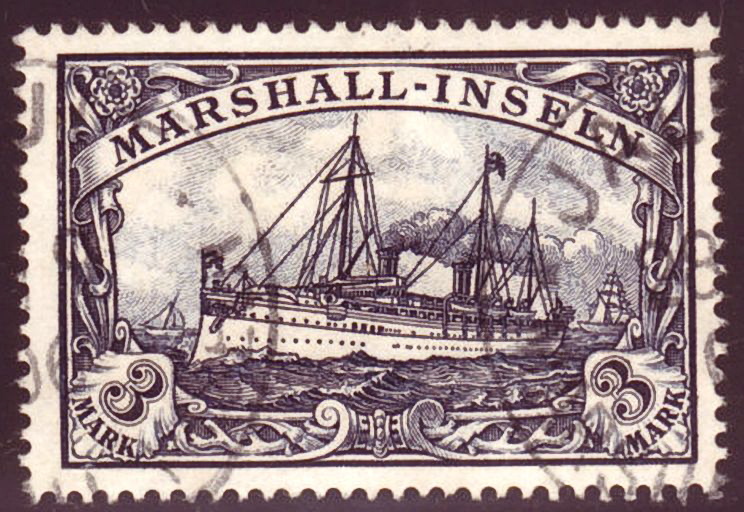
Stamp from the yacht issue of the Marshall Islands

Most German colonial stamps were denominated in German Currency (1 Mark = 100 Pfennig). However, German East Africa used its own currency on stamps of 1893 and later, the Rupie (1 Rupee = 64 Pesa and from 1905 1 Rupie = 100 Heller) and the leased Chinese territory of Kiautschou used the Chinese dollar ($1 = 100 Cents) from 1905.

German colonies have been a popular philatelic area and, as a rule of thumb, vorläufer stamps as well as used stamps of high denomination tend to be quite valuable.

Se-tenants (Zusammendrucke) were issued for Kamerun, German South-West Africa, and German East Africa and consist of stamps that were sold together with advertisement stamps.

German Colonial stamps should not be confused with foreign offices stamps that were issued in China, Morocco, and Turkey in agreement with local authorities.

== German colonies ==
=== German East Africa ===
German postal services in German East Africa started on October 4, 1890. However, prior to the Heligoland-Zanzibar Treaty German postal offices were briefly in operation at Lamu (November 22, 1888, to March 31, 1891) and Zanzibar (August 27, 1890, to July 31, 1891). Initially, definite German stamps were used. By July 1, 1893, overprints were used to indicate the local currency, namely pesa, and three years later the overprint also included the name of the colony "Deutsch-Ostafrika". The yacht issue arrived on January 1, 1901, and was modified in 1905 by the switch to the Heller currency, and in 1906 and later by the use of a watermark.

During World War I stamps became scarce in the colony. In some instances stamps of the cruiser Königsberg were used in 1916. The last issues were the 2.5 heller, 7.5 heller and 1 rupie stamps that did not follow the yacht design but were locally produced at the mission printing office Wuga at Wilhelmsthal (Lushoto) in 1916. Gradually, during World War I, more and more parts of the colony were occupied by British, Belgian, and Portuguese forces who issued their own stamps. In 1915, the British authorities used the yacht stamps with overprints.

=== German New Guinea ===
In German New Guinea issues of the German Empire were denominated in Pfennigs and Marks and were first used on February 15, 1888; later at various postal offices. These issues are recognized by the cancellation mark. Starting in 1897 German definitive stamps carried the overprint "Deutsch-Neu-Guinea" allowing also for the identification of unused stamps. On January 1, 1901, the yacht issues for "Deutsch-Neu-Guinea" were introduced with values from 3 Pfennigs to 5 Marks. The 3 values of the 1914 yacht modification carry the inscription "Deutsch-Neuguinea" and have lozenge watermarks. The 3 Pfennig issue from 1919 has the inscription "Deutsch-Neu-Guinea" and watermarks and was not used postally. British-Australian occupation stamps in the form of "G.R.I." overprinted yacht stamps started to be used from October 1914. Cancellation marks are Finschhafen, Hatzfeldhafen, Kerawara, Konstantinhafen, Stephansort, Herbertshöhe, Friedrich-Wilhelmshafen, Matupi, and Berlinhafen.

=== German South-West Africa ===
Definitive German stamps were used first in German South-West Africa in 1888 and their use is only recognizable by the cancellation mark of the Colonial post office (i.e. "Otyimbingue, Keetmanshoop, Windhoek, Swakopmund"). Starting in May 1897, German stamps with the overprint "Deutsch-Südwest-Afrika" and one year later "Deutsch-Südwestafrika" were used. The yacht issue was introduced in November 1900 inscribed "Deutsch-Südwestafrika" first without watermarks, and with lozenge water marks in 1906 and later. In September 1915 the territory was occupied by South Africa and German colonial postal service ceased to exist.

=== Caroline Islands ===
German postal services started in the Caroline Islands on October 12, 1899, and consisted of overprinted ("Karolinen") German stamps. The yacht issue was introduced in January 1901. Lack of stamps led to the Ponape issues in 1905 and 1910 when stamps were either split or overprinted to stretch use.

=== Kamerun ===
German stamps were first used in German Kamerun on February 7, 1887, in the form of Vorläufer stamps that can be recognized by the "Kamerun" and "Viktoria" cancellation marks. In April 1897, German provisionals with "Kamerun" overprint became available. In November 1900, the yacht issue was introduced. The watermarked version of the yacht issues appeared from 1905. Shortage of stamps led to the "Longji" issue of 1911. The German post office closed in 1915 with the British occupation, Kamerun yacht stamps were overprinted "C.E.F." (Cameroons Expeditionary Force) and British currency denominations. Kamerun yacht stamps (with watermark) were issued to collectors in Germany between 1915 and 1919.

=== Kiautschou ===
German stamps were first used in Kiautschou on January 26, 1898, in the form of Vorläufer stamps that can be recognized by the "Tsingtau" cancellation mark. On May 9, 1900, German stamps with "China" overprint and German Pfenning surcharge became available. In January 1901, the yacht issue was introduced. The Pfenning/Mark denomination was replaced in 1905 with a new yacht issue in cents and dollars. The German post office closed with the Japanese occupation on November 7, 1914.

=== Mariana Islands ===
German stamps were first used in the German Mariana Islands on November 18, 1899, in the form of overprinted ("Marianen"). In May 1900, German provisionals with overprints were issued followed by the yacht issue in January 1901. The German post office closed with the Japanese occupation on October 14, 1914. Yacht stamps with lozenge watermarks were issued in Germany later for collectors.

=== Marshall Islands ===
German postal service started in the German Marshall Islands on October 1, 1888, evident in the form of vorläufer stamps that can be recognized by the "Jaluit" cancellation mark. In 1897 German stamps with "Marschall-Inseln" overprint became available and replaced by 1899 with the "Marshall-Inseln" overprint. In January 1901, the yacht issue was introduced. The German post office closed with the British occupation on December 16, 1914. Yacht stamps were overprinted with "G.R.I." and new British denominations. In Germany between 1916 and 1919 Marshall-Inseln yacht stamps (with water mark) were sold to collectors.

=== Samoa ===
German stamps were first used in German Samoa on September 21, 1886, in the form of vorläufer stamps that can be recognized by the "Apia" cancellation mark. In April 1900 German stamps with "Samoa" overprint became available. In December 1900, the yacht issue was introduced. The German post office closed with the British occupation on September 3, 1914. "G.R.I." overprinted yacht stamps carried British denominations. In Germany between 1915 and 1919 Samoa yacht stamps (with water mark) were sold to collectors.

=== Togo ===
German stamps were first used in German Togo on March 1, 1888, in the form of vorläufer stamps that can be recognized by the "Klein-Popo" and "Lome" cancellation marks. In 1897, 1900 German stamps with "Togo" overprint became available. In November 1900, the yacht issue was introduced. It was replaced in 1909 with the water-marked issues. The German post office closed with the British occupation in September 1914 and French occupation in October 1914. The occupying forces used yacht issues with "Anglo-French Occupation" overprints. In Germany between 1915 and 1919 Samoa yacht stamps (with water mark) were sold to collectors.

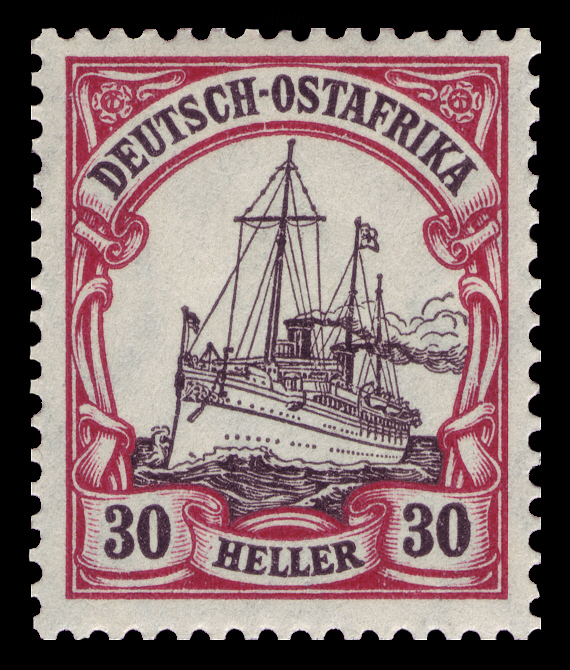
German East Africa

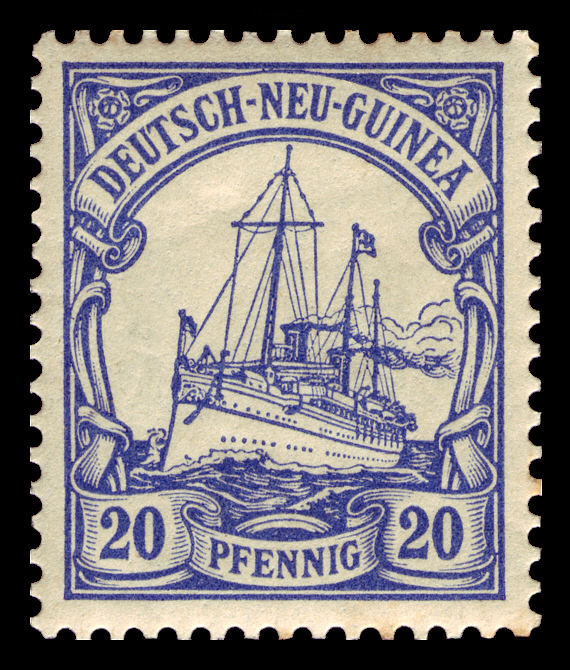
German New Guinea

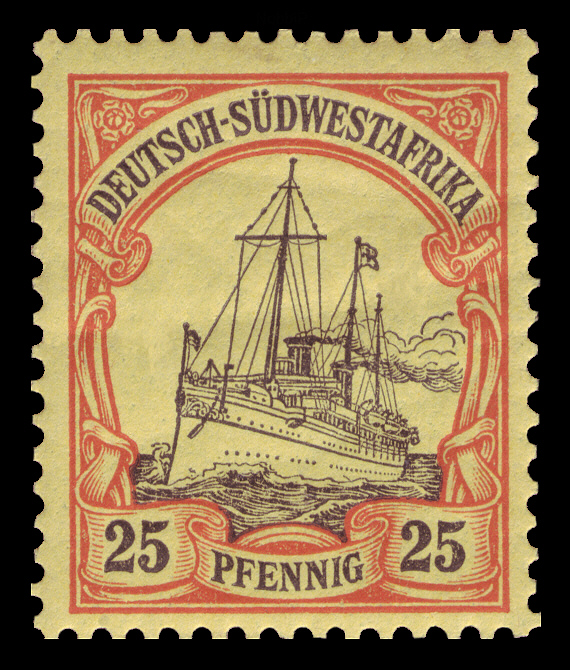
German Southwest Africa

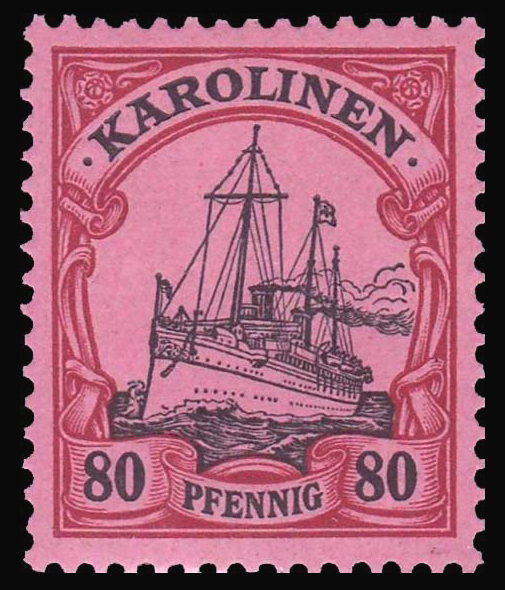
German Caroline Islands

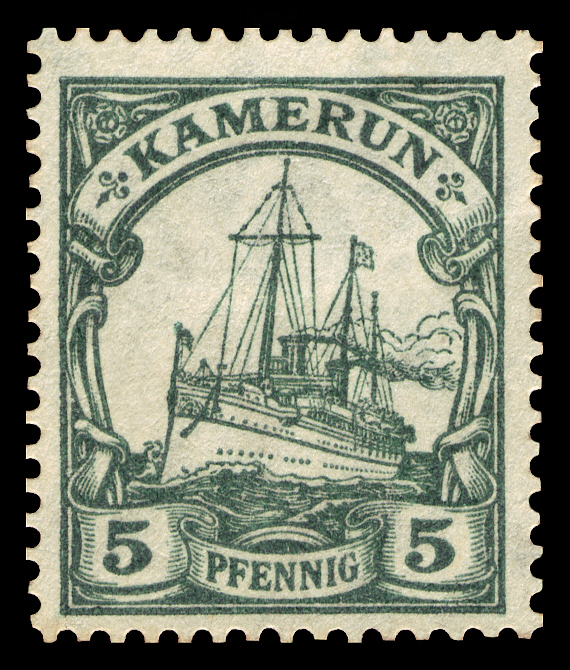
German Kamerun

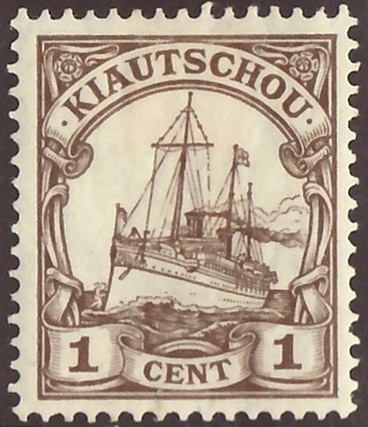
Kiautschou

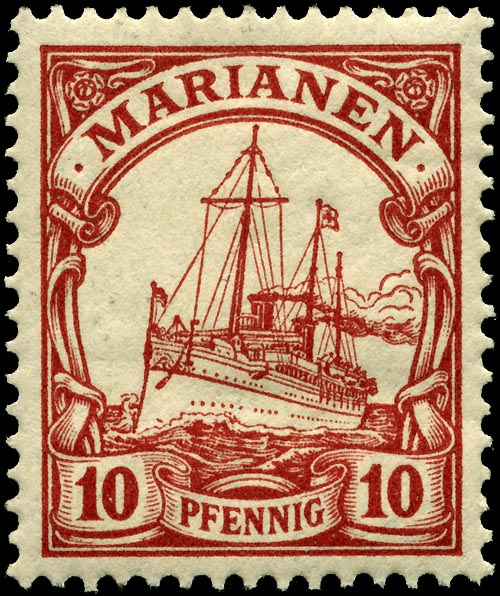
German Mariana Islands

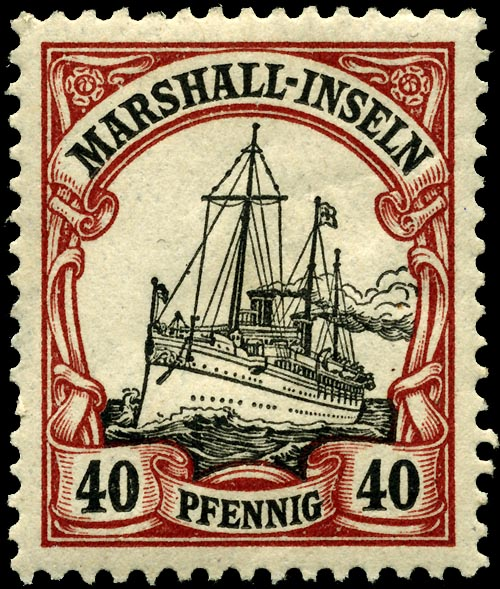
German Marshall Islands

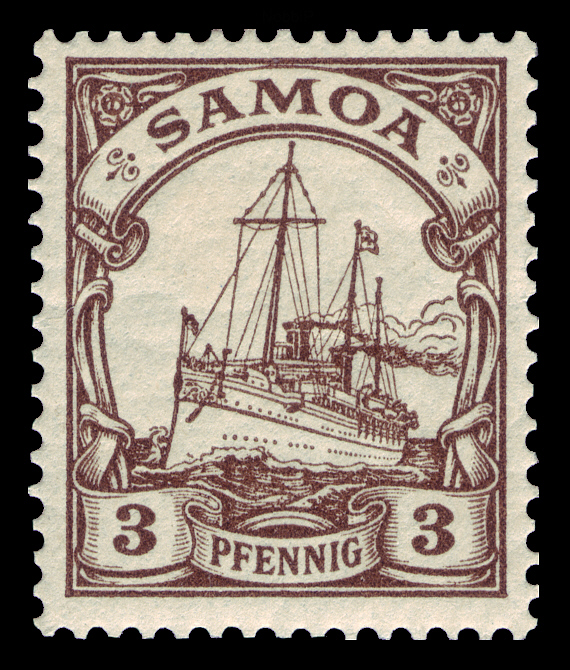
German Samoa

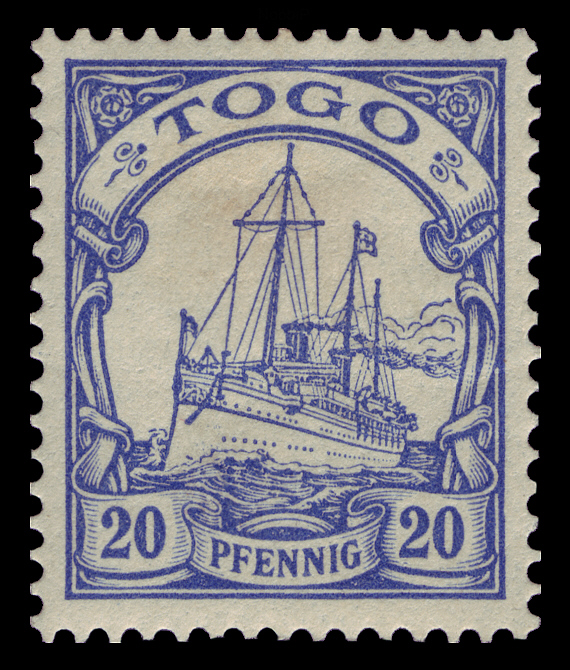
German Togo

== Forgeries ==
As many stamps of the colonies are valuable yet based on commonly available definitive German stamps, the stage is set for forgery. A forger may just "overprint" a common stamp of the period. Forgeries started to appear as early as 1903. A notable forger was François Fournier who produced "reproductions" which are close enough to the originals to fool the unsuspecting buyer. In recent years, the so-called "Hialeah Forgeries" have appeared on eBay and other auctions and include, among others, stamps from the Marshall Islands with falsified "G.R.I." overprints. In the "Blüm Case", a forger produced false cancellation and expertizing stamps that were applied to German colony stamps and others.

== See also ==
- Yacht issue

== References and sources ==
Notes

Sources

- Michel-Katalog Deutschland Spezial. Schwaneberger Verlag GmbH. 1997. ISBN 3-87858-129-7.
