= Justice and the Market =

Justice and the Market is an ethical perspective based upon the allocation of scarce resources within a society which balances justice against the market. The allocation of resources depends upon governmental policies and the societal attitudes of the individuals who exist within the society. Personal perspectives are based upon ones circle of moral concern or those who the individual deems worthy of moral consideration.

Philosophers, economists and politicians have sought to answer the question of which members of society deserve material rewards and how to decide what deserving is based upon. Perspectives of distributive justice vary from collectivism to extreme self-sufficiency; these perspectives vary between the importance of the group or individual respectively. Positions on distributive justice incorporate moral and political philosophies to form the extremes of communism (left wing) and libertarianism (right-wing) that exist on a continuum scale.

20th century philosopher John Rawls attempted to create a thought experiment that would allow for the consideration of a societal design that is best for all involved. Mechanisms of redistribution vary among countries and governmental roles within societies determine the redistributive mechanisms that are used.

== Distributive justice ==
Distributive justice relates to the principle of fairness in the allocation of wealth, income, power and opportunities. Many theoretical paradigms have been developed to approach distributive justice such as Adam Smith's invisible hand, Karl Marx's Socialist view of Communism and John Rawls original position on inequality.

== Libertarianism ==
The Libertarian philosophy refers to freedom, and particularly individual liberty which dictates the right and ability to govern one's self. In an economic sense the libertarian view assumes a free market, left to its own accord, is a fair market and that redistributive taxation is unjust. Many libertarian schools of thought exist with differing views on many principles, such as the role of government in the market place.

== Capitalist society ==
Adam Smith's idea of the invisible hand was a founding contribution to explain resource allocation within a society. The invisible hand metaphor portrayed an aggregated market created by the self-interest of those involved, and grounded in the notion that through fulfillment of one's own aspirations, society would benefit. This idea formed the foundation of laissez-faire economic philosophy and subsequent neoclassical economics, where Milton Friedman’s ideas about economic systems lay. The free market originated from the concept of the invisible hand, and eventuates in a meritocratic society with resources allocated on the basis of merit. Modern representations of this exemplify perfect free market capitalism.

=== Criticism of capitalism ===
The invisible hand approach, or pure free market capitalism, assumes that a competitive market allocates resources in an appropriate manner, but Stephen LeRoy highlighted the debate that ensued following the recent financial crisis upon whether this assumption holds true for modern economies. Thorstein Veblen in The Theory of the Leisure Class (1899) argued that some wealth is conspicuously consumed to display success to others. This proclivity to purchase luxury goods has been viewed as an inefficiency of the capitalist system. Galbraith’s writings centered mostly, however, on the market power of large corporations. He posited that the power of corporations and their associated advertising, would make the markets espoused in classical economic theory ineffectual, requiring a new economic theory to be developed. Critics of Galbraith in turn objected to the fact that the focus of his writings were lay readers, as opposed to expert academics, implying that his answers to economic problems are too simplistic. Social inequality and unfair distribution of wealth, are often attributed to capitalism and a pure free market is built upon a principle of rewarding effort. This however ignores persons born with greater natural abilities or greater opportunities. Thus, successive iterations of pure free market capitalism would lead to a market based upon feudal aristocracy.

Price controls are a government initiative to mitigate exploitative market power. Specifically in response to systems of pricing that capitalise on the dependency of one market entity upon another, such as monopolistic markets in which the supplier is a price maker and consumers assume the role of price taker. Price controls as a strategy provide relief from the price exploitation of the dominant player in a market transaction, albeit a short term abatement of this power which is a common criticism of this method.

== Communist society ==
Karl Marx in The Communist Manifesto postulated that the era of feudal aristocracy and the capitalism experienced in 1847 at the time of its writing, would be replaced with communism, or as today known, a socialist society. Communists from a Marxian perspective are described as persons that understand the world and are enlightened to the interests of the proletariat. Marx surmised that the "dictatorship of the proletariat" refers to rule by the working class and would see the battle of democracy as won.

In this scenario members of a society share common ownership of the means of production and rewards from that production. The resultant society gains and allocates resources according to the quote "From each according to his ability, to each according to his needs!". The communist approach eliminates scarcity in all respects, and represents a society from a pure collectivism school of thought, based upon the utilitarian moral perspective.

The impact of Marxist theories continues to this day. Alan Taylor compares The Communist Manifesto to a holy script, being acted upon and quoted by supporters that do not know the source of their belief.

=== Criticisms of the Communist Society ===
==== Utilitarianism ====
A Communist society utilises a utilitarian based moral approach as a means to preserve the society. In this system the rights of the collective are placed above the rights of individuals. The utilitarian paradigm represents "the greatest happiness principle" as theorized by John Stuart Mill. This theory holds that the best course of action is that which benefits the majority, and may require the sacrifice of some to maximise happiness overall.

==== Motivation ====
Within a Communist society the sole purpose of production is in maintaining the subsistence of the collective. Removing any role for self-interest also removes this incentive to exert effort by individuals because reward is not allocated proportionate to effort or in a meritocratic manner. Introduction of a rewards system (be it economic or otherwise) breaches the basis of the communist society, because reward places value on individual achievement. An additional criticism flows from Adam Smith's discovery of the effect of market signals on resource allocation. With no consumers to express demand, optimal resource levels cannot be maintained. Instead production occurs on the basis of need only and need is not measured by willingness to pay.

== Meritocracy ==
Meritocracy is an ideology founded in the works of Confucius, whereby the allocation of rewards, positions and responsibilities is objective and upon the merit of an individual. Merit is predominantly assessed via examinations and evaluations, but a perfect meritocracy is near impossible to achieve. The attainment of a university degree is purportedly an example of a meritocratic system, but the inability to ensure equal opportunity to access university by all refutes this point. Inequalities exist in access to prior education, socio-economic factors and as Rawls argues natural abilities and talents. Criticism of meritocracy comes from the reproduction of traditional hierarchies and inequality, when merit is not awarded in a meritocratic manner but instead on the basis of opportunity. Distribution based upon the arbitrary nature of desert faces criticism from egalitarianism, that dictates justice without equality is futile and that equality in itself is the highest form of justice.

== The Original Position ==
John Rawls conceived the notion of 'The Original Position' based upon the thought experiment whereby participants must agree to a hypothetical social contract under a veil of ignorance. In this approach to the question of societal design, removal of the knowledge of particular abilities, tastes and position within society creates a veil of ignorance. The application of this veil in the thought experiment determines the basic structure of society subjectively, because knowledge of the outcome and participant's subsequent position in the society is deprived. From this naive perspective, an evaluation of resource allocation can be made from a morally arbitrary point of view. The veil of ignorance favours the selection of 'the original position' a point in between self-sufficiency and collectivism, whereby two fundamental principles of justice would be agreed upon.

1. Equal rights to extensive basic liberties, compatible with a similar liberty for others.
2. Social and economic inequalities that (a) work to the benefit of the least advantaged members of society and (b) attached to positions and offices available to all.

As Rawls wrote: "They are the principles that free and rational persons concerned to further their own interests would accept in an initial position of equality as defining the fundamental terms of their association".

=== The Difference Principle ===
Rawls’ conclusion to the regulation of inequality, was a society based upon his proposed 'difference principle' - permitting inequalities that work to the advantage of the worst off. Not to be confused with trickle-down economics, this compensates for the natural abilities of individuals through a redistributive exercise. The society that results is therefore fair on the basis of opportunity regardless of natural ability.

=== Criticism of Rawls theory ===
Rawls arranged the fundamental principles of the Original Position in lexical priority: the liberty principle, fair equality of opportunity and lastly the difference principle. This prioritisation encounters criticism, as the importance of the first principle is awarded greater weighting and must be satisfied prior to subsequent principles. So whilst liberty is said to be the dominant principle, the difference principle that results from the acceptance of inequalities (the second principle) operates in violation of the first principle. This is exemplified by redistributive taxes as discussed by Robert Nozick in Anarchy, State and Utopia which criticises the use of this tax as a levelling mechanism, impinging upon an individual's basic liberties, the mainstay of the original position's principles.

Three objections to the difference principle are identified by Michael Sandel as follows: 1. A decreased incentive to work when top tier earners are taxed proportionately greater than lower tier earners. Reaching an equilibrium point demonstrates the difference principle. At equilibrium, top tier earners are provided with enough incentive so to remain in their positions of employment and thus continue to produce benefits also received by bottom tier earners. 2. A Meritocratic allocation of reward. 3. Self-Ownership of one's natural talents and abilities, violated by redistributive practises that treat these natural assets as public or communal.

== Redistributive mechanisms ==
Redistribution of wealth is attained through many forms such as taxation, monetary policies, welfare and nationalisation of private enterprise. Taxation as a means to redistribute wealth seeks to establish a level playing field for its constituents. Sweden has one of the highest income tax rates in the world, which translates to a high level of social welfare in the areas of education, healthcare and pensions. This is a mostly utilitarian form of society and results in a low Gini coefficient, a measure of equality of income 0.25. The United States of America has a relatively high Gini coefficient opposed to Sweden of 0.41. As such the USA faces a problematic history in public sector services. Accessibility issues exist in healthcare and education in particular. Private sector ownership of these services advantage those that can afford it and for those that cannot, inequality is exacerbated further.

== Inequality of wealth ==
The inequality of wealth distribution in the United States was the precursor to the Occupy Wall Street Movement that spread to up to 80 countries. The protest's slogan "We are the 99%" aimed to draw attention to the financial power held by a minority. This power is perpetuated by the supposedly corrupt nature of large corporations said to hold overwhelming financial and political control.

A poverty trap, acts as a self-reinforcing mechanism which causes poverty to persist. This vicious cycle of poverty remains a common experience of billions and the emergence of these traps can arise from both market failure and institution failure. On the opposite side to poverty traps are welfare traps, or an over-reliance upon welfare, that creates a perverse incentive to work.

Market failures are the inefficient allocation of goods and services, that can occur in a free market economy. These failures often arise in the pursuit of goals of self-interest that lead to inefficient market outcomes such as Veblen's theory of conspicuous consumption.
