= List of entities that have issued postage stamps (A–E) =

This is a list of entities that have issued postage stamps at some point since stamps were introduced in 1840. The list includes any kind of governmental entity or officially approved organisation that has issued distinctive types of stamp for postal purposes. These include post offices in foreign countries and postal services organised by military occupations, international organisations, colonies, provinces, city-states and some revolutionary movements. The list includes members of the Universal Postal Union that are also listed at postal organisations.

Many of these entities are historic and some were very short-lived indeed. Philatelists and stamp collectors often refer to the entities that no longer issue stamps as dead countries.

The dates are the generally agreed-upon dates of first and last stamp issues. "Date of issue" is taken to mean the date when a particular type or variation was first issued but its usage would often continue for many years. For example, although an entity may have issued its last stamp in 1951, actual usage may have continued until 1960: in that case, 1951 is the last stamp issue date.

Besides the period of which stamps were issued in the name of a particular entity, the list under that entity also bears any other name in which stamps had been issued for territory, name of any other entity which had had its stamps used in that territory, or new names which had subsequently replaced the name of that entity, together with their respective periods.

== List ==
The list has been comprehensively revised to include extra entities and to direct the links away from the country articles to the (proposed) philatelic articles.

=== Afghanistan ===
- Afghanistan 1870 –

=== Aitutaki ===
- Aitutaki 1972 –
- Aitutaki (New Zealand Administration) 1903 – 1932

=== Albania ===
- Albania 1913 –
- Ottoman Empire issues 1870 – 1913
- Foreign Post offices in Albania
- Occupation issues

=== Algeria ===
- Algeria 1962 –

=== Andorra ===
- Andorra (French Post Offices) 1931 –
- Andorra (Spanish Post Offices) 1928 –

=== Angola ===
- Angola 1870 –

=== Antarctic Territories ===
- Australian Antarctic Territory 1957 –
- British Antarctic Territory 1963 –
- King Edward VII Land 1908 only
- Ross Dependency 1957 –
- Victoria Land 1911 – 1912

=== Argentina ===
- Argentina 1858 –

=== Argentine Territories ===
- Buenos Aires 1858 – 1862
- Córdoba 1858 only
- Corrientes 1856 – 1878

=== Armenia ===
- Armenia (pre–Soviet) 1919 – 1923
- Armenia 1992 –

=== Ascension ===
- Ascension 1922 –

=== Australia ===
- Australia 1913 –
- New South Wales 1850 – 1913
- Queensland 1860 – 1913
- South Australia 1855 – 1912
- Tasmania 1853 – 1912
- Van Diemen's Land 1853 – 1860
- Victoria 1850 – 1912
- Western Australia 1854 – 1912

=== Austria ===
- Austria 1850 –

=== Austrian Post Abroad ===
- Austrian post offices abroad
- Austro–Hungarian Military Post 1915 – 1918
- Austro–Hungarian Post in the Turkish Empire 1867 – 1915
- Crete (Austro–Hungarian Post) 1903 – 1914
- Italy (Austrian Occupation) 1918 only
- Lombardy and Venetia 1850 – 1866
- Montenegro (Austrian Occupation) 1917 only
- Romania (Austrian Occupation) 1917 – 1918
- Serbia (Austrian Occupation) 1916 only

=== Azerbaijan ===
- Azerbaijan 1992 –
- Azerbaijan (pre–Soviet) 1919 – 1921
- Nakhichevan 1993 only

=== Azores ===
- Azores (Acores) 1980 –
- Azores (Portuguese Colonial Issues) 1868 – 1931
- Angra 1892 - 1905
- Horta 1892 - 1905
- Ponta Delgada 1892 - 1905

=== Bahamas ===
- Bahamas 1859 –

=== Bahrain ===
- Bahrain 1960 –
- British postal agencies in Eastern Arabia 1948 - 1960

=== Bangladesh ===
- Bangladesh 1971 –

=== Barbados ===
- Barbados (Historic: Barbadoes) 1852 –

=== Belarus ===
- People's Republic of Belarus 1923
- Belarus 1992 –

=== Belgian Post Abroad ===
- Eupen and Malmedy (Belgian Occupation) 1920 only
- German East Africa (Belgian Occupation) 1916 – 1918
- Germany (Belgian Occupation) 1919 – 1920

=== Belgium ===
- Belgium 1849 –

=== Belize ===
- Belize 1973 –
- Cayes of Belize 1984 only
- British Honduras 1866 – 1973

=== Benin ===
- Benin 1976 –

=== Bermuda ===
- Bermuda 1865 –

=== Bhutan ===
- Bhutan 1962 –

=== Bohemia and Moravia ===
See Czech Republic

=== Bolivia ===
- Bolivia 1867 –

=== Bosnia and Herzegovina ===
- Bosnia & Herzegovina 1993 –
- Bosnia and Herzegovina (Ottoman Empire) before 1878
- Bosnia and Herzegovina (Austro–Hungarian Empire) 1878 – 1918
- Bosnia and Herzegovina (Provincial Issues) 1918 – 1921
- Bosnia and Herzegovina (Yugoslav Regional Issues) 1945 only
- Croatian Posts in Bosnia 1992 – 1996

=== Botswana ===
- Bechuanaland 1965 – 1966
- Bechuanaland Protectorate 1888 – 1965
- Botswana 1966 –

=== Brazil ===
- Brazil 1843 –

=== British Antarctic Territory ===
- British Antarctic Territory 1963 –

=== British East Africa ===
- British East Africa 1895 – 1903
- British East Africa Company 1890 – 1895
- East Africa and Uganda Protectorates 1903 – 1922
- Kenya and Uganda 1922 – 1935
- Kenya Uganda and Tanganyika 1935 – 1963
- Kenya Uganda and Tanzania 1965 – 1975
- Kenya Uganda Tanganyika and Zanzibar 1964 only
- Tanganyika 1922 – 1964
- Uganda Protectorate 1895 – 1902
- Zanzibar 1895 – 1967

=== British Guiana ===
- British Guiana 1850 – 1966

=== British Post Abroad ===
- British post offices in Africa – various issues
- Baghdad (British Occupation) 1917 only
- Bangkok (British Post Office) 1882 – 1885
- Batum (British Occupation) 1919 – 1920
- Beirut (British Post Office) 1906 only
- British Post Offices in the Turkish Empire 1885 – 1923
- British Postal Agencies in Eastern Arabia 1948 – 1966
- Bushire (British Occupation) 1915 only
- Cameroons (British Occupation) 1915 only
- China (British Post Offices) 1917 – 1930
- China (British Railway Administration) 1901 only
- Crete (British Post Offices) 1898 – 1899
- East Africa Forces 1943 – 1948
- Egypt (British Forces) 1932 – 1943
- Eritrea (British Administration) 1950 – 1952
- Eritrea (British Military Administration) 1948 – 1950
- German East Africa (British Occupation) 1917 only
- Iraq (British Occupation) 1918 – 1923
- Japan (British Commonwealth Occupation) 1946 – 1949
- Japan (British Post Offices) 1859 – 1879
- Long Island (British Occupation) 1916 only
- Madagascar (British Consular Mail) 1884 – 1895
- Mafia Island (British Occupation) 1915 – 1916
- Malaya (British Military Administration) 1945 – 1948
- Middle East Forces (MEF) 1942 – 1947
- Morocco Agencies 1898 – 1957
- North Borneo (BMA) 1945 only
- Salonika (British Field Office) 1916 only
- Sarawak (BMA) 1945 only
- Somalia (British Administration) 1950 only
- Somalia (British Military Administration) 1948 – 1950
- Tangier 1927 – 1957
- Tripolitania (British Administration) 1950 – 1952
- Tripolitania (British Military Administration) 1948 – 1950

=== British Virgin Islands ===
- British Virgin Islands 1866 –

=== Brunei ===
- Brunei 1895 –

=== Bulgaria ===
- Bulgaria 1879 –

=== Bulgarian Territories ===
- Dobruja (Bulgarian Occupation) 1916 only
- Eastern Rumelia 1880 – 1885
- South Bulgaria 1885 only

=== Burkina Faso ===
- Burkina Faso 1984 –
- Upper Volta 1959 – 1984

=== Burma ===
see Myanmar

=== Cambodia ===
- Kampuchea

=== Cameroun ===
- Cameroun 1915 –

=== Canada ===
- Canada 1851–

=== Canadian Provinces ===
- British Columbia 1865 – 1868
- British Columbia and Vancouver Island 1860 only
- New Brunswick 1851 – 1868
- New Carlisle, Gaspé 1851 only
- Newfoundland 1857 – 1949
- Nova Scotia 1853 – 1868
- Prince Edward Island 1861 – 1873
- Vancouver Island 1865 only

=== Canal Zone ===
- Canal Zone 1904 – 1979

=== Cape of Good Hope ===
- British Bechuanaland 1885 – 1897
- Cape of Good Hope 1853 – 1910
- Griqualand West 1874 – 1880
- Mafeking 1900 only
- Stellaland Republic 1884 – 1885
- Vryburg 1899 – 1900

=== Cape Verde Islands ===
- Cape Verde Islands 1877 –

=== Cayman Islands ===
- Cayman Islands 1900 –

=== Central African Republic ===
- Central African Empire 1977 – 1979
- Central African Republic 1959 –

=== Chad ===
- Chad 1959 –

=== Chile ===
- Chile 1853 –
- Tierra del Fuego 1891 only

=== China ===
- Chinese Empire 1878 – 1912
- Chinese Nationalist Republic 1949 –
- Chinese People's Republic 1949 –
- Chinese Republic 1912 – 1949
- Treaty ports
- Amoy 1895 – 1896
- Chefoo 1893 – 1894
- Chinkiang 1895
- Chunking 1894
- Foochow 1895
- Hankow 1893 – 1896
- Ichang 1894
- Kiukiang 1894 – 1896
- Nanking 1896 – 1897
- Shanghai 1865 – 1898
- Wei–Hai–Wei date not established
- Wuhu 1894 – 1897
- Tientsin: Treaty port stamps from this city are regarded as bogus.

=== Chinese Provinces ===
- Kirin and Heilungkiang 1927 – 1931
- North Eastern Provinces 1946 – 1948
- Sinkiang 1915 – 1949
- Fukien 1949 only
- Hunan 1949 only
- Hupeh 1949 only
- Kansu 1949 only
- Kiangsi 1949 only
- Kwangsi 1949 only
- Manchuria 1927 – 1928
- Shensi 1949 only
- Tsingtau 1949 only
- Szechwan 1933 only
- Taiwan 1945 – 1949
- Yunnan 1926 – 1933

=== People's Republic of China Regional Issues ===
- Central China (People's Post) 1949 – 1950
- East China (People's Post) 1949 – 1950
- North China (People's Post) 1948 – 1950
- North East China (People's Post) 1946 – 1950
- North West China (People's Post) 1949 only
- Port Arthur and Dairen 1946 – 1950
- Shensi–Kansu–Ninghsia 1946 – 1949
- South China (People's Post) 1949 only
- South West China (People's Post) 1949 – 1950

=== Christmas Island ===
- Christmas Island, Indian Ocean 1958 – 1993
- Christmas Island, Australia 1993 -
- Straits Settlements 1901 - 1942

=== Cilicia ===
- Cilicia (French Occupation) 1919 – 1921

=== Cocos (Keeling) Islands ===
- Cocos (Keeling) Islands 1963 – 1993
- Cocos (Keeling) Islands, Australia 1994 -

=== Colombia ===
- Colombia 1859 –

=== Colombian Territories ===
- Antioquia 1868 – 1906
- AVIANCA 1950 – 1951
- Bolívar 1863 – 1904
- Boyacá 1899 – 1903
- Cauca 1886 only
- Cundinamarca 1870 – 1904
- Granadine Confederation 1859 – 1861
- LANSA 1950 – 1951
- New Granada 1861 only
- Santander 1884 – 1903
- Tolima 1870 – 1903

=== Comoros Islands ===
- Comoro Islands 1950 –

=== Congo, Democratic Republic of the ===
- Belgian Congo 1909 – 1960
- Burundi 1962 –
- Congo Free State 1886 – 1908
- Congo Republic 1959 –

=== Congo, Republic of the ===
- Zaire 1960 – 1971
- Katanga 1960 – 1963
- Ruanda – Urundi 1924 – 1962
- Rwanda 1962 –
- South Kasai 1961 – 1962
- Zaire 1971 –

=== Cook Islands ===
- Cook Islands 1892 –
- Penrhyn 1902 – 1928, 1973 –

=== Costa Rica ===
- Costa Rica 1863 –
- Guanacaste 1885 – 1889

=== Crete ===
- Crete 1900 – 1913
- Cretan Revolutionary Assembly 1905 only
- Crete (British Post Offices)
- Crete (French Post Offices)
- Crete (Italian Post Offices)
- Crete (Russian Post Offices)

=== Croatia ===
- Croatia 1991 –
- Croatia (Provincial Issues) 1918 – 1921
- Croatia (Semi–Autonomous State) 1941 – 1945
- Sremsko Baranjska Oblast (Croatia) 1995 – 1997
- Srpska Krajina (Croatia) 1993 – 1995

=== Cuba ===
- Cuba 1855 –

=== Cyprus ===
- Cyprus 1880 –
- Northern Cyprus

=== Czechia ===
- Bohemia and Moravia 1939 – 1945
- Czechoslovakia 1918 – 1939; 1945 – 1992
- Czech Republic 1993 –

=== Czechoslovakia ===
- Czechoslovakia 1918 – 1939; 1945 – 1992

See Czech Republic

=== Dahomey ===
See Benin

=== Danzig ===
- Danzig 1920 – 1939

=== Denmark ===
- Denmark 1851 –

=== Djibouti ===
- Obock (French Colony) 1893–1902
- Djibouti (French Colony) 1894–1902
- French Somali Coast 1902-1967
- French Territory of Afars and Issas 1967–1977
- Djibouti, Republic of 1977 –

=== Dominican Republic ===
- Dominican Republic 1865 –

=== Dubai ===
- Dubai 1963 – 1972

See United Arab Emirates

=== Ecuador ===
- Ecuador 1865 –
- Galapagos Islands 1957 – 1959

=== Egypt ===
- Egypt 1866 –
- Gaza (Egyptian Occupation) 1948 – 1967
- Palestine (Egyptian Occupation) 1918 – 1920
- United Arab Republic 1958 – 1961

=== El Salvador ===
- El Salvador 1867 –

=== Equatorial Guinea ===
- Equatorial Guinea 1968 –

=== Eritrea ===
- Eritrea

1893-1936 (Italian colony)

1993 –

=== Estonia ===
- Estonia 1918 – 1940; 1991 -

=== Eswatini ===
- Swaziland

=== Ethiopia (Abyssinia) ===
- Ethiopia 1894 –
- Etiopia (Italian occupation) 1936

== See also ==
- List of entities that have issued postage stamps (F–L)
- List of entities that have issued postage stamps (M–Z)

== Bibliography ==
- Stanley Gibbons Ltd, Europe and Colonies 1970, Stanley Gibbons Ltd, 1969
- Stanley Gibbons Ltd, various catalogues
- Stuart Rossiter & John Flower, The Stamp Atlas, W H Smith, 1989
- XLCR Stamp Finder and Collector's Dictionary, Thomas Cliffe Ltd, c.1960
