= Postage stamps and postal history of Singapore =

Postage stamps and postal history of Singapore

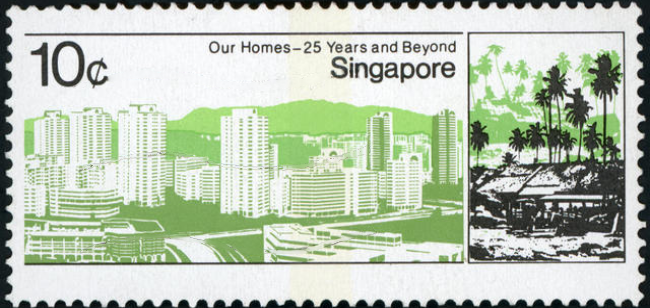
1985 stamp of Singapore, showcasing its residential areas

Postage stamps and postal history of Singapore surveys postal history from Singapore and the postage stamps issued by that country and its various historical territories until the present day. Postal service in Singapore began with the delivery of stampless letters whose cost was borne by the receiving person, later encompassed pre-paid letters carried by private mail carriers and provisional post offices, and culminated in a system of universal prepayment that required all letters to bear nationally issued adhesive postage stamps. Singapore is an island country off maritime Southeast Asia, located between the Straits of Malacca and the South China Sea.

The island, which was then known as Temasek, rose in importance during the 14th century and became an important port, but was destroyed by Portuguese raiders in 1613 and became relatively obscure within the next two centuries. In 1819, British colonist Stamford Raffles established a trading post on the island. Within the next few decades, Singapore grew in importance again, rapidly becoming a major port city as the capital of the Straits Settlements. During World War II, Singapore was occupied by Japan from 1942 to 1945, being renamed Syonan-to. After the war, Singapore reverted to British control, with increasing levels of self-government being granted, culminating in full self-governance and soon after a merger with the Federation of Malaya to form Malaysia in 1963. However, it was a brief union and Singapore would become an independent republic on 9 August 1965.

Today, Singapore had become one of the world's most prosperous nations, with a highly developed free market economy and robust international trading links. It now has the highest per capita gross domestic product (GDP) in Asia, which is 2nd in the world, and it is ranked 9th on the Human Development Index (HDI). Today, the country also ranks highly in categories relating to quality of life, particularly education, housing, human capital, healthcare, life expectancy, safety and transparency.

Throughout its history, there were various postal administrations with corresponding issues of postage stamps in Singapore. Its public postal service is spearheaded by Singapore Post (SingPost), a postal service and courier company that has been the country's designated Public Postal Licensee (PPL), providing both domestic and international postal services. Singapore is a member state of the Universal Postal Union (UPU).

== History ==
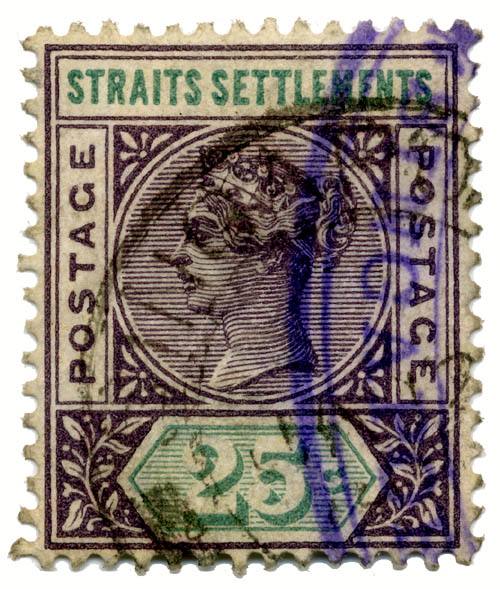
1892 Straits Settlements stamp

A postal service had been available in Singapore since the contemporary city was founded by Stamford Raffles in 1819. Postal services were first directly organised in Singapore in 1826, and from 1829 rectangular postmarks began to be used on local correspondence.

=== Straits Settlements ===
==== Early years ====
Singapore was originally part of the Straits Settlements, being its capital, and stamps for the entire colony was produced from Singapore.

Initially, postal services were under the authority of the military and subsequently under the authority of a "Harbour Master". At the time, the volume of mail forwarded were fairly minuscule, and letters were received and sent in just a single post office to cover the entire city. It was located in the same room as the Harbor Master's office and the "Clerk of the Registrar of Imports and Exports". The entire postal bureau staff in the 1830s consisted of a single official, clerk and a messenger.

==== Larger building ====
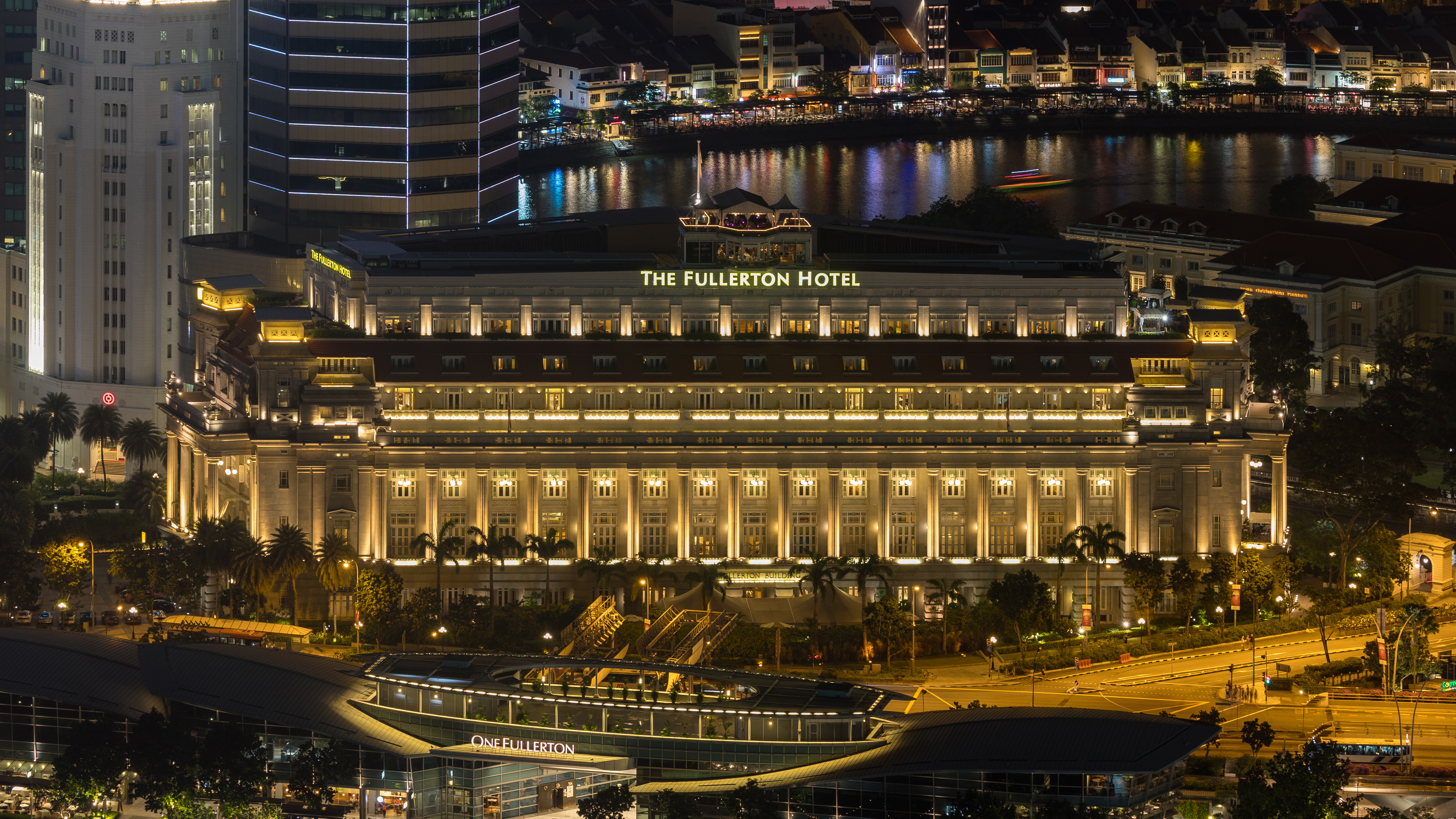
The former General Post Office building, now the Fullerton Hotel

During the 1850s, the post office, then known as the General Post Office (GPO), moved in 1854 to its own building (Note: Now The Fullerton Hotel.) near City Hall, on the banks of the Singapore River, to cope with the growing mail volumes. However, despite the building being much more spacious, its location was often a source of complaints by locals. This was largely due to its location being on the other side of the river of the business district, therefore making visits to the post office rather inconvenient as the river had to be crossed by boat. To alleviate these concerns, a footbridge was built in 1856 across the river and a 1/4 cent coin toll was charged. This bridge was eventually replaced from 1869 by the Cavenagh Bridge, which remains today.

==== Increased traffic ====
As Singapore's trade flourished and postal and shipping traffic increased, the GPO was separated from the Maritime Bureau and became a separate department in October 1858. Between 1819 and 1858, mailed letters had to be turned in at the Post Office. Postage stamps were not used, but a log was kept of all letters received in the Post Office and the names of the sailing ships on which they were forwarded.

Stamped receipts were also issued for all letters received by the Post Office for mailing. For the convenience of locals, a register of their personal postal accounts was kept with arrangements for regular monthly payment of all postage fees. The first postage stamps were not introduced to pay postage until 1854.

During this era, the flagpole on Government Hill (now Fort Canning) was watched with enthusiasm as the raising of the flag during the day or the firing of a cannon at night signified the arrival of a ship carrying mail. Such an event brought considerable excitement to the quiet life of the locals. Upon receipt of mail from the ships that called at the port, the mail clerks at the Post Office would alphabetise all the letters before mailing them, which involved delivery by mailmen. Delivery of mail by oxen or horse-drawn wagon or on foot was at first limited to the city area. Later, mailboxes were set up in the city for mailing, which was then picked up by horse-drawn mail carriages.

=== Japanese occupation ===
During World War II, Singapore was occupied by the Japanese between 1942 and 1945. A postal service was established by the Japanese military administration for the needs of the local population, the soldiers as well as prisoners-of-war (POWs) in Singapore.

For British POWs in particular, mail from the British Islands to the prisoner-of-war camp in Singapore was delivered in several stages. Such correspondence was free to senders and was initially forwarded to the military censorship office in London, from where it was returned to the post office. Then the mail was sent to Tehran, from there to Moscow, from Moscow by train on the Trans-Siberian Railway to Chita, then by the Chinese-Eastern Railway to the Korean port of Busan, from there by sea to the Japanese city of Shimonoseki and finally by land to Tokyo. At the last stage, letters were transported by sea to Singapore and delivered to Changi Prison. As a result, the mail was in transit for more than a year. The letters and postcards of the POWs were limited to 25 words, and their content was also observed by the Japanese administration.

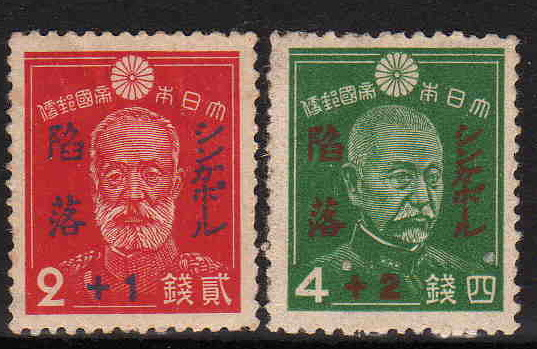
Japanese commemorative stamps issued on the occasion of the Japanese occupation of Singapore in 1942

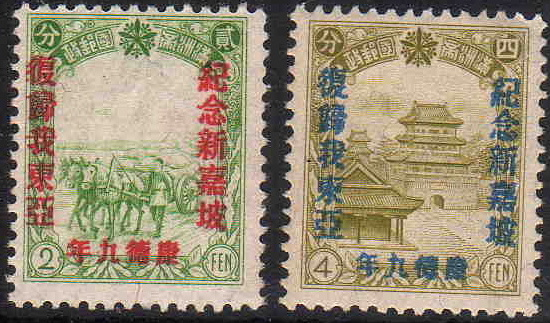
A Manchukuo stamp depicting the Fall of Singapore

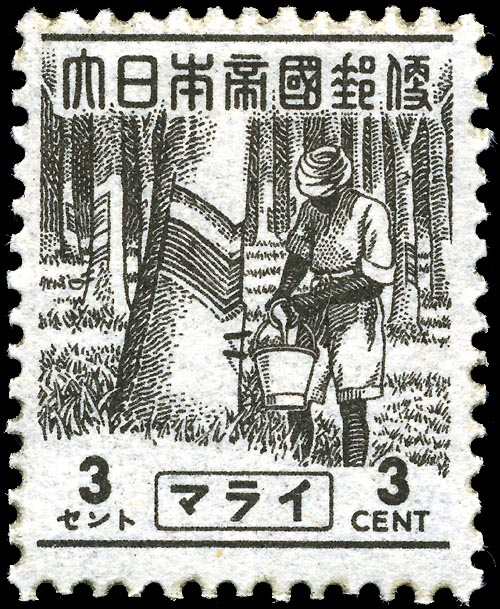
A stamp during the occupation; the stamp was the first Singaporean stamp depicting local scenes and activities

=== British Military Administration ===
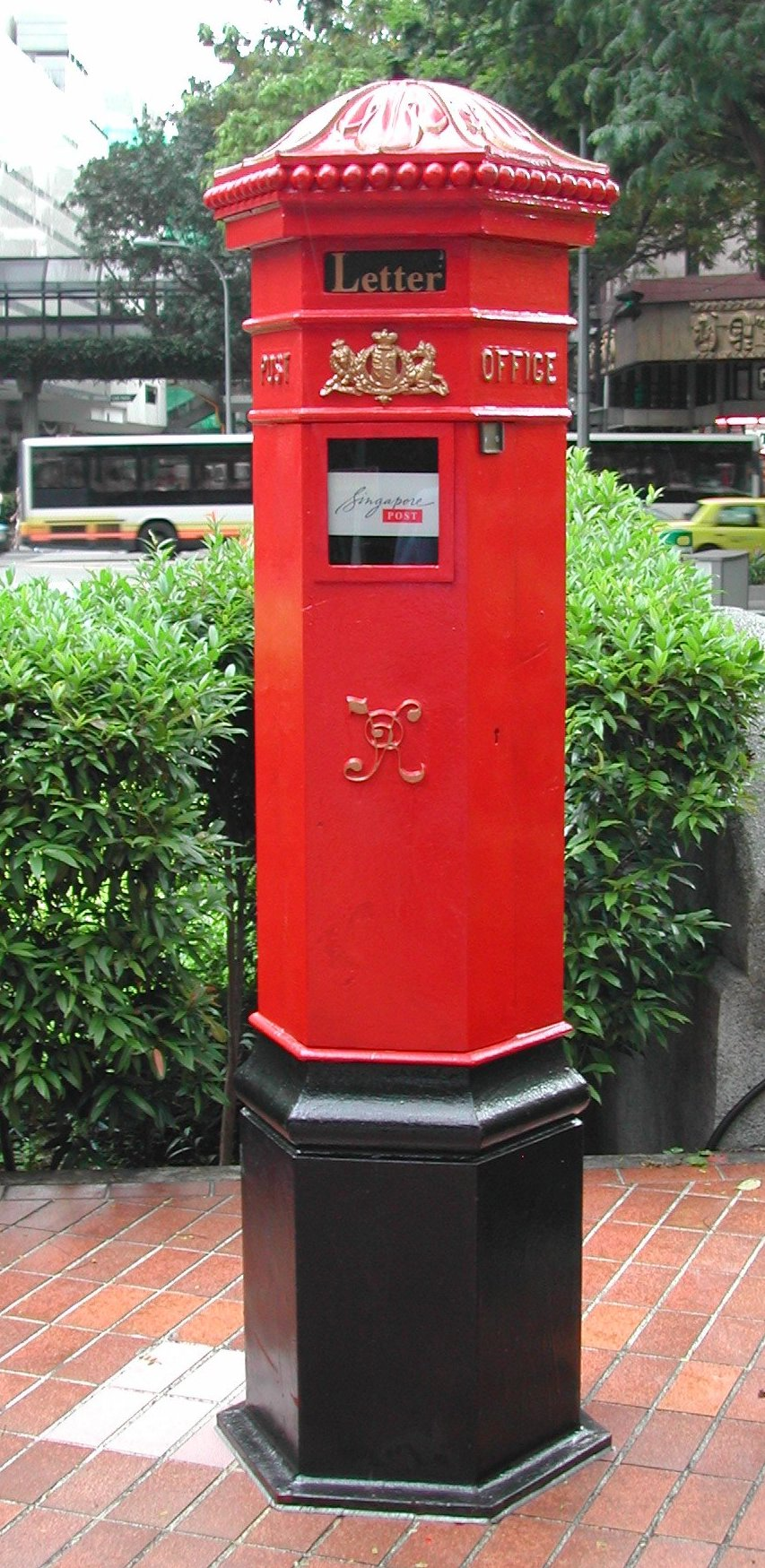
A colonial era standing mailbox in Singapore

After the surrender of the Japanese Occupation forces at the end of World War II, Singapore and Malaya were administrated by the British Military Administration (BMA). Free postage was implemented for a short period from 17 Sept 1945 till 18 Oct 1945. On 19 Oct 1945, Straits Settlements stamps overprinted B.M.A. SINGAPORE/MALAYA were issued for postal use. These stamps were used till 1948, when the first Singapore stamps were issued.

=== Crown colony ===
In 1946, the Straits Settlements were dissolved and Singapore became a crown colony on its own in 1946. The first stamps of Singapore were issued on 1 September 1948 and were similar to stamps of the Straits Settlements, but inscribed SINGAPORE at the foot. Stamps were issued for the omnibus series of the Royal Silver Wedding (1948), the 75th Anniversary of the Universal Postal Union (1949) and the Coronation of Queen Elizabeth II (1953).

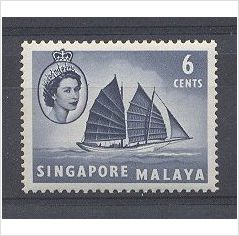
The 1955 definitive series

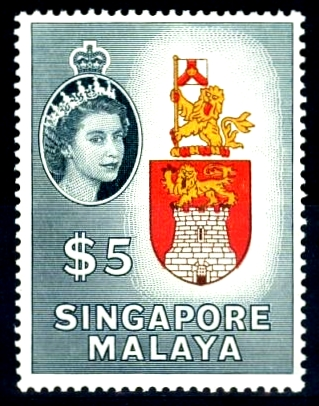
The 1955 definitive series

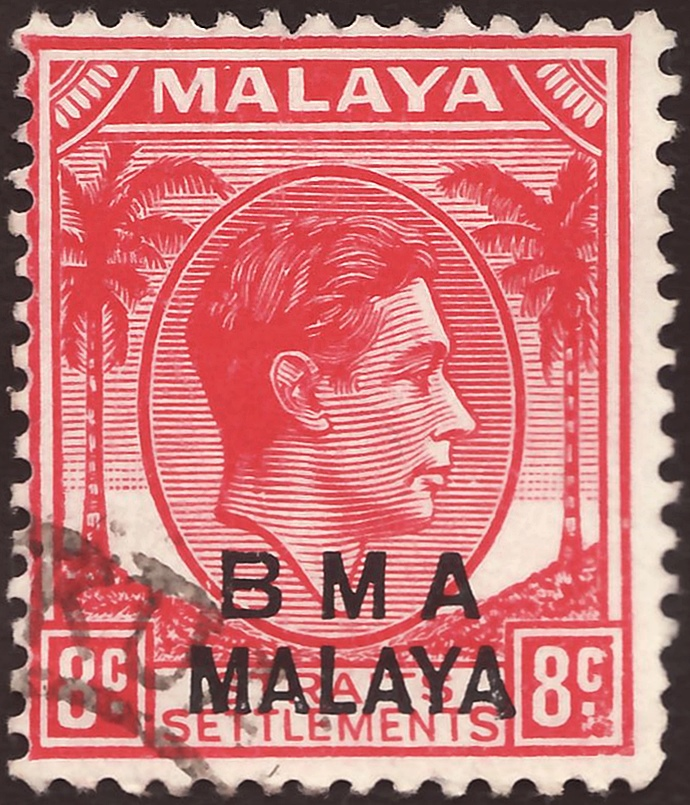
Stamp overprinted by the British Military Administration

=== State of Singapore ===
From 3 June 1959, Singapore became a self-governing state as the State of Singapore. Five sets of commemorative stamps were issued in this period, to mark the New Constitution in 1959 and National Days in 1960, 1961, 1962 and 1963. All were inscribed State of Singapore. Beginning in 1960, the portrait of the British crown no longer appeared on the Singapore postal miniatures, albeit such a series remained in circulation until 1967. In 1962, the post office began issuing a new standard series of stamps depicting orchids, fish and birds native to Singapore, without the portrait of the Queen.

A total of 73 postage stamps were issued in colonial and self-governing Singapore between 1948 and 1963, first "Singapore", and from 1959 "State of Singapore", with English inscriptions. In addition, a long definitive set marked simply Singapore was issued from 1962 onwards.

On 16 September 1963, Singapore briefly merged with the Federation of Malaya along with Sabah and Sarawak to form the Federation of Malaysia.

== Modern Singaporean stamps ==
On 9 August 1965, Singapore was expelled and became a sovereign independent republic. Per the Singapore Act 1966, it was automatically within the Commonwealth of Nations with retroactive effect from the day of independence. Singapore is also a member of various other organisations, including being the headquarters for the Asia-Pacific Economic Cooperation (APEC).

A set of stamps, featuring four men, were issued in 1966 to commemorate the first anniversary of independence marked Republic of Singapore but all later stamps to this day have been marked just Singapore. The exception was a single issue of three stamps with inscriptions in all its official languages: English, Chinese, Malay and Tamil, which was issued in 1967. The stamps had a common design and the inscription in English "Build a Vigorous Singapore", which was also repeated in Chinese, Malay and Tamil.

Singapore started issuing its own postage stamps on a regular basis from 1966. The first Miniature sheet was issued in 1969 and commemorated the 150th anniversary of the city's founding. Until 1981, about 400 stamps were issued in Singapore. Standard stamps were issued in 1968, 1973, 1977, and 1980 and their themes were national dances and musical instruments, flowers, marine life, and ships unique to Singapore.

Commemorative stamps mostly reflected local events and important dates: anniversaries of the Republic, the 150th anniversary of the city, national holidays of the nationalities, and international ones – the Expo '70, the 1973 Southeast Asian Peninsular Games held in Singapore, the 100th anniversary of the Universal Postal Union (1974), International Women's Year (1975), and various other notable occasions. In 1980, in conjunction with the London 1980 International Stamp Exhibition, a series of four denomination postage miniatures were printed, featuring early stamps in circulation in Singapore, as well as a postage block.

Modern Singaporean stamps largely feature paintings, animals from the Singapore Zoo, local birds, flowers as well as landmarks of the country.

== See also ==
- Singapore Philatelic Museum
- Singapore Post
- Postage stamps and postal history of Christmas Island
- Postage stamps and postal history of the Cocos (Keeling) Islands
- Postage stamps and postal history of the Straits Settlements
- Revenue stamps of Singapore
