= David R. Pitts =

David Riley Pitts is an American healthcare administrator, chief executive, and philatelist.

== Early life and education ==
Pitts earned his Bachelor of Science degree from the Fisher College of Business at Ohio State University. He also holds a Master of Healthcare Administration degree from the Graduate School of Public Health at the University of Minnesota and a Master of Arts in public administration from the Hubert H. Humphrey School of Public Affairs at the University of Minnesota.

== Career ==
David Pitts began his career in the United States military and served in hospitals in the United States, England and Vietnam. He served in senior positions in the offices of the Surgeon General of the United States and the Surgeon General of the United States Air Force. He was awarded the Distinguished Service Medal and the Bronze Star.

Pitts was the chief executive officer of the Ochsner Foundation Hospital in New Orleans before founding Pitts Management Associates in Baton Rouge, Louisiana.

Pitts served on Amedisys board of directors for 17 years. He was named non-executive Co-Chairman in February 2014, before resigning in August 2014.

David Pitts is Chairman of the Pitts Family Foundation.

== Philately ==
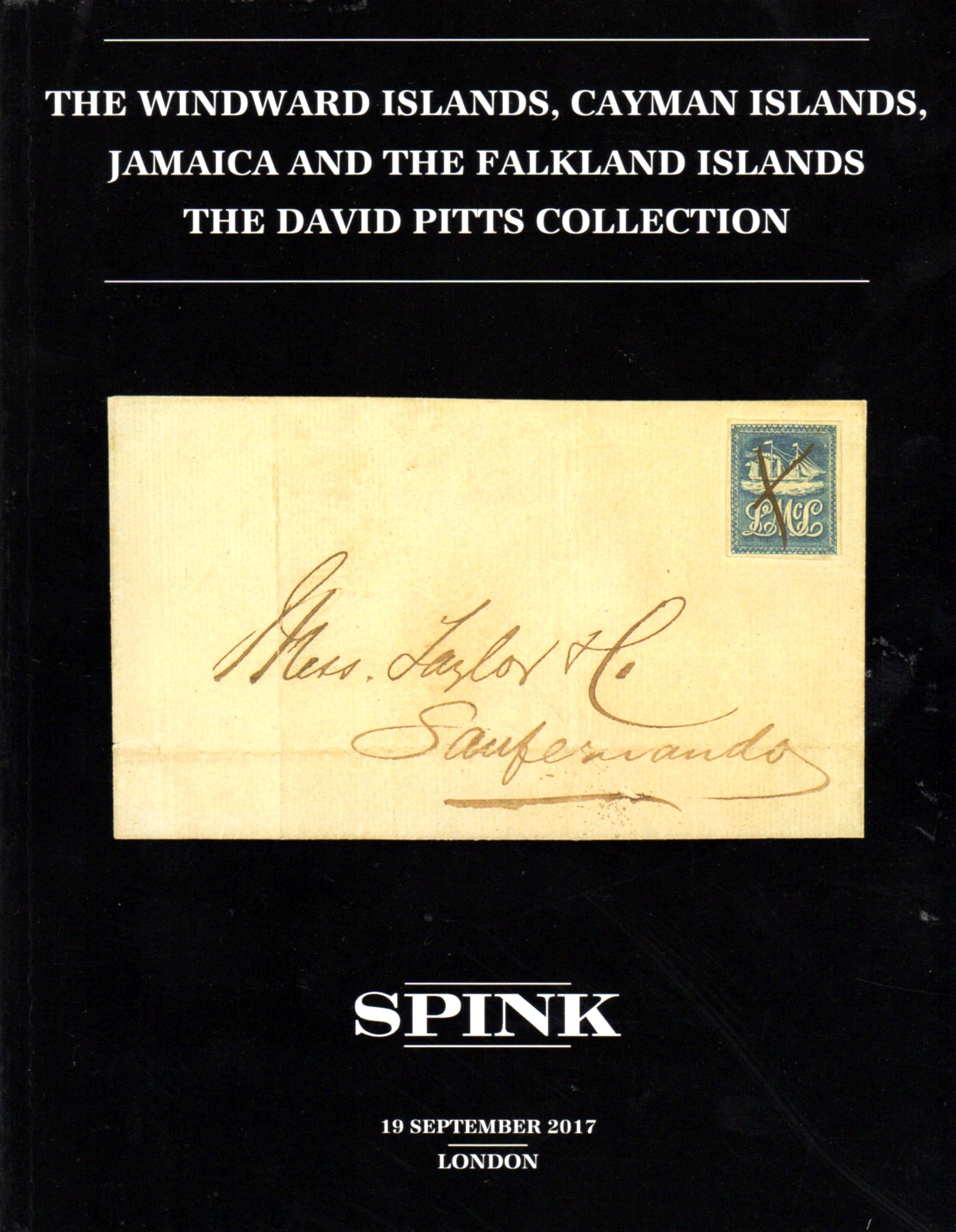
Spink David Pitts auction catalogue showing Lady McLeod 1847 Trinidad stamp on cover

Pitts is a specialist in the philately of Bermuda. His exhibit, Bermuda: Crossroads of the Atlantic has been shown before the members of the Royal Philatelic Society London, of which Pitts is a fellow, and the Collectors Club of New York. The exhibit won a large gold medal at Brasiliana 2013, the only Bermuda exhibit to win a medal at that level.

Pitts in a former president of the Bermuda Collectors Society.

== Personal life ==
Pitts is married to Barbara, an advanced practice nurse and retired lieutenant colonel in the United States Army Nurse Corps. They have seven children.

He is a canon of the Episcopal Church.

== See also ==
- Postage stamps and postal history of the Leeward Islands
