= Postage stamps and postal history of New Brunswick =

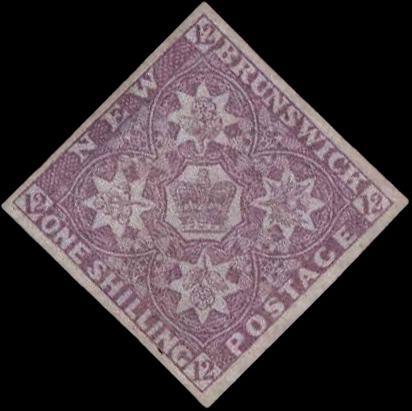
One of the first stamps of New Brunswick from 1851

This is a survey of the postage stamps and postal history of New Brunswick.

== Stamp issues ==
=== First issue ===
A total of eleven stamps were issued by New Brunswick. The first stamps were issued in 1851 and are similar in design to a contemporary set issued by Nova Scotia. This set of three diamond-shaped issues continued until 1860 when the next and final issue was released.

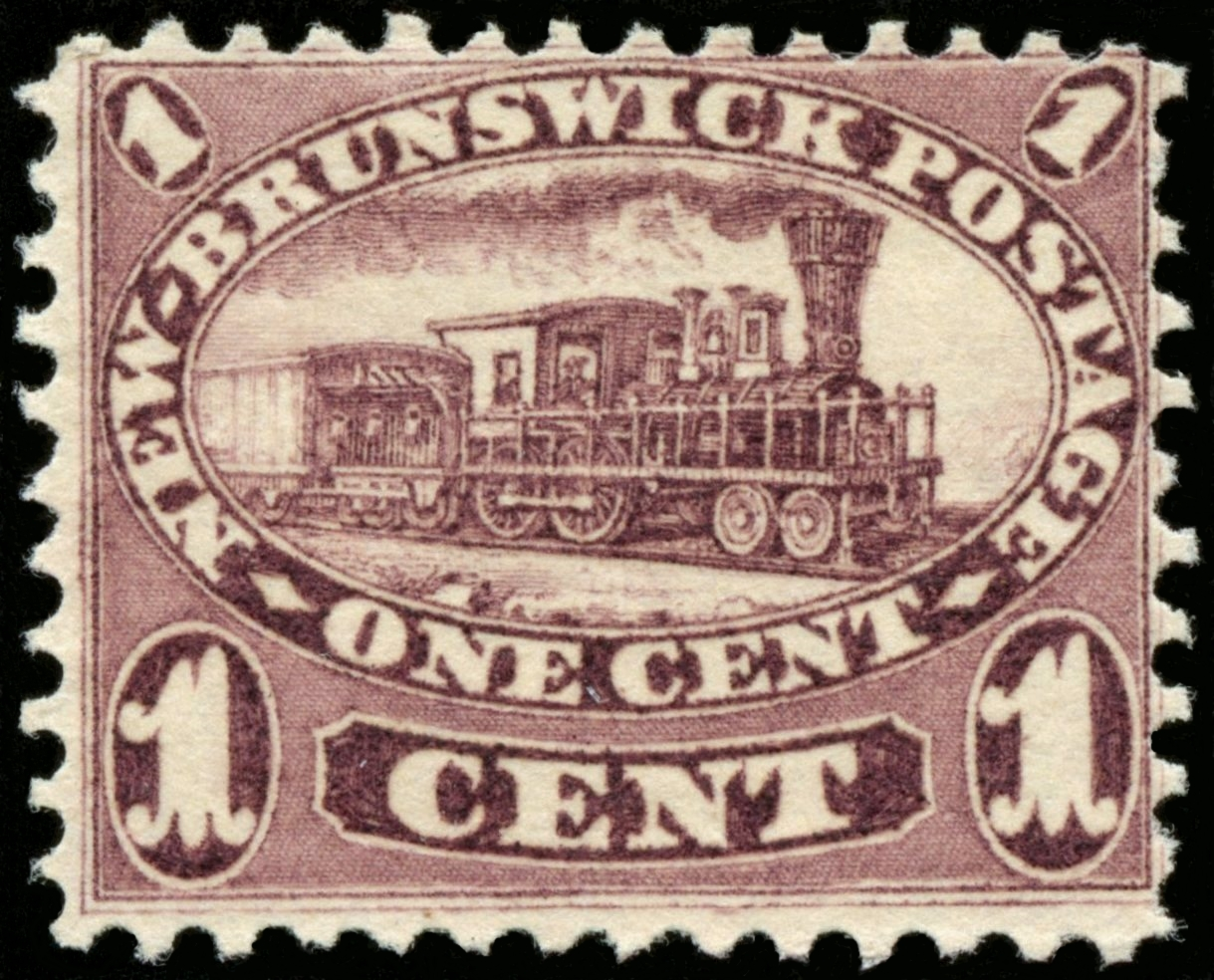
New Brunswick's 1860 decimal issue featured several notable stamps, including this one cent train—the first train ever depicted in a postage stamp

=== Decimal Issue of 1860 ===
Commissioned by the postmaster of New Brunswick Charles Connell, the colony's second issue is notable in several ways. First, it is believed to include the first steam ship (12½ cents) and first steam train ever shown on a postage stamp (relating to the European and North American Railway, of which Mr. Connell was a director), and third because it contained the first commemorative stamp, a 17 cent stamp featuring an image of a youthful Prince of Wales (King Edward VII) wearing highland dress, issued because the Prince of Wales was scheduled to visit the colony in 1860. The most notable aspect of the issue, however, was that the postmaster chose to include his own image on the five cent issue. This caused such a political uproar in the colony that Connell resigned, but not after destroying most of the stamps. The five cent stamp was replaced by one featuring the reigning monarch, Victoria.

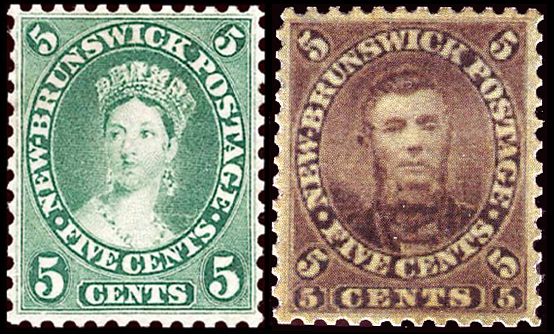
The Chalon head which replaced the initial five cent issue featuring the postmaster's portrait

New Brunswick stamps were superseded by those of the Canada when the colony became part of the Dominion on July 1, 1867.

== See also ==
- Charles Connell
- List of people on stamps of the Canadian provinces
- Postage stamps and postal history of Canada
