= Postage stamps and postal history of Newfoundland =

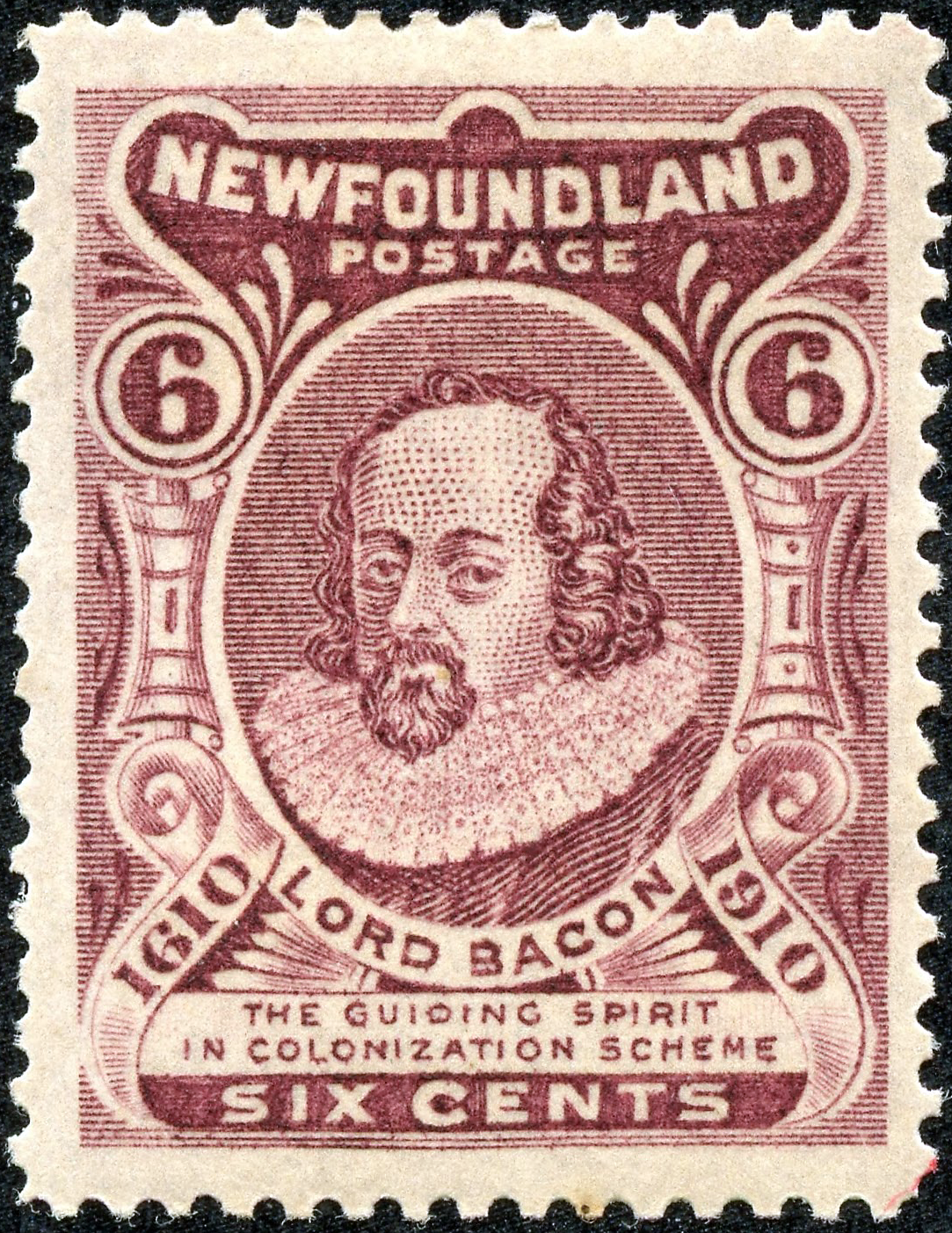
A 1910 stamp of Newfoundland

This is a survey of the postage stamps and postal history of Newfoundland.

Newfoundland is a large Canadian island off the east coast of North America, and the most populous part of the Canadian province of Newfoundland and Labrador. The first postage stamps of the Dominion of Newfoundland were issued in 1857. When Newfoundland entered into confederation with Canada in 1949 the new province stopped issuing its own stamps and adopted stamps already in use for the rest of Canada, although existing Newfoundland issues remain valid for postage. Newfoundland was the centre for attempts at making the first trans-Atlantic flights and several generated both stamps and covers.

== Trans-Atlantic aviation ==
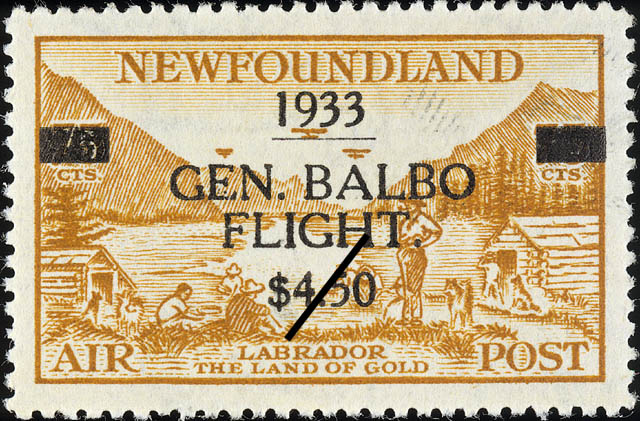
Overprinted 75-cent Newfoundland airmail stamp for the July 1933 General Balbo flight

From 1913, when Lord Northcliffe offered a £10,000 prize for the first nonstop crossing of the Atlantic on a heavier-than-air machine, Newfoundland became the centre for most attempts, notably the successful flight by Alcock and Brown in 1919. Many of these attempts carried mail, franked with Newfoundland stamps overprinted for the occasion. The first flight by a Canadian from North America to England was 9–10 October 1930, in the Wright-Bellanca WB-2 Maple Leaf (a.k.a. Columbia), navigated from Harbor Grace (NL) by the American, Lieut. Harry Connor. This flight was notable for transporting mail bearing a surcharged stamp as a commemorative overprint. In 1933 the Post Office issued a permanent set of four airmail stamps, of which the 75-cent denomination was overprinted for General Balbo's flight two months after their issue.

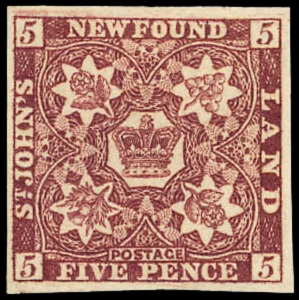
1860 5 pence stamp

== See also ==
- List of people on stamps of the Canadian provinces
- Postage stamps and postal history of Canada
