= Postage stamps and postal history of Prince Edward Island =

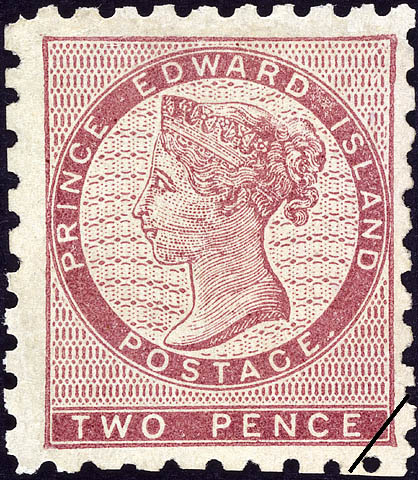
One of the first stamps of Prince Edward Island, issued in 1861

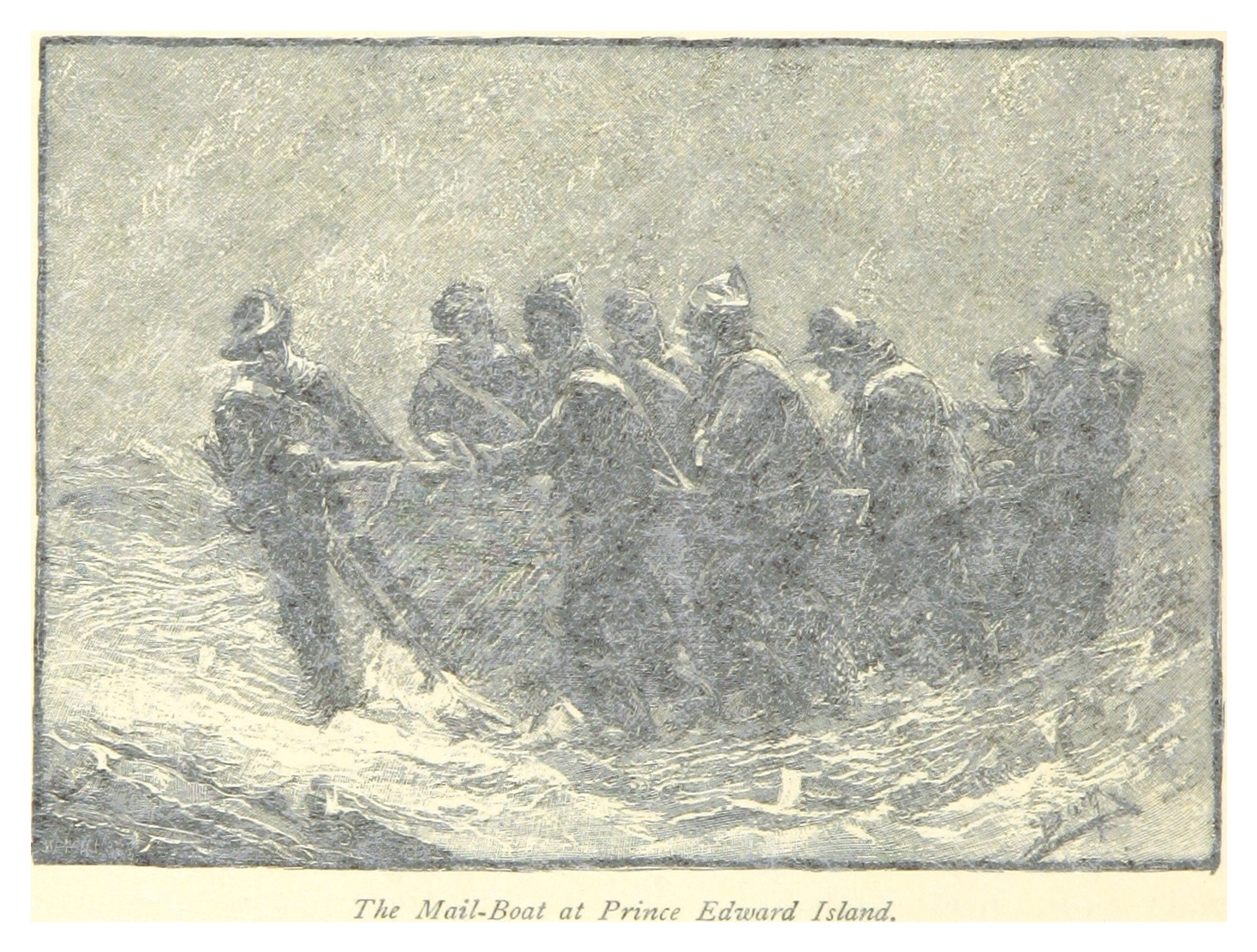
The mail boat at Prince Edward Island (c. 1880)

This is a survey of the postage stamps and postal history of Prince Edward Island.

== First stamps ==
The first stamps of Prince Edward Island were issued in 1861.

== See also ==
- List of people on stamps of the Canadian provinces
- Postage stamps and postal history of Canada
