= Postage stamps and postal history of the British Antarctic Territory =

This half-penny value from the 1963 first issue, depicting MV Kista Dan, was cancelled at the station on Signy Island.

The British Antarctic Territory (BAT) is a sector of Antarctica claimed by the United Kingdom as one of its 14 British Overseas Territories. It comprises the region south of 60°S latitude and between longitudes 20°W and 80°W, forming a wedge shape that extends to the South Pole. The Territory was formed on 3 March 1962, although the UK's claim to this portion of the Antarctic dates back to Letters Patent of 1908 and 1917. The area now covered by the Territory includes three regions which, before 1962, were administered by the British as separate dependencies of the Falkland Islands: Graham Land, the South Orkney Islands, and the South Shetland Islands.

== Bases ==
There are a number of current and former bases in the territory:

- Halley
- Rothera
- Signy was operated from 1947 until 1996 and now is staffed only in the summer.
- Two summer-only forward operating stations, at Fossil Bluff and Sky Blu.
- Faraday was maintained until 1996, when it was sold to Ukraine and renamed Akademik Vernadsky Station.
- Port Lockroy on Goudier Island is a tourist centre operated by the UK Antarctic Heritage Trust.

Mail is found from all of these bases, although most of it is philatelic in nature.

== Postage stamps ==
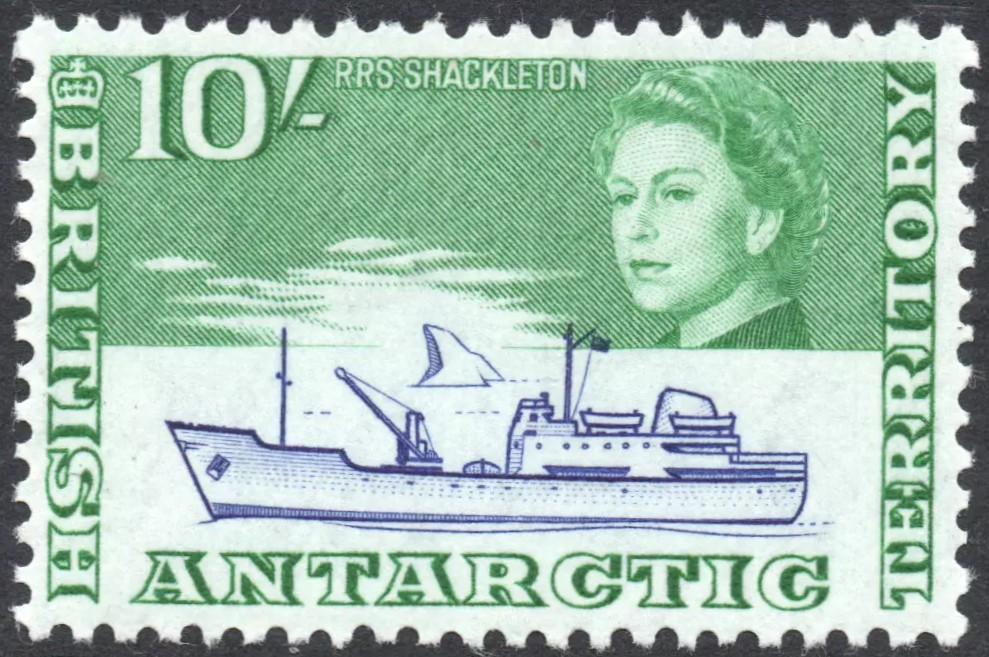
1963 British Antarctic Territory ten shilling stamp featuring RRS Shackleton

All stamps issued to date have been issued during the reign of Queen Elizabeth II. While some are actually used by visiting tourists and resident scientists, the bulk are sold overseas to collectors. The first issue came in 1963, an engraved set with 15 values ranging from ½d to one pound, featuring a portrait of Queen Elizabeth overlooking various scenes of human activity in Antarctica. Several additional issues in the 1960s were followed by a decimalisation issue in 1971 produced by overprinting the 1963 stamps.

Since then, stamps have come out at regular intervals, about 10–20 per year in several sets, with a full definitive series every few years (polar explorers in 1973, plankton in 1984, fossils in 1990, research ships in 1993, etc.). The design topics are related either to Antarctic research or to the native life of Antarctica.

Prior to the establishment of the territory in 1962, stamps were issued for the South Orkney Islands, South Shetland Islands, and Graham Land as parts of the Falkland Islands Dependencies.

All postage stamps of the British Antarctic Territory are denominated in sterling. For more information see British currency in the South Atlantic and the Antarctic

== First day covers ==
The Falkland Islands Philatelic Bureau acts as the sales agent for the British Antarctic Territory. Unlike some Antarctic postal administrations, all official first day cover s are cancelled at the relevant base in the Territory, before being returned to the Philatelic Bureau at Port Stanley for distribution.

== The Antarctic Postman ==
The Antarctic Postman, based at Port Stanley, visits BAT bases by ship to officially release new stamps and the stamps are not otherwise available for sale until this has happened. The date of the visit is recorded and the stamps are then released at the Falkland Islands Philatelic Bureau, at Port Lockroy for tourists, and elsewhere.

== Bibliography ==
- Heijtz, Stefan. Specialised Stamp Catalogue of The Falkland Islands and Dependencies including postal history and cancellations, 1800–2013, with British Antarctic Territory. Stockholm: S. Heijtz, 2014 272p.
- Pirie, J. H. Harvey. Antarctic Posts and Stamps. Batley, Yorks.: Harry Hayes, 1975 71p.
- Vogel, Hal. Essence of polar philately. American Society of Polar Philatelists, 2008.0862-7
- Youle, John H. Postmarks and Cachets of the British Antarctic Bases and South Georgia; Including: Cachets associated with the royal research ships when in Antarctic waters and the Royal Naval Antarctic patrol vessels HMS Protector and HMS Endurance 1 & 2. Bridlington: J. Youle, 2001 188p. Addendum 2009 here.
