= Postage stamps and postal history of Djibouti =

This is a survey of the postage stamps and postal history of Djibouti, first known as the Obock Territory; it afterwards was known as French Somaliland until being called the French Territory of Afars and Issas.

Djibouti is a country in the Horn of Africa, bordered by Eritrea to the north, Ethiopia to the west and south, and Somalia to the southeast. The remainder of the border is formed by the Red Sea and the Gulf of Aden.

== First stamps ==
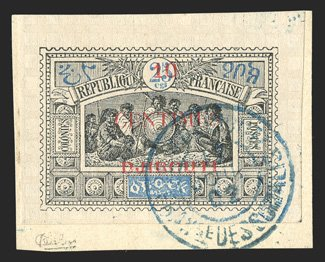
Stamp of Obock surcharged for use in the French Somali Coast, 1902

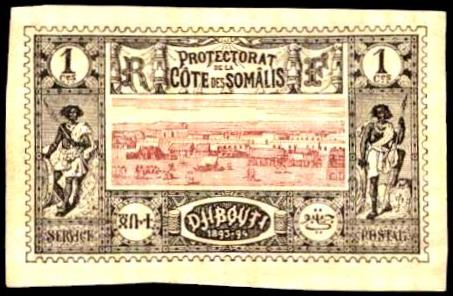
An 1894 imperforate stamp of Djibouti also marked Protectorat Côte des Somalis

After the French administration was moved from Obock to Djibouti in 1894, stamps of Obock were overprinted DJ or Djibouti.

A set of definitives inscribed Protectorat Côte des Somalis / Djibouti was issued in 1894.

== French Somali Coast ==
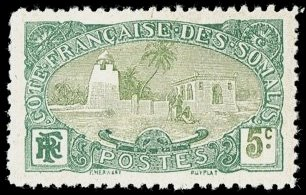
A 1909 stamp of the French Somali Coast showing the Tadjoura Mosque

From 1902 stamps inscribed Cote Francaise des Somalis were issued for the French Somali Coast.

== French Territory of the Afars and Issas ==
A 1970 stamp of the French Territory of the Afars and Issas

In July 1967 the name of the territory was changed to the French Territory of the Afars and Issas and the first stamps under the new name were issued on 21 August 1967.

== Independence ==
The territory obtained independence from France as the Republic of Djibouti on 27 June 1977 and the first stamps of the new republic were issued on that date.

== See also ==
- Postage stamps and postal history of Obock
