= Postage stamps and postal history of the Cocos (Keeling) Islands =

1992 stamps of the Cocos (Keeling) Islands

The postage stamps and postal history of the Cocos (Keeling) Islands are linked to those of the two British colonies and of Australia to which the Indian Ocean archipelago was successively attached.

A postal agency existed there between 1933 and 1937, and has been there permanently since 1952. The archipelago has issued postage stamps since June 1963 and had postal independence from 1979 to 1993. Between 1963 and 1979 with the Australian Post Office and since 1 January 1994 with Australia Post, the Cocos Islands' and Australia's stamps are valid in both these territories.

According to Stanley Gibbons catalogue, the Australian Post Office issued 31 stamps between 1963 and 1979, compared to 264 by the local authority between 1979 and 1993. During the ten first years of postal responsibility, Australia Post issued 112 stamps.

== Before 1955 and the Australian control ==
During World War I, the Battle of Cocos opposed the German Kaiserliche Marine and the Royal Australian Navy for the control of Cocos telegraphic post, that permitted communications between the United Kingdom and the Pacific Ocean Dominions.

A postal agency was opened in the Cocos between 1 April 1933 and 1 March 1937. Postage stamps of the Straits Settlements were available successively picturing Kings George V and George VI. The Cocos were administered by the Settlements.

During World War II, the British forces defended the islands' telecommunication devices against the Japanese advance. The postal agency reopened on 2 September 1952 with stamps of Singapore.

== Under Australian control ==
=== Australian postal territory ===
In 1955, with the independence of Singapore being prepared, the United Kingdom gave control of the Cocos Islands to Australia. The Australian legislation was introduced, including the postage system, stamps and the currency, the Australian pound replacing the Malaya and British Borneo dollar. However the post office was considered a non official one: the local postmaster was paid a commission depending on his financial results.

On 11 June 1963, the Australian Post Office issued six stamps bearing the mention "COCOS (KEELING) ISLANDS", that appeared on all the islands' stamps until late 1993, and illustrated with subjects linked to the islands' life and geography. The series was drawn and engraved by E. Jones.

On 14 February 1966, the Australian decimalisation imposed the use of Australian stamps alone, whose denominations were in Australian dollar and cents. The new definitive series for Cocos Islands in the new currency was issued on 9 July 1969. The twelve stamps pictured local fauna and flora. They were replaced on 29 March 1976 by a new twelve stamp series about the ships of the Cocos history.

=== Philatelic and postal independence ===
In the late 1970s, Australia bought the Clunie-Ross family's property of the islands and gave a large amount of autonomy to the inhabitants. The post service became independent from Australia and issued its two first postage stamps on 1 September 1979 picturing the flag of Australia, map and the atoll landscape on the 20 cents, and the Statutory Council on the 50 cents. Stamps of Australia were no longer valid in the islands.

The philatelic program was entirely printed by printers in Melbourne. Topics were linked to the archipelago and its patriotism: fauna and flora, local and maritime history for the first ones, Australian flag and events of the royal family for the second.

=== Australia Post ===
Following the example of Christmas Island in March 1993, the postal service of the Cocos Islands was transferred from the local authority to Australia Post. Cocos Islands stamps issued since 1994 and bearing the mention "COCOS (KEELING) ISLANDS AUSTRALIA" are valid in Australia and the stamps of Australia are on the archipelago too.

One or two annual issues have been issued since 1994, only about local topics, with a large part about fauna.

== Synthesis ==
Years	Stamps available
Value in Straits dollar.
1933–1937	Malaya / Straits Settlements
Value in Malaya and British Borneo dollar.
1952–1955	Malaya / Singapore
Value in Australian pound.
1955–1966	Stamps of Australia
1963–1966	Cocos (Keeling) Islands
Value in Australian dollar.
1966–1979	Stamps of Australia
1969–1993	Cocos (Keeling) Islands
1994–	Cocos (Keeling) Islands Australia and stamps of Australia
Key
italic	mention on stamps
