= Postage stamps and postal history of the Democratic Republic of the Congo =

This is a survey of the postage stamps and postal history of the Democratic Republic of the Congo, formerly Zaire and the Belgian Congo.

== Colonial period ==
The Congo Free State was established in 1885 as a personal initiative of Leopold II of Belgium, which was formally annexed, becoming the Belgian Congo, in 1907. Both entities issued their own stamps.

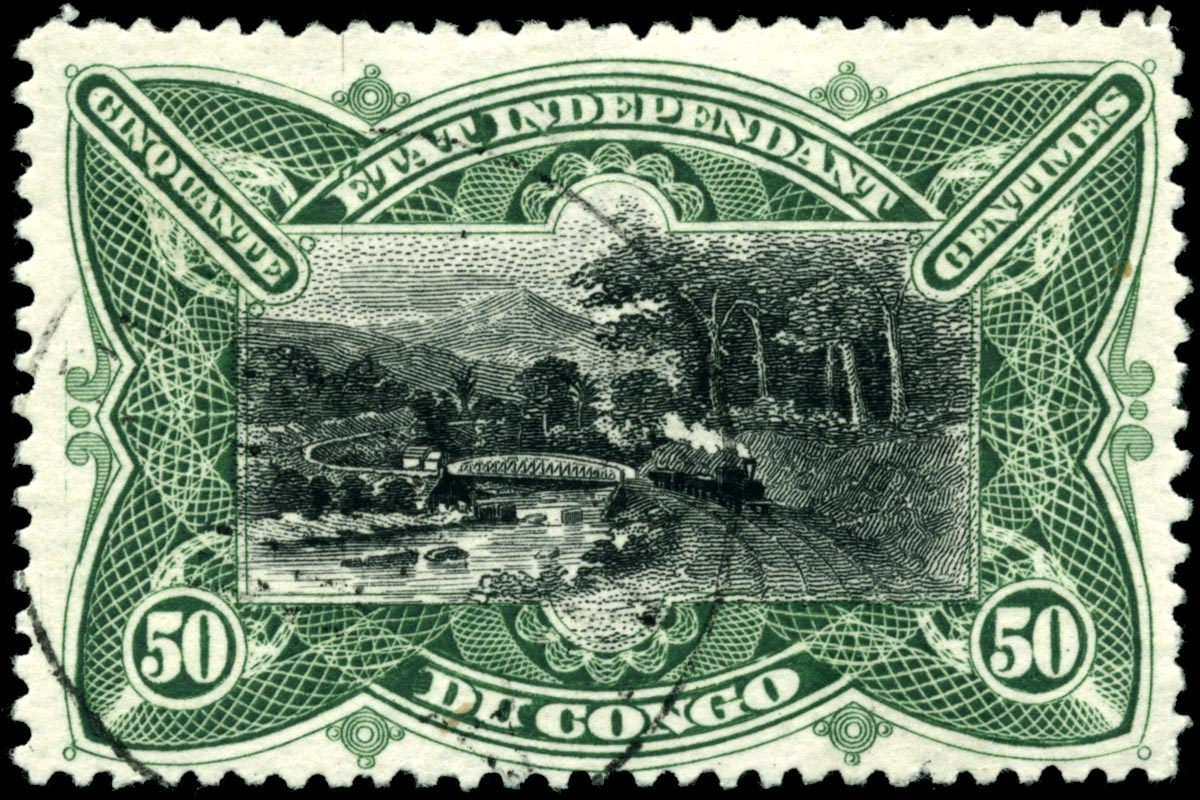
An 1894 stamp of the Congo Free State

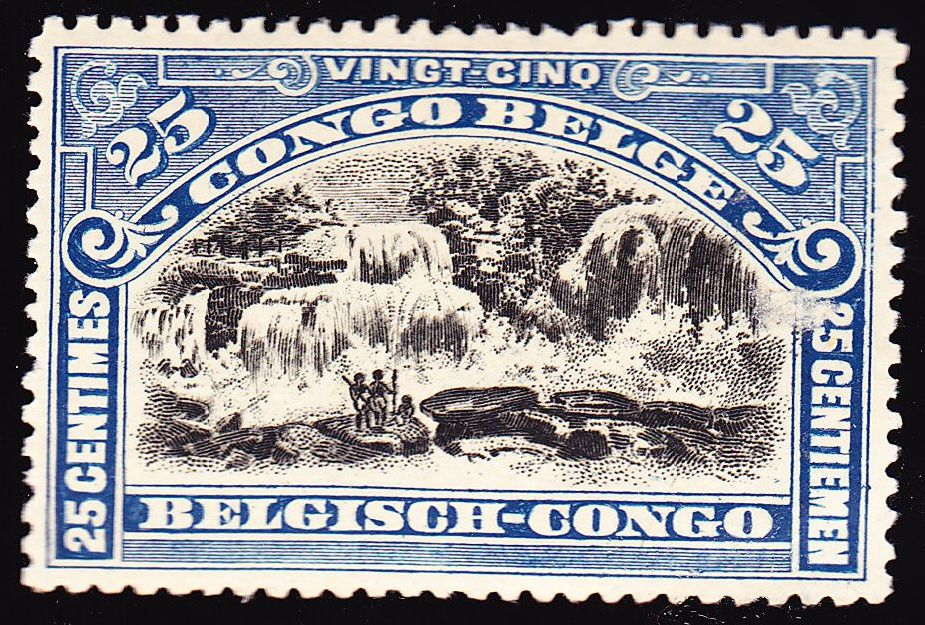
A 1915 stamp of the Belgian Congo

== Republic ==
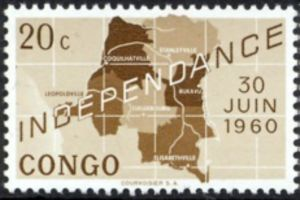
Stamp celebrating independence in June 1960

In 1960, the Belgian Congo became independent as the Republic of the Congo. On 1 August 1964, the state's official name was changed to the Democratic Republic of the Congo.

== Zaire ==
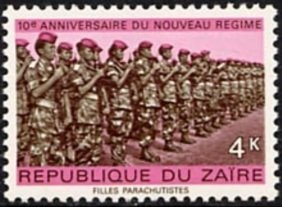
1975 stamp of Zaire

In 1971, the state's name changed to Zaire. The first stamps of Zaire were issued on 18 December 1971.

== 1997-present ==
In 1997 the country's name reverted to the Democratic Republic of the Congo.

== Katanga issues ==
The State of Katanga seceded from the Republic of the Congo and, during its three years of independence, produced its own stamps and issues overprinted on earlier stamps of the Belgian Congo and the Republic of the Congo.

== South Kasai issues ==
For a short period in 1960–61, South Kasai was a secessionist region in the south central area of the country that issued overprinted Belgian Congo stamps.

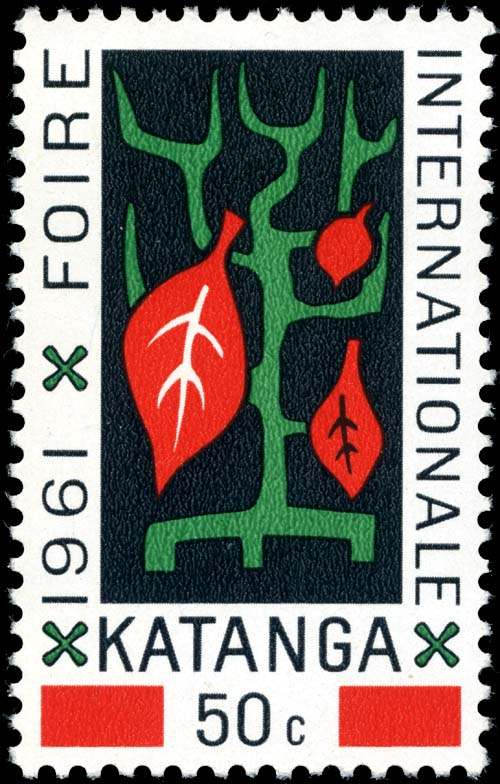
Katanga 50c stamp of 1961

== See also ==
- Postage stamps and postal history of Belgium
