= Postage stamps and postal history of Burkina Faso =

A 2008 stamp of Burkina Faso showing traditional wrestling

This is a survey of the postage stamps and postal history of Burkina Faso, known as Upper Volta until July 1984.

The story of the posts in Burkina Faso begins in the 1890s, with French penetration into the area and the establishment of military posts.

Prior to the creation of French Upper Volta in 1919, postal service in the area was administered by Senegambia and Niger and then Upper Senegal and Niger.

== Upper Volta ==
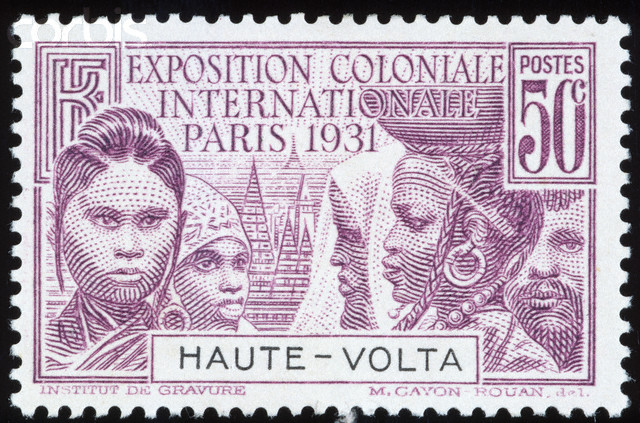
1931 Colonial Exposition Issue of Upper Volta

Upper Volta's first stamps were issues of Upper Senegal and Niger overprinted "HAUTE-VOLTE", appearing in 1920. Overprints and surcharges continued to be issued throughout the 1920s, then superseded in 1928 by a definitive series of 23 stamps featuring three designs: a Hausa chief, Hausa woman, and Hausa warrior. Upper Volta also participated in the Colonial Exposition Issue of 1931.

In 1932 the colony was dissolved and its territory divided between Ivory Coast, French Sudan and Niger.

== Republic ==
Upper Volta was reconstituted in 1947, its postal administration continued to be part of French West Africa until the establishment of the Republic of Upper Volta in 1958.

The Republic operated its own postal system, and issued its first stamp in 1959, marking the 1st anniversary of the Republic, and memorializing governing council president Daniel Ouezzin Coulibaly, who had died recently. In 1960 it issued a definitive series of 18 stamps showing native animal masks, and generally followed a stamp program consistent with other African members of the French Community. On August 5, 1960, it attained full independence from France.

== Sources ==
- Scott catalogue
- Rossiter, Stuart & John Flower. The Stamp Atlas. London: Macdonald, 1986. ISBN 0-356-10862-7
