= Postage stamps and postal history of Cundinamarca =

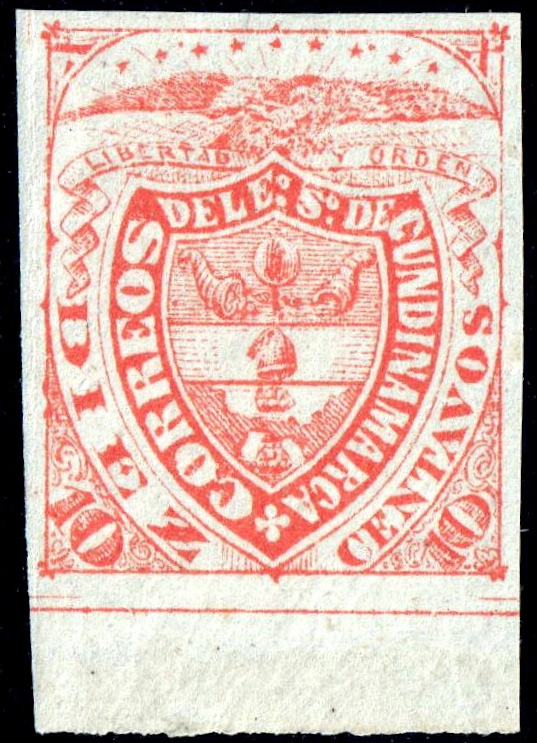
An 1882 stamp of Cundinamarca

Cundinamarca is a department of Colombia, one of the original nine states of the "United States of Colombia".

As with the other states, Cundinamarca once had the right to issue its own postage stamps, and it issued stamps with the state's coat of arms, starting in 1870 and ending in 1904. Many of these are still readily available. There is one rarity, the 2-real provisional stamp from 1883, although there is some doubt as to whether it was sold to the public, since no used copies are known to exist. Likewise, authentic uses of any Cundinamarca stamp on cover are not often seen.

== Sources ==
- Stanley Gibbons Ltd, various catalogues
- Rossiter, Stuart & John Flower. The Stamp Atlas. London: Macdonald, 1986. ISBN 0-356-10862-7
- XLCR Stamp Finder and Collector's Dictionary, Thomas Cliffe Ltd, c.1960
