= British post offices in China =

In the late 19th and early 20th centuries, the United Kingdom set up a system of post offices in various treaty ports of China.

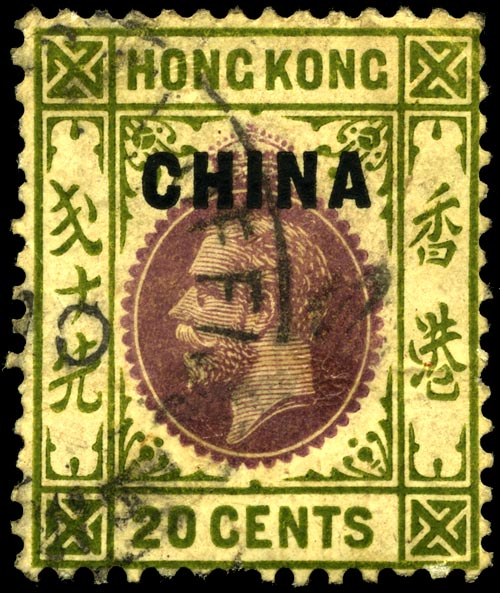
Overprinted Hong Kong stamp, 1917

As a consequence of the Treaty of Nanking of 29 August 1842, Great Britain opened five consular postal agencies on 16 April 1844. Another five were opened later.

- Amoy (1844), Cancelled "A1" 1866–1885; "D27" from 1876 to 1885
- Canton (1844), Cancelled "C1" 1866–1885
- Foochow (1844), Cancelled "F1" 1866–1885
- Ningpo (1844), Cancelled "N1" 1866–1885
- Shanghai (1844), Cancelled "S1" 1866–1885
- Swatow (1861), Cancelled "S2" 1866–1885
- Hankow (1872), Cancelled "D29" 1879–1885
- Kiungchow (1873), Cancelled "D28" 1876–1885
- Tientsin (1882)
- Chefoo (1903)

Initially letters were simply bagged in these cities and carried to Hong Kong, where they were cancelled "B62"; later (1860s/70s) each office received its own postmarking devices.

Postage stamps of Hong Kong were used from 1862 on, but after 1 January 1917 the Hong Kong stamps were overprinted "CHINA". The initial overprinting including 16 values ranging from 1 cent to 10 dollars; from 1922 on, an additional 10 values with the Multiple Script CA watermark were also overprinted.

All of the offices were closed on 30 November 1922 with the exception of those of the Leased Territory of Weihaiwei (Port Edward and Liu Kung Tau) which closed on October 1, 1930.

Weihaiwei was occupied on 24 May 1898, and mail franked with the Weihaiwei local was carried to Chefoo by Cornébé and Co. for onward processing. This lasted until the Chinese Liu Kung Tau Post Office was opened in March 1899, and it was in turn replaced by a British post office on 1 September 1899. A second British Post Office was opened at Port Edward in 1904. Hong Kong stamps overprinted CHINA continued in use in both offices until the settlement was given up on 1 October 1930.

Weihaiwei also had its own revenue stamps.

== British Railway Administration ==
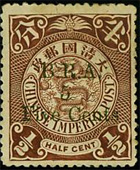
Chinese postage stamp overprinted by the British Railway Administration, 1901

On 20 April 1901 Chinese 1/2c stamps were overprinted B.R.A. / 5 / Five Cents for use by the British Railway Administration in the North China Railway. The stamp was in use for only 30 days and it was used for the collection of the 5c late letter fee. The late fee was abolished on 20 May 1901 and the stamp withdrawn. These stamps exist both with black overprinted characters and green overprinted characters.

== Sources ==
- Stanley Gibbons Ltd: various catalogues
- https://english.chinapost.com.cn/en/folder/2503/5040-1.htm
- Robson Lowe, The Encyclopedia of British Empire Postage Stamps, Vol. 3, Pt. 3, London, Robson Lowe Ltd., 1949. Reprinted as Volume 40 of Billig's Philatelic Handbook, pp. 468–477.
- AskPhil – Glossary of Stamp Collecting Terms
- Encyclopaedia of Postal History
- The China Overprints
- Wellsted, Rossiter, and Flower, The Stamp Atlas (Facts on File, 1986), pp. 257–258
- Hong Kong Study Circle
- https://www.iompost.com/our-news/isle-of-man-stamps/consul-general-li-of-the-people-s-republic-of-china-takes-isle-of-man-postal-headquarters-tour/
