= Postage stamps and postal history of Obock =

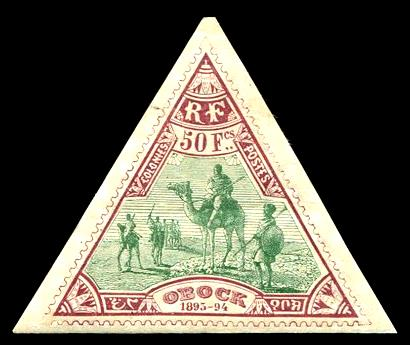
An 1894 stamp of Obock

During its time as a French colony, Obock issued its own postage stamps. At first the inhabitants used the general stamps of the French Colonies, but in 1892 they were overprinted with "OBOCK", as were stamped post cards. Later in the year some of these were also surcharged with values from 1 centime to 5 francs. By the end of the year, a supply of the omnibus Navigation and Commerce issues became available, inscribed OBOCK in red or blue.

1893 and 1894 brought the stamps for which Obock is most famous among philatelists: a series of imperforate stamps with simulated perforations, a scalloped line resembling the outline of a perforated stamps, printed all around the design. In addition, the 2-franc and higher denomination stamps are in the shape of a large equilateral triangle. While the low values are relatively common, the triangular stamps are more scarce.

Although with the departure of the government from Obock, it is hard to believe that much mail came or went from the little port town, used stamps are no more valuable than unused. Authentic uses on cover are not often seen however.

Stamps issued for the whole French Somali Coast superseded the stamps of Obock.

== See also ==
- Postage stamps and postal history of Djibouti
