= Postage stamps and postal history of Santander =

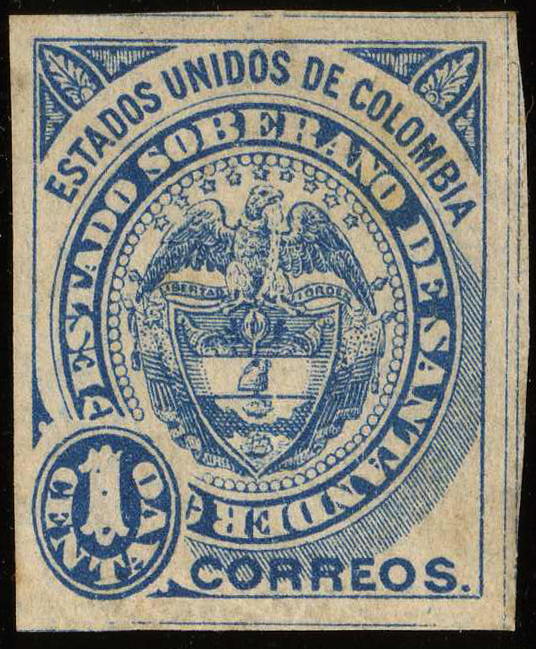
The first stamp of Santander

Like other Colombian states, Santander issued its own postage stamps between 1884 and 1905, with a provisional stamp appearing in 1907. The designs were based on the state's coat of arms, except for a 50c stamp in 1904 featuring a locomotive. All of the stamps of Santander are readily available.

== Sources ==
- Stanley Gibbons Ltd: various catalogues
- Encyclopaedia of Postal Authorities
- Rossiter, Stuart & John Flower. The Stamp Atlas. London: Macdonald, 1986. ISBN 0-356-10862-7
