= Postage stamps and postal history of Nova Scotia =

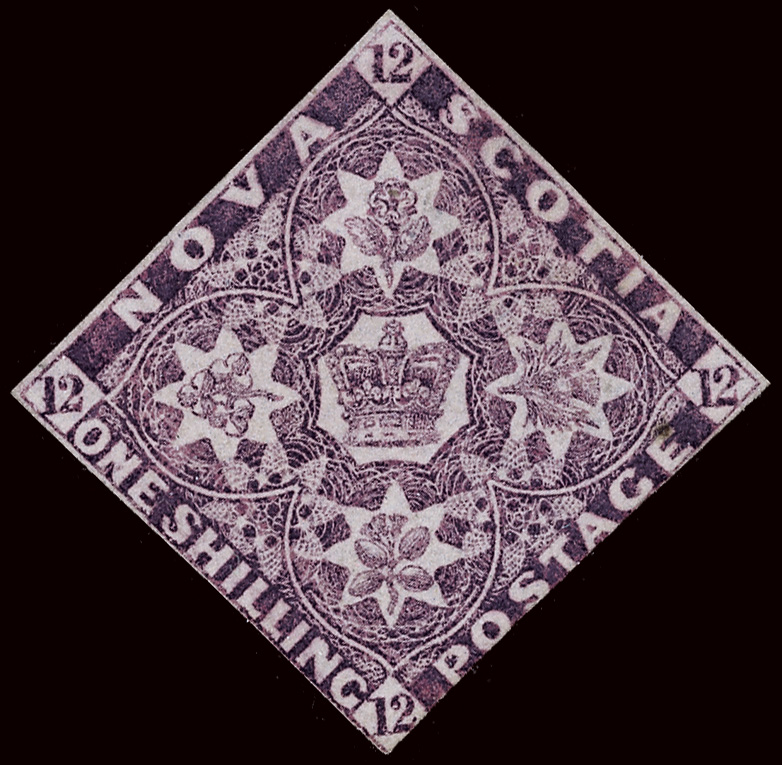
One of the first stamps of Nova Scotia issued 1851

This is a survey of the postage stamps and postal history of Nova Scotia.

== First stamps ==
The first stamps of Nova Scotia were issued in 1851.

== 1863 issue in cents ==
Values 1 to 12 1/2 cents.

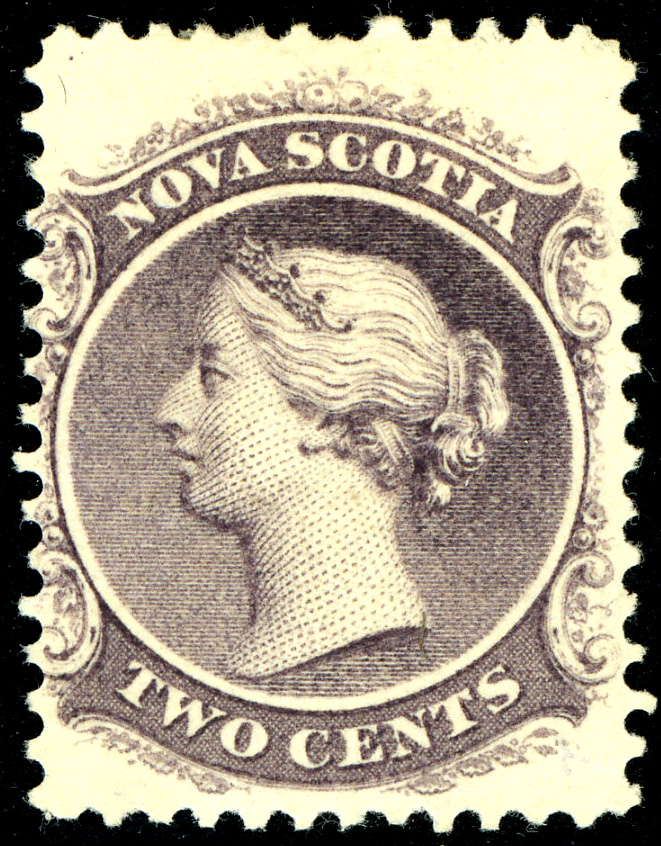
2 cents issued 1863

Nova Scotia joined the Dominion of Canada in 1867.

== See also ==
- List of people on stamps of the Canadian provinces
- Postage stamps and postal history of Canada
