= Postage stamps and postal history of British Columbia =

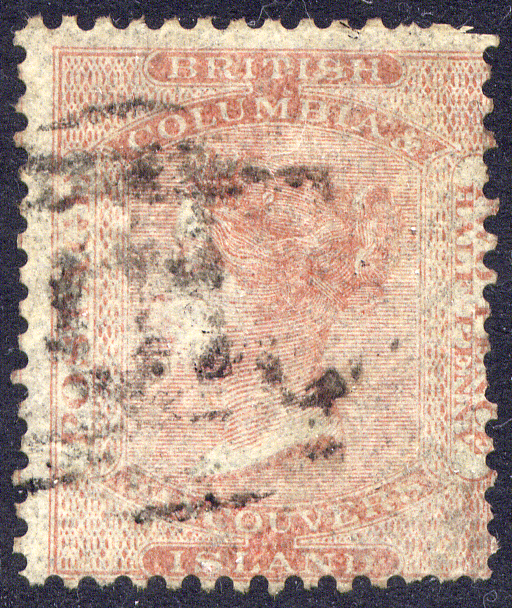
British Columbia and Vancouver Island stamp

The postage stamps and postal history of British Columbia started in 1860 with the issue of a single brownish-rose stamp depicting Queen Victoria in profile and denominated as 2½ pence. It was issued jointly by Vancouver Island and British Columbia as each colony had insufficient postal trade to justify printing separate stamps. In 1862, Vancouver Island adopted decimal currency and sold the stamp for 5 cents, before issuing its own 5 and 10 cent stamps in September 1865. Meanwhile, British Columbia had increased the postal rate to 3 pence but continued to use the unified stamp. In November 1865, British Columbia issued its own stamps and the unified stamp became invalid. In 1866, the two colonies were united as British Columbia.

== Colonies ==
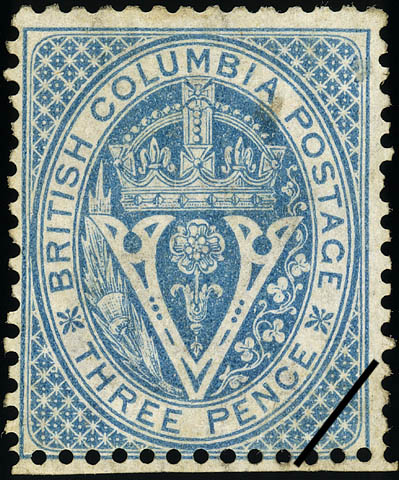
An 1865 stamp of British Columbia

In 1860, the colonies of Vancouver Island and British Columbia issued a postage stamp inscribed with the names of both British Columbia and Vancouver Island. The British Colony of Vancouver Island (also known as Vancouver's Island) was established in 1849, after the Hudson's Bay Company founded Fort Camosack (later Fort Victoria) in 1843.

The Fraser River Gold Rush of 1858 caused an influx of settlers to the mainland, via Vancouver Island, and after this, British Columbia was made a new colony on the mainland. In 1866, the two colonies were united as British Columbia and, in 1871, this became a province of Canada.

== Stamp details ==
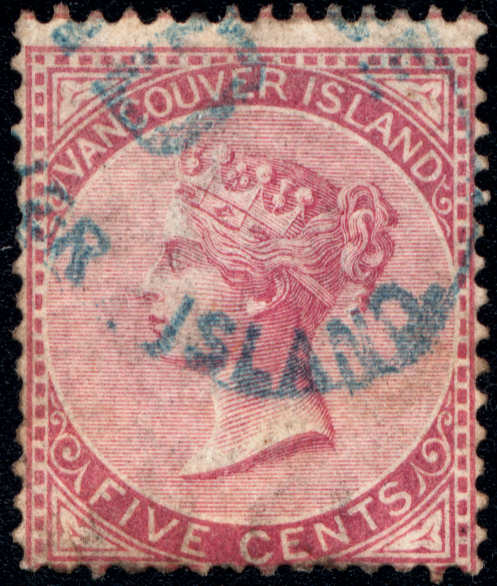
5c stamp issued by Vancouver Island in 1865

The unified stamp was issued for reasons of economy, both colonies having sufficient customers to justify the printing of stamps, but not enough to justify separate issues for each colony. The one stamp was denominated 2½ pence, depicting Queen Victoria in profile, and was surface-printed in a brownish-rose colour by De La Rue. 235,440 were printed.

In 1862, Vancouver Island switched to decimal currency, and sold the unified stamp for 5 cents. It first issued its own 5- and 10-cent stamps in September 1865. In June 1864, British Columbia increased its postal rate to 3 pence, selling the unified stamp for 3d until its own stamps became available in November 1865. Pairs of stamps, used to pay a special rate to Vancouver Island, were also sold at 15 cents per pair. Although after 1865, the 2½d stamp was officially invalid, in 1867 some were made available at a 6¼ cent rate to express mail operators.

The upshot of all this was the single type of stamp was sold for 2½d, 3d, 5c, 6¼c, and 7½c without ever receiving a surcharge indicating a changed value.

The surviving unified stamps sell for about US$250 as of 2003, but much more if they are in good condition and well-centered.

== See also ==
- Postage stamps and postal history of Canada

== Sources ==
- Stanley Gibbons Ltd, various catalogues
- Stanley Gibbons Ltd, British Commonwealth 1966, Stanley Gibbons Ltd, 1965
- Rossiter, Stuart & John Flower. The Stamp Atlas. London: Macdonald, 1986. ISBN 0-356-10862-7
- XLCR Stamp Finder and Collector's Dictionary, Thomas Cliffe Ltd, c.1960
- Robson Lowe, The Encyclopaedia of British Empire Postage Stamps, vol. 5, pt. 4
