= Postage stamps and postal history of Bermuda =

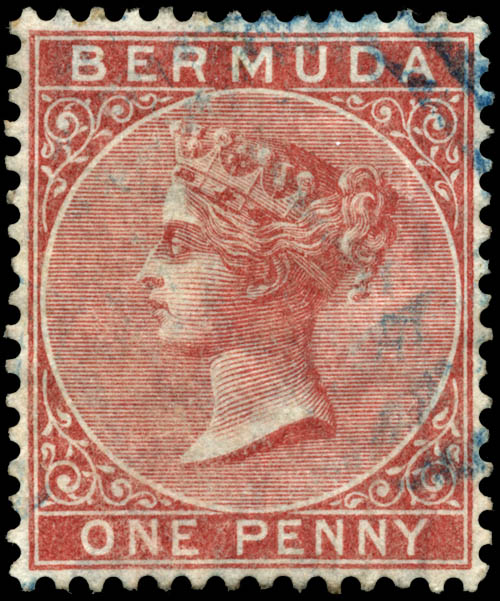
First regular stamp of Bermuda, 1865

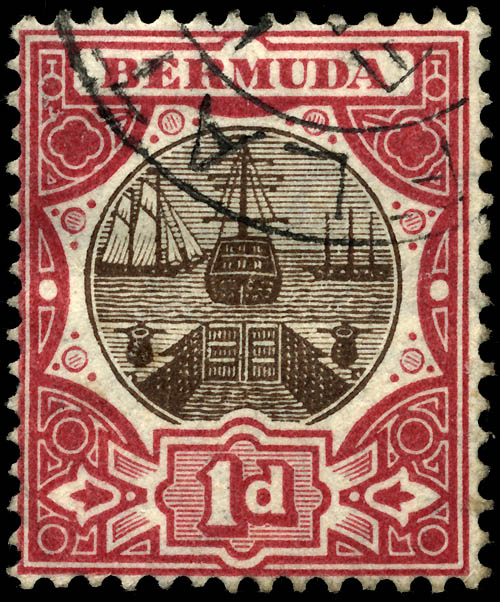
Dry dock stamp, 1906

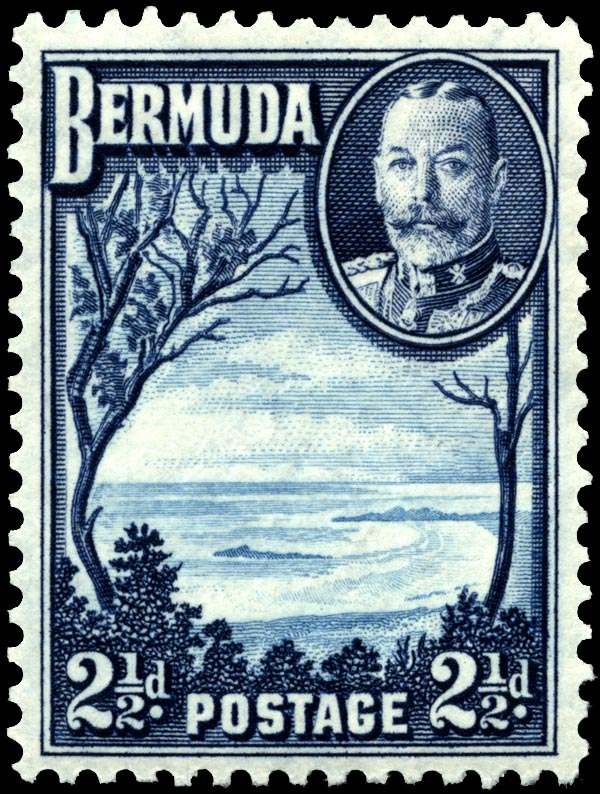
2 1/2d stamp of 1936, depicting Grape Bay

Bermuda, a group of islands in the North Atlantic Ocean, was previously uninhabited when the British established a settlement in 1612.

== Early mails ==
In its isolated location, the colony originally depended on packet ships for mail, connecting via St Thomas, New York City, or Halifax at different periods. A packet agent managed external mails from 1818, with packet handstamps known from 1820.

The Bermuda Gazette operated a domestic mail service from 1784, later taken over by the local government. In 1859, both internal and external mail service became the colony's responsibility, with the chief postmaster being based at St. George's.

== First stamps ==
Bermuda's first postage stamps were produced locally in 1848 by Hamilton postmaster William B. Perot, consisting of the words "HAMILTON BERMUDA" in a circle, with the year and Perot's signature in the middle. Known as the Perot provisionals, they are among the great rarities of philately. A crown-in-circle design used at St. George's in 1860, also rare, is attributed to postmaster James H. Thies.

General stamp issues began in 1865, with a set of three (1d, 6d, and 1sh), each with a different design based on the profile of Queen Victoria. These were supplemented with 2d and 3d values in 1866 and 1873.

In 1902, Edward VII was not honored with a depiction on new stamps; instead the issue depicted a Bermudian dry dock, and remained in use throughout his reign. These were the first stamps in the British Empire that did not depict the monarch's head.

The unusual practice continued, at least in part, with George V of the United Kingdom, with the low values of the issue of 1910 depicting the seal of the colony (a caravel), while the higher values (2sh and up) were large-format designs featuring the king's profile.

== First commemorative stamps ==
Bermuda's first commemorative stamps were an issue of 1920, marking the 300th anniversary of representative institutions. The design consisted of the caravel seal and a profile of George V, with the inscriptions "BERMUDA COMMEMORATION STAMP" above and "TERCENTENARY OF ESTABLISHMENT OF REPRESENTATIVE INSTITUTIONS" below. A second issue, in 1921, commemorated the same occasion with a completely different design, with George V in the centre and various symbols in the corners.

Bermuda issued a pictorial series of stamps in 1936, consisting of nine stamps with seven different designs depicting local scenery. Several of the designs were reused, and three more added, for a 1938 issue featuring George VI.

A commemorative issue of 1949 marked the 100th anniversary of Perot's provisional stamp.

== See also ==
- Revenue stamps of Bermuda

== References and sources ==
Sources

- Scott catalogue
