= Postage stamps and postal history of Christmas Island =

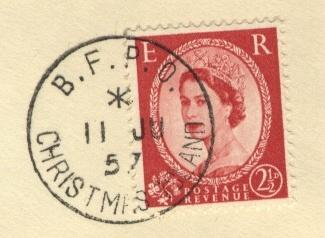
A British Wilding series postage stamp used at a British Forces Post Office on Christmas Island Gilbert and Ellis Islands in 1957

The postage stamps and postal history of Christmas Island, in the Indian Ocean, was linked to its original economic situation until 1993. Mainly ruled by a phosphate production commission, the island was part of the British Straits Settlements colony from 1901 to 1942, then of Singapore from 1946 to 1958. Although it was placed under Australian control in 1958, the island remained postally and philatelically independent until 1993 when Australia Post became the island's postal operator.

The island issued its own postage stamps from 1958. Those issued by Australia Post since 1993 are also valid in Australia, as are Australian stamps in Christmas Island.

According to the Stanley Gibbons stamp catalogue, 32 stamps were issued when postal responsibility was exercised by the Phosphate Commission between 1958 and 1969, and 335 under the responsibility of the Christmas Island Administration between 1969 and 1993. From March 1993 to February 2003, during its ten first years of postal responsibility, Australia Post issued 153 stamps for Christmas Island.

== Linked to the Straits Settlements ==
Christmas Island was annexed by the United Kingdom in 1888 and run by the Christmas Island Phosphate Company since 1899 with European employees and Malayan and Chinese workers. A post agency was opened in 1901, managed by the District Officer, the representative of the Straits Settlements colony on the island. The agency sold stamps of this colony, figuring the British monarch.

Mail travelled between Christmas Island and Singapore with cargo and migrant workers by the ships commanded by the company. Most of the small amount of mail was sent and received by the European part of the population.

During World War II, the Japanese forces invaded the island on 31 March 1942. After the British forces liberated Christmas Island, British Military Administration overprinted stamps of Malaya were in use in the island. The civil postal agency was reopened by the end of 1946.

After these events, the local postal system followed the political changes in British Malaya. Administratively linked to Singapore in April 1946, Christmas Island received this colony's stamps in 1948, but the mail was transported by the Pan Malayan Postal Union.

== Postal independence under Australian administration ==
=== 1958–1959 transition ===
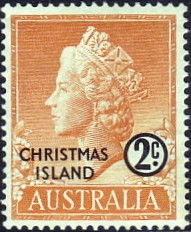
A 1958 2c stamp of Christmas Island

While Singapore prepared its accession to self-government, the United Kingdom decided to transfer Christmas Island administration to Australia, a country which had been controlling along with New Zealand the phosphate company, the British Phosphate Commission, since 1948. The Australian Christmas Island Act accepted the continuity of the Singapore legal system on the island, including the postal system. The Malayan dollar remained the currency because of the needs of South-East Asian workers. Consequently, the island's postal system was independent of Australia's and placed under the responsibility of the Christmas Island Phosphate Commission. Inhabitants could collect their mail at the post office in Flying Fish Cove. For outgoing mail, specific postage stamps would be issued even if the Australian Department of Territories asked the Australian post office to produce them. Postal rates remained those of Singapore, placing this State inside the interior rate zone of Christmas Island.

However, two modifications were made on the Singapore postal system in Christmas Island: the airmail postage rate to Australia was reduced and Australian cancelling stamps were sent in 1958 with the designation: "CHRISTMAS ISLAND / INDIAN OCEAN / AUST".

The first philatelic issue was released on 15 October 1958. It was an adaptation of Australia's 1 shilling 7 pence stamp of March 1955, using a bas-relief profile of Queen Elizabeth II by W.L. Bowles with floral ornament. The design by F.D. Manley was reshaped by engraver G. Lissenden to include a black "CHRISTMAS ISLAND" and encircled value in Malayan dollars overprint. The face values and part of the chosen colours were inspired by the last definitive stamps of Singapore in use in Christmas Island. Stamps were printed in recess for the effigy and the word "Australia" and in typography for the overprint by the Note Printing Branch of the Commonwealth Bank in Melbourne. The philatelic office in Melbourne, in charge of the Australian Territories stamp sales, delivered one hundred stamp sheets to the Phosphate Commission which expedited them to the island by a ship sailing from Fremantle. The same royal effigy served for the registered postal stationery issued on 18 May 1959.

=== Under the Phosphate Commission's postal responsibility ===
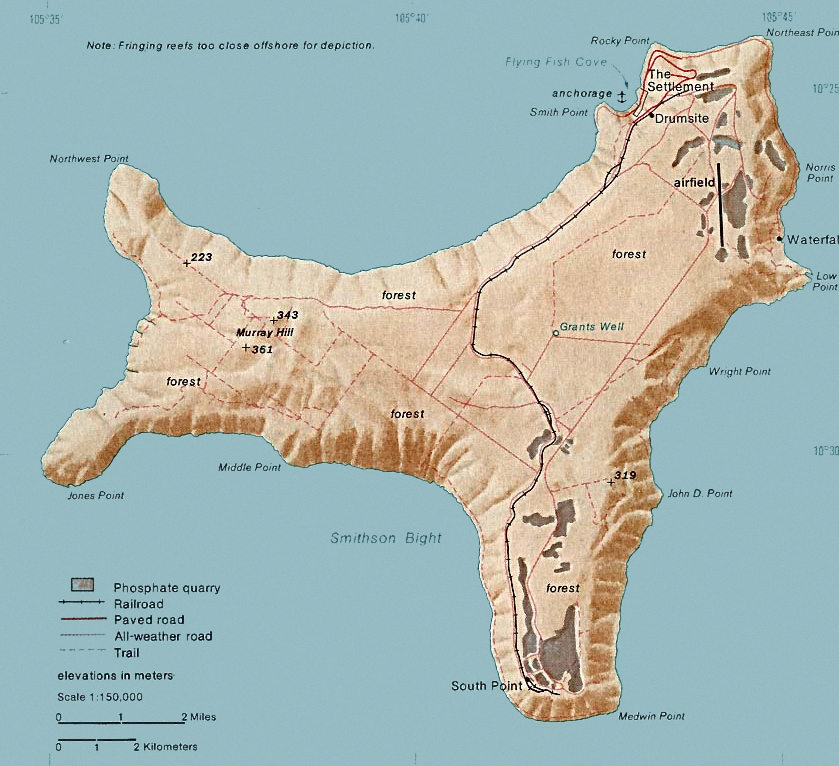
The map of Christmas Island. Its major toponyms and the phosphate mining railway were the subject of the 2-cent stamp issued in 1963.

The first stamps were viewed as a temporary issue, but it took five years to produce the next series. Under the supervision of the Department of Territories, the Stamp Advisory Committee and representatives of the island, the Australian Post Office and Note Printing Branch's artists and printers worked on the project from photographs taken on the island presenting its flora, fauna and mining industry. Finally, ten stamps were scheduled, drawn and engraved by G. Lissenden, Peter Morris and Bruce Stewart. They were issued on 28 August 1963.

Two years later, the island participated in the omnibus issue for the 50th anniversary of the Australian and New Zealand Army Corps landing in Gallipoli during World War I.

These two issues bore the designation "CHRISTMAS ISLAND" without any reference to Australia like the new cancelling datestamps on which the "AUST" abbreviation disappeared. Nonetheless, on 6 May 1968, the monetary and postal systems of Christmas Island were brought closer to the Australian ones: the Malayan dollar was replaced by the Australian dollar and the Australian Post and Telegraphs Act came into force. Local adaptations remained possible, like the localisation in Western Australia of Christmas Island to calculate the postal rates, and the special low rate for letters to Malaysia and Singapore.

A third definitive issue was released on 6 May 1968 too, depicting Indian Ocean fish. This zoological topic was proposed as early as 1966 by the Christmas Island representatives for the second series, who approved artist George Hamori's designs. But the twelve stamps were not issued until 1968 to coincide with the monetary change. The designation "CHRISTMAS ISLAND / INDIAN OCEAN" appeared for the first time on these 1968 stamps and remained in use until 1993.

=== Under the local administration's responsibility ===
On 1 February 1969, postal responsibility on the island was transmitted by the Phosphate Commission to the Christmas Island Administration. It quickly created a philatelic office and in 1971 chose an agent for sale in the rest of the world, the Crown Agents. The stamp program was then decided locally, produced with the Agents' expertise and printed by specialised printers in Europe, and in Australia starting in the late 1980s.

The philatelic program did not surpass four issues per year. The major topics were local: fauna and flora, local history (political, economic and daily life). Christmas became an annual topic from the 1970s due to the name of the island, with some gaps around 1990: the seasonal issue was replaced by mini sheets announcing international philatelic exhibitions.

Mail was moved by the ships exporting phosphate to Australia or the liners to Singapore. In June 1974, the mail transportation took advantage of the establishment of new regular air services between the island, Perth and Singapore.

== Australian postal territory ==
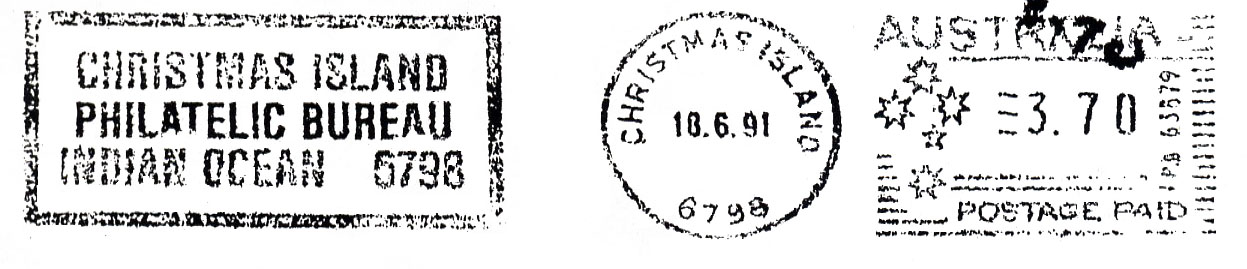
Christmas Island meter stamp type 1

At the beginning of the 1990s, Australia decided to impose full Australian legislation to Christmas Island. In postal matters, starting 2 March 1993, Australia Post became the postal operator of the island and responsible for its philatelic program. Consequently, Christmas Island stamps issued after March 1993 were usable in Australia, and Australian stamps in Christmas Island.

On 4 March 1993 the first five Australia Post stamps were issued with a new designation: "CHRISTMAS ISLAND / AUSTRALIA". The philatelic program topics remained limited. Australia Post promised three issues per year: a Christmas stamp that was issued every two years during the 2000s, a Chinese New Year stamp since 1995 (later a twelve stamp issue after 2002) and one issue on local life.

== Synthesis ==
Dates	Stamps available
Value in Straits dollar.
1901–1942	Malaya / Straits Settlements
1942–1945	Japanese Occupation
1945–1946	Stamps of the Straits Settlements overprinted "BMA / MALAYA"
Value in Malayan dollar.
1946–1958	Malaya / Singapore
1958–1963	Christmas Island / Australia
1963–1968	Christmas Island / Indian Ocean
Value in Australian dollar.
1968–1993	Christmas Island / Indian Ocean
1993–	Christmas Island / Australia and stamps of Australia
Key
"quotation marks"	designation overprinted
italic	designation on stamps
