= List of people on the postage stamps of the Canadian provinces =

List of people on Canadian provincial postage stamps

This is a list of people on the postage stamps of the Canadian provinces prior to joining Canada. Six present day Canadian provinces, before each joined Canada over a period ranging from 1867 to 1949, issued their own stamps. All of them adopted the stamps of Canada when they joined the federation.

== British Columbia ==
- Queen Victoria (1860), used by the two colonies that eventually became the province of British Columbia in 1871

== Province of Canada (present-day Ontario and Quebec) ==
- Prince Albert (1851)
- Jacques Cartier (1855)
- Queen Victoria (1851)

== New Brunswick ==
- Charles Connell (1860)
- Edward VII of the United Kingdom (1860)
- Queen Victoria of the United Kingdom (1860)

== Newfoundland ==
- Prince Albert of Saxe-Coburg and Gotha (1865)
- John Alcock (1919)
- Alexandra of Denmark (1911)
- Arthur, Duke of Connaught (1911)
- Francis Bacon (1910)
- Italo Balbo (1933)
- Arthur Whitten Brown (1919)
- John Cabot (1947)
- Edward VII of the United Kingdom (1868)
- Edward VIII of the United Kingdom (1911)
- Elizabeth I of England (1933)
- Elizabeth II of the United Kingdom (1932)
- Elizabeth Bowes-Lyon (1932)
- Prince George (1911)
- George V of the United Kingdom (1910)
- George VI of the United Kingdom (1911) as Prince Albert
- Humphrey Gilbert (1933)
- Wilfred Grenfell (1941)
- John Guy (1910)
- Harry George Hawker (1919)
- Prince Henry (1911)
- Henry VII of England (1897)
- James I of England (1910)
- Prince John (1911)
- Princess Mary (1911)
- Mary of Teck (1911)
- John Mason (1933)
- Francesco de Pinedo (1927)
- Victoria of the United Kingdom (1865)

== Nova Scotia ==
- Victoria of the United Kingdom (1851)

== Prince Edward Island ==
- Victoria of the United Kingdom (1861)

== Gallery ==
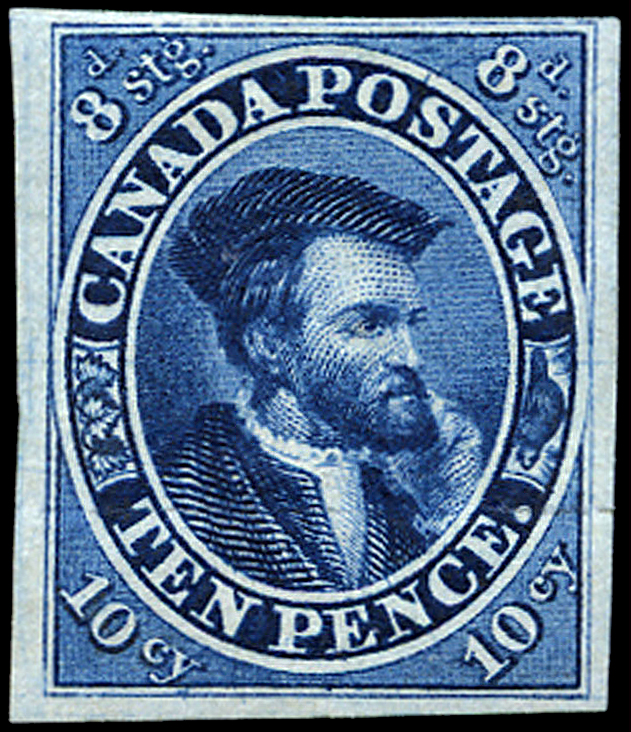
Province of Canada 1855 - Jacques Cartier 10d

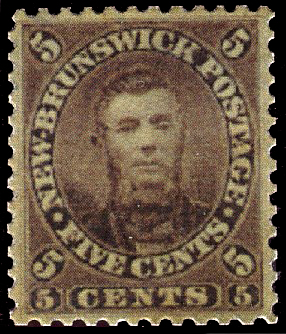
New Brunswick 1859 - Charles Connell 5 cents

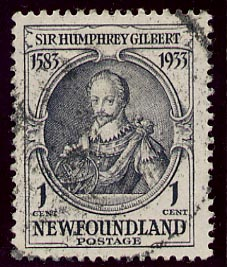
Newfoundland 1933 - Sir Humphrey Gilbert 1 cent

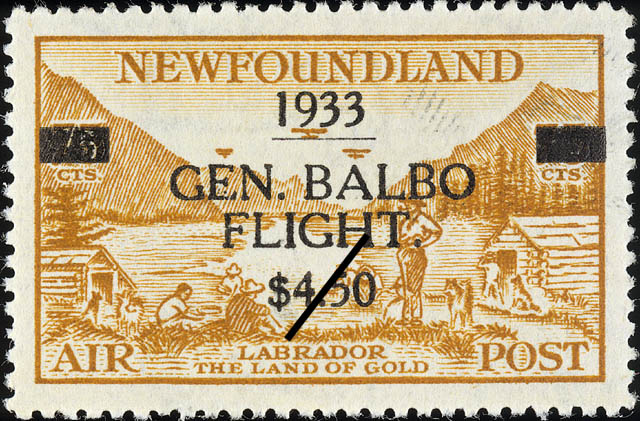
Italo Balbo's 1933 Italian Air Armada $4.50 airmail

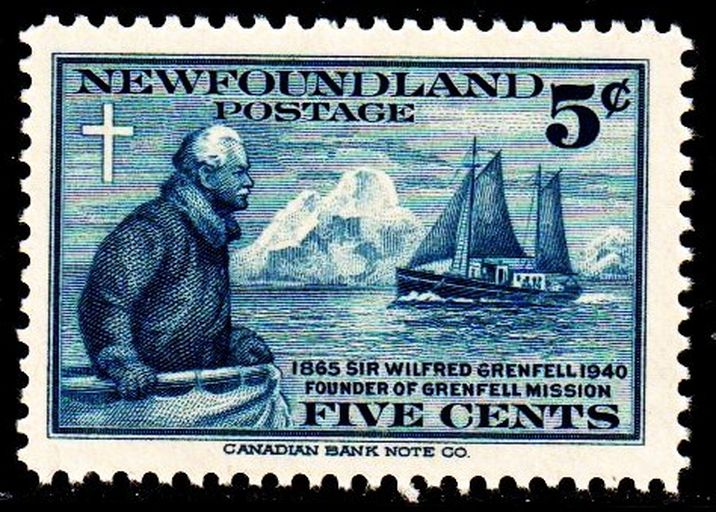
Newfoundland 1941 - Wilfred Grenfell 5¢

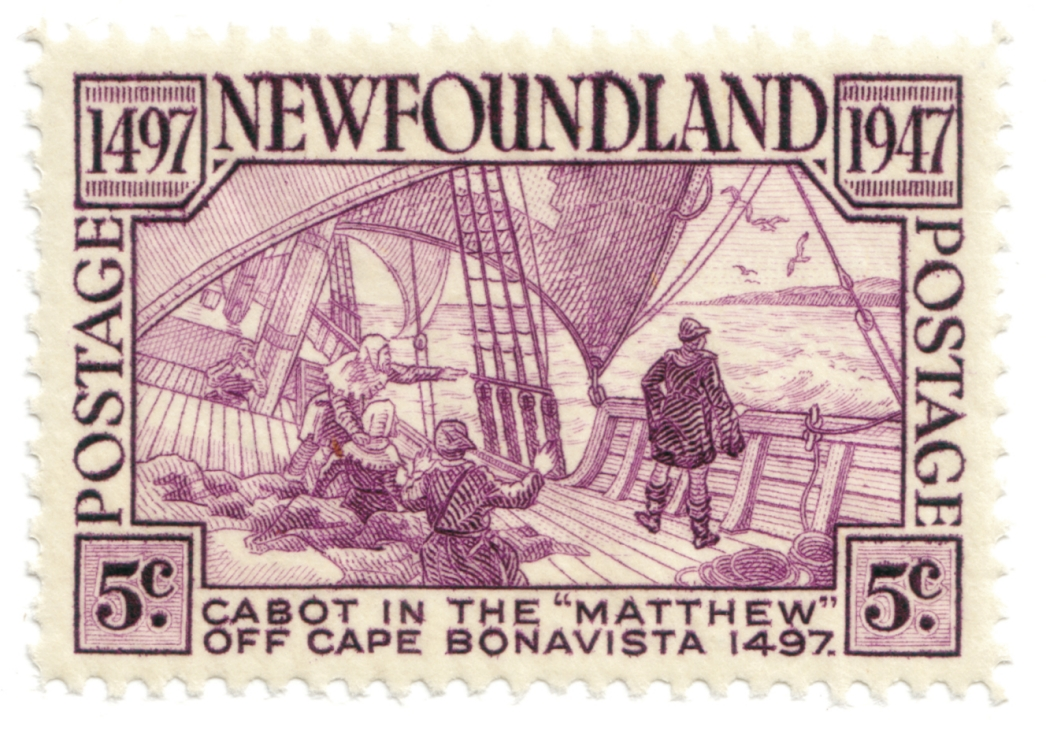
Newfoundland 1947 - John Cabot 5¢

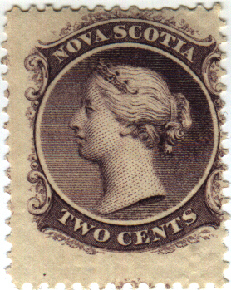
Nova Scotia 1863 - Queen Victoria two cents
