= Postage stamps and postal history of Aitutaki =

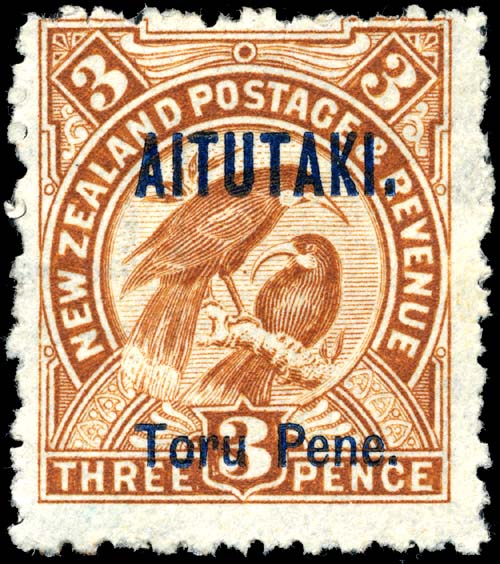
A New Zealand 3d stamp overprinted for use in Aitutaki

The postage stamps and postal history of Aitutaki describes the stamps used in Aitutaki.

== First stamps ==
Aitutaki used the postage stamps of the Cook Islands from 1892 to 1903, when New Zealand overprinted its own stamps with "AITUTAKI." and the denomination written in local dialect. Seven of the eight values were issued in Auckland on 12 June 1903 and in Aitutaki 29 June, with the 2 1/2d arriving later, on 9 November. Similar sets of overprints appeared periodically from 1911 to 1920.

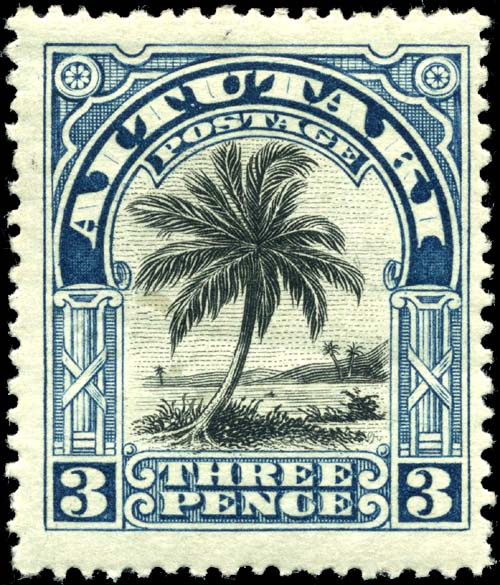
A 3d stamp of Aitutaki from 1920

== Later stamps ==
In 1920, New Zealand produced an omnibus issue for the several Cook Islands, each inscribed with the island's name. A similar idea was used for a set of three in 1924–1927.

On 15 March 1932, stamps of the Cook Islands again replaced the Aitutaki issues. This lasted for forty years.

== Separate postal service ==
In 1972, Aitutaki established a separate postal service, and has issued its own stamps (mostly printed by Heraclio Fournier in Spain) since then. These issues are primarily intended for sale to collectors.

== See also ==
- Postage stamps and postal history of the Cook Islands
- Postage stamps and postal history of Niue
- Postage stamps and postal history of Penrhyn
