= Postage stamps and postal history of Tonga =

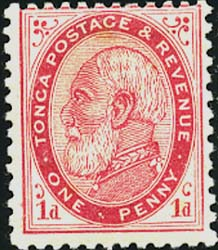
The first Tongan stamp, 1 penny, issued in 1886, that depicts George Tupou I of Tonga

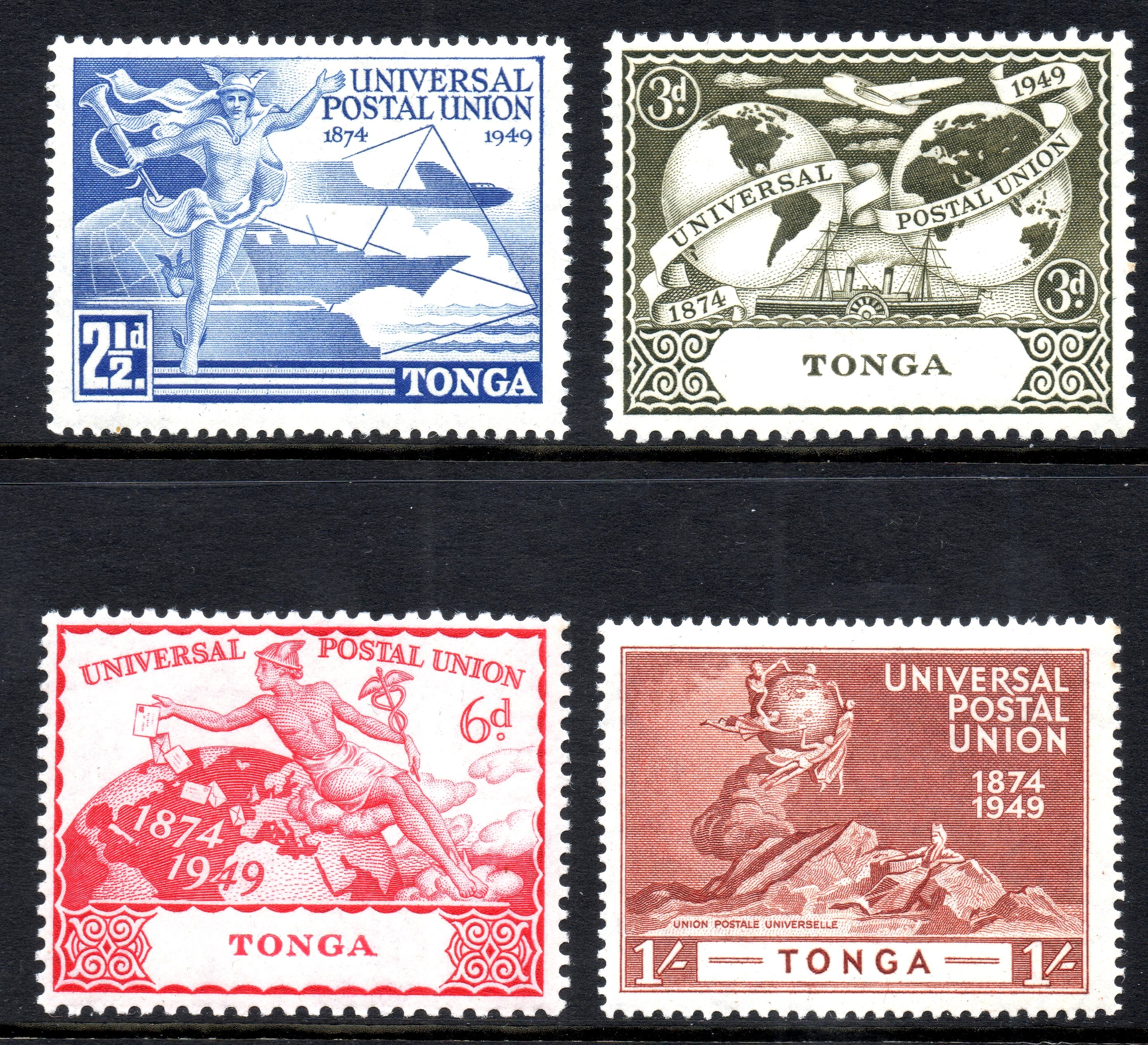
The 1949 U.P.U. omnibus issue of Tonga

The beginnings of the postal history of Tonga can be traced to the Wesleyan missionaries, who landed in the islands in 1826, and sent regular communications back to London and Sydney from the day of their arrival. The Tongan Post Office was established in 1887, but even before then postage stamps featuring the image of King George Tupou I were produced in New Zealand.

== Tin Can mail ==
In the early part of the 20th century, philatelists began seeking out postal cancellations from Niuafo'ou, a volcanic Tongan island. Since Niuafo'ou lacked a deep water harbor to accommodate ships, postal deliveries were received via the so-called "Tin Can Mail" system of having mail thrown overboard in biscuit tins and retrieved by local swimmers. To swim mail out, Tongans adopted the traditional fishing technique of using a buoyancy pole, called a fau, to swim out with a biscuit or kerosene tin to visiting ships. Using the pole for support the swim could take several hours. After a shark killed a Tongan swimmer in 1931, swimming was banned and canoes had to be used. The specially marked Tin Can covers of the 1930s and 1940s became collector's items after an Englishman, Charles Ramsey, became the first and only white man to swim out with the mail. A German trader, Walter Quensell, cashed in on what had become a major tourist attraction with visiting cruise ships, by stamping all the mail and sending it on. There was great rivalry between the two men. Ramsay, who was an agent for Morris Hedstrom Ltd on the island, made 112 swims, many of them at night. Frequently, they lasted for hours in treacherous seas. Ramsay started the practice in commercial innocence but Quensell, who was an agent for the rival trading company Burns Philp (South Seas) Pty Ltd was more shrewd. He set up a shed on the shore and cacheted the covers for the passengers on the cruise liners, in a totally unofficial but rather profitable operation. Ramsey, who had given romance and created world interest in the special mail service, was purposefully exploited by his commercial rival. Quensell never made the swim himself, but his sister-n-law, Pauline Hoeft, a champion swimmer in Australia became the only woman to make the swim, occasionally helping the Tongans.

== Self-adhesive stamps ==
In 1963, Tonga issued the world's first self-adhesive stamps, an event which was celebrated by philatelists. The stamps were also circular in shape and printed on embossed gilt-foiled paper, thus matching the design of the coins being commemorated. Subsequent philatelic issues employed other off-beat designs – including stamps shaped like hearts, birds and fruit – and Tonga continued to issue self-adhesive stamps printed on paper. Although several of the stamps were too big for placement on conventional first-class mailing envelopes, Tonga's unusual postage stamps have become popular with philatelists around the world.

== Recent developments ==
In April 2008, the Tongan government announced the Tongan Post Office would be corporatized. However, the Tongan Post Office was not included in the 2008 effort to privatize other agencies and departments run by the government.

== Niuafoʻou issues ==
Tonga has issued stamps for Niuafoʻou since 1983.
