= Postage stamps and postal history of Penrhyn =

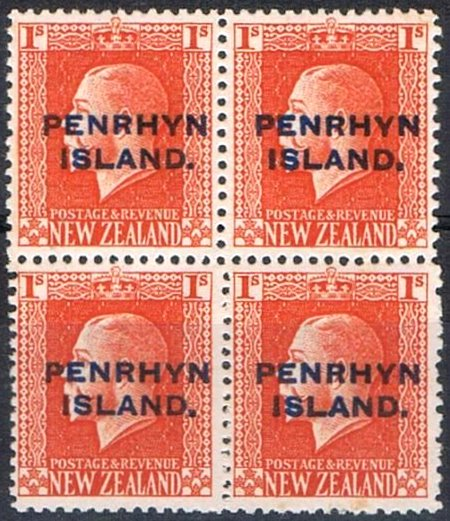
Stamps of New Zealand overprinted for use in Penrhyn

This is a survey of the postage stamps and postal history of Penrhyn.

Penrhyn is the most remote and largest atoll of the 15 Cook Islands in the south Pacific Ocean.

== First stamps ==
The first stamps used in Penrhyn were stamps of the Cook Islands.

From May 1902 overprinted stamps of New Zealand were used. In 1920 and 1927, New Zealand produced omnibus issues for the several Cook Islands, each inscribed with the island's name. These were replaced by stamps of the Cook Islands in 1932.

== Later issues ==
Stamp issues for Penrhyn resumed in 1973.

== See also ==
- Postage stamps and postal history of Aitutaki
- Postage stamps and postal history of the Cook Islands
- Postage stamps and postal history of Niue
