= Coronation issue =

In philately, a Coronation issue is an issue of postage stamps made by the British Post Office and the Post Offices of Commonwealth countries and British dependencies to celebrate the coronation of a new monarch. They were first issued for the 1937 Coronation of George VI and Elizabeth.

These stamps are often considerably more ornate and detailed than definitive issue stamps generated by the same jurisdictions; as such they are greatly favored by many collectors. A particularly favored approach is to attempt to gather all such stamps issued in honor of a particular monarch by all of the jurisdictions issuing them.

== List of Coronation issues ==
- 1937 Coronation issue
- 1953 Coronation issue
- 2023 Coronation issue

== Gallery ==
1937 Coronation issue
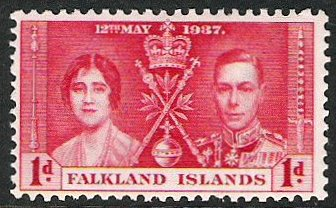
Falkland Islands

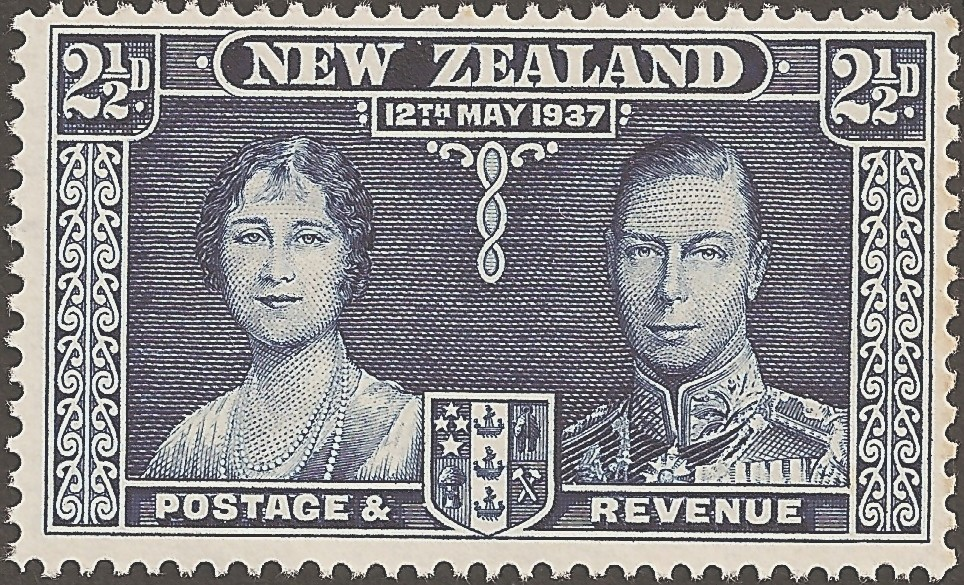
New Zealand

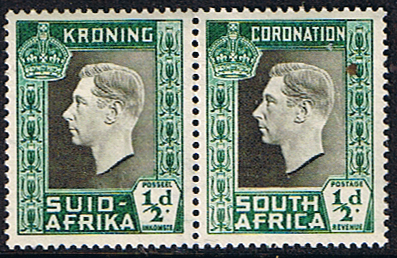
South Africa

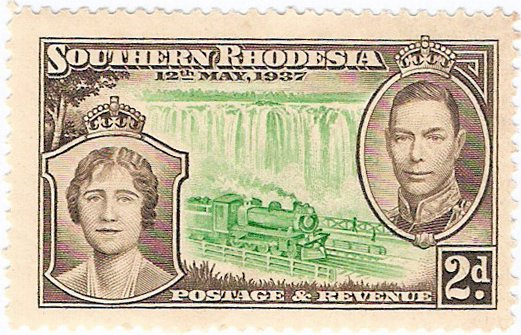
Southern Rhodesia
1953 Coronation issue
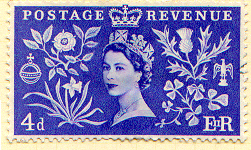
Great Britain

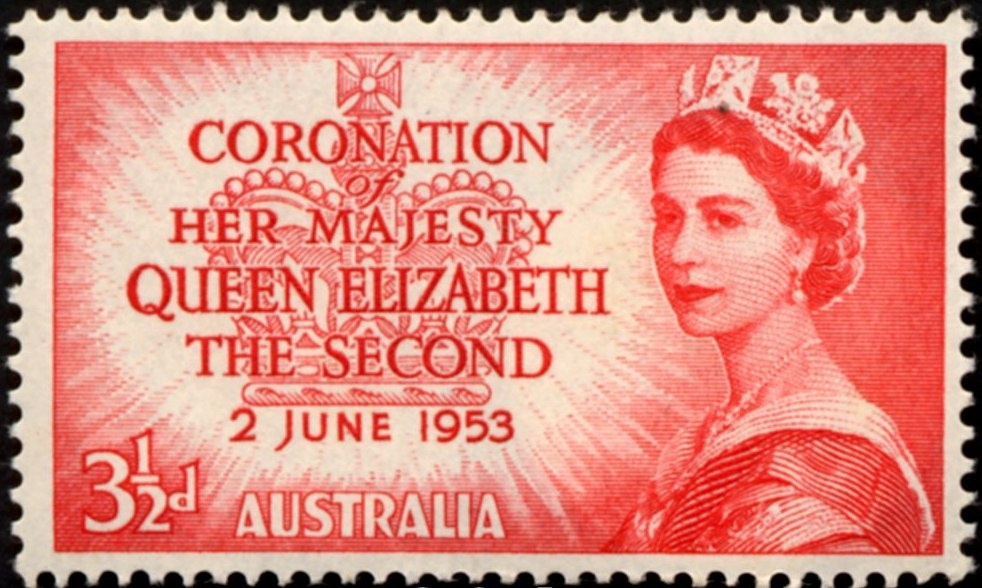
Australia

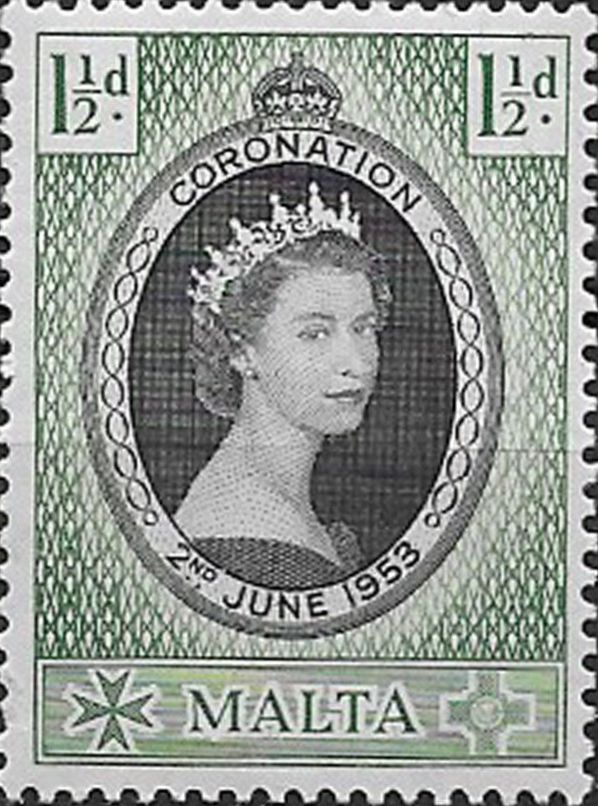
Malta

== See also ==
- Omnibus issue
