= Postage stamps and postal history of Niue =

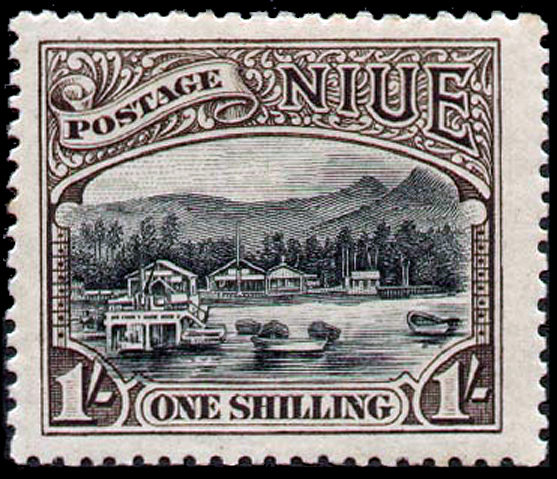
A 1920 stamp of Niue

This is a survey of the postage stamps and postal history of Niue.

Niue is an island country in the South Pacific Ocean. It is commonly known as the "Rock of Polynesia", and inhabitants of the island call it "the Rock" for short. Niue is 2,400 kilometres (1,500 mi) northeast of New Zealand in a triangle between Tonga to the southwest, the Samoas to the northwest, and the Cook Islands to the southeast. The land area is 260 square kilometres (100 mi^{2}) with about 1,400 people who are predominantly Polynesian.

== First stamps ==
The first stamps of Niue, issued on 4 January 1902, were overprints of then-current New Zealand stamps. The first stamps inscribed "Niue" were the 1920 pictorial series.

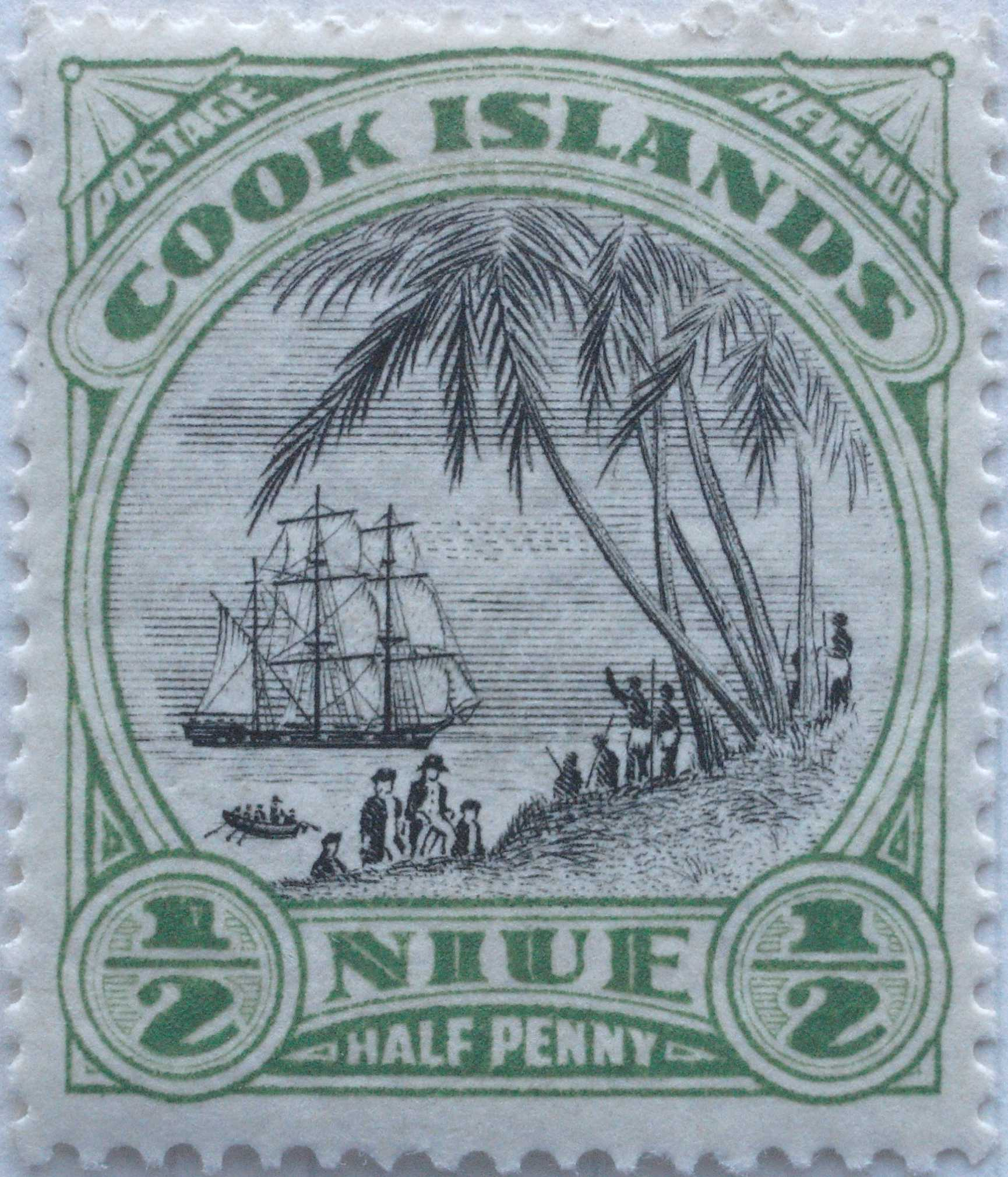
A 1932 stamp of Niue inscribed "Cook Islands Niue"

== Later issues ==
Niue stamps are now issued on a regular basis.

The Niue Philatelic and Numismatic Company, established by the Niue Philatelic and Numismatic Act 1996, was established "to administer philatelic, numismatic and other revenue earning options and services." Stamps are currently issued on behalf of this company by New Zealand Post, and are sold at face value through the New Zealand Post web site.

== 2011 Royal Wedding ==
In 2011, Niue was forced to defend a pair of stamps issued for the Wedding of Prince William and Catherine Middleton that split the royal couple when the stamps were separated for use.

== See also ==
- Postage stamps and postal history of Aitutaki
- Postage stamps and postal history of the Cook Islands
- Postage stamps and postal history of Penrhyn
