= Postage stamps and postal history of the Cook Islands =

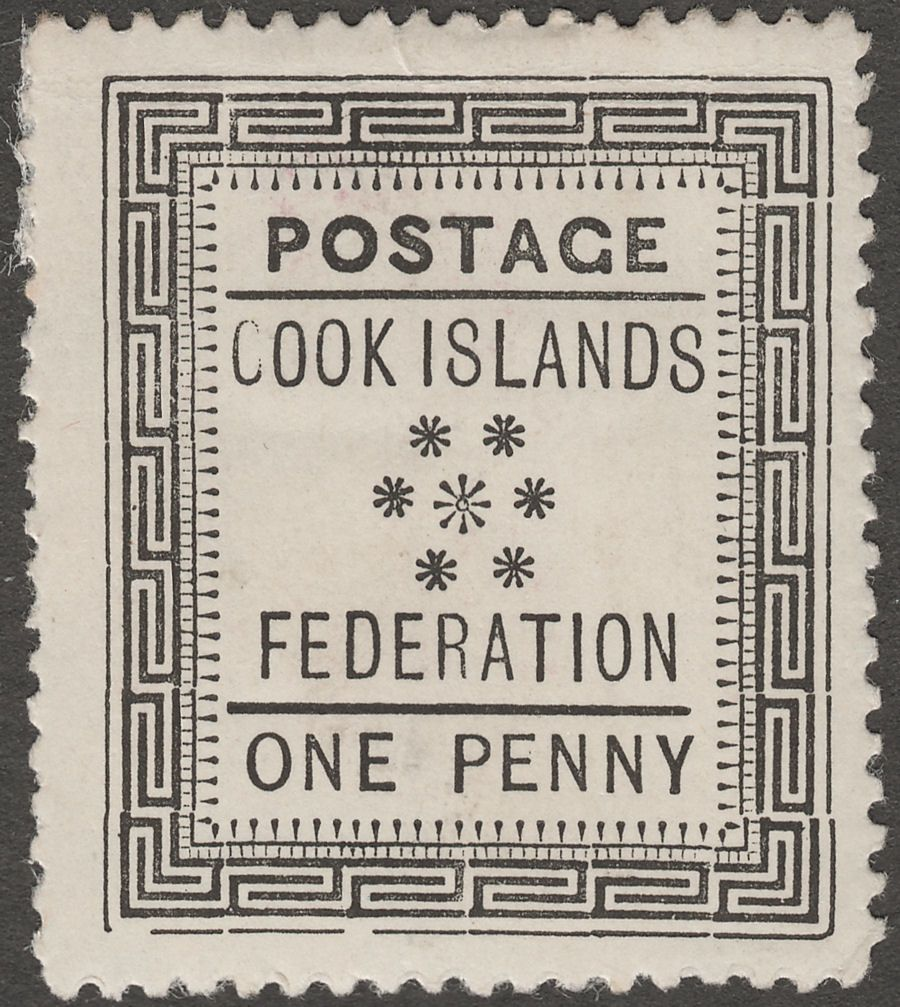
An 1892 stamp of the islands

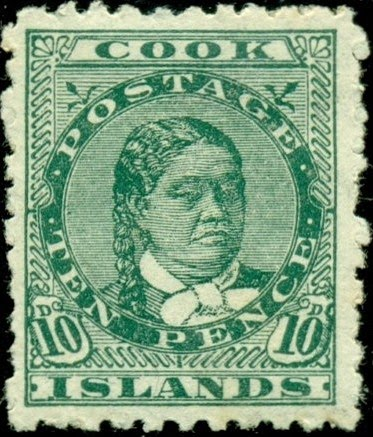
An 1893 stamp of the Cook Islands showing Queen Makea

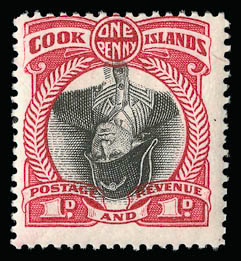
A 1933 stamp of the Cook Islands with the head of Cook inverted in error

This is a survey of the postage stamps and postal history of the Cook Islands.

The Cook Islands are named after Captain James Cook, who visited the islands in 1773 and 1777. They became a British protectorate in 1888 and in 1900 administrative control was transferred to New Zealand. In 1965 residents chose self-government in free association with New Zealand. The Cook Islands contain 15 islands in the group spread over the South Pacific.

== First stamps ==
The first stamps of the Cook Islands were issued on 7 May 1892.

== Rarotonga issues ==
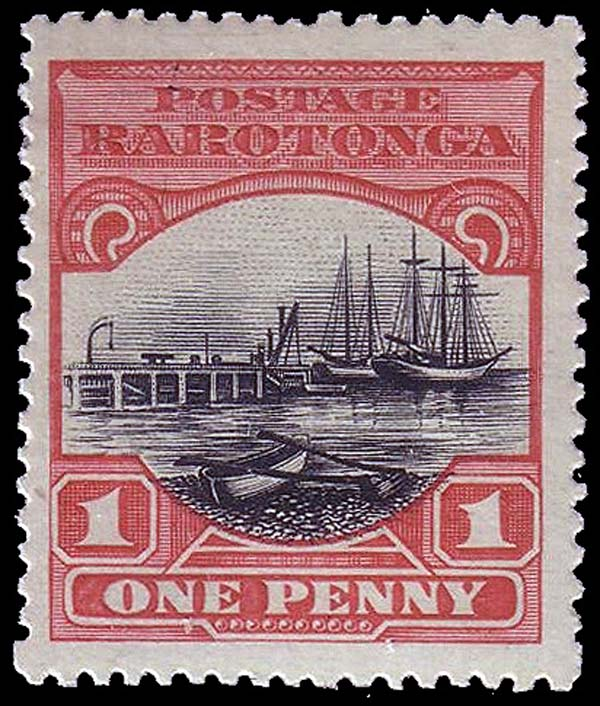
A 1920 stamp inscribed "Rarotonga"

The stamps of the Cook Islands were inscribed "Rarotonga" from 1919 to 1932.

Since 2011, separate stamps for Rarotonga have also been issued by the Cook Islands.

== See also ==
- Postage stamps and postal history of Aitutaki
- Postage stamps and postal history of Niue
- Postage stamps and postal history of Penrhyn
