= Colonial Exposition Issue =

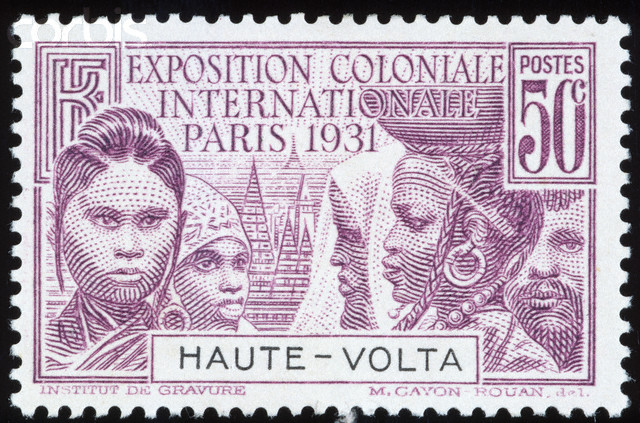
Exposition Coloniale Internationale issue, Upper Volta 1931

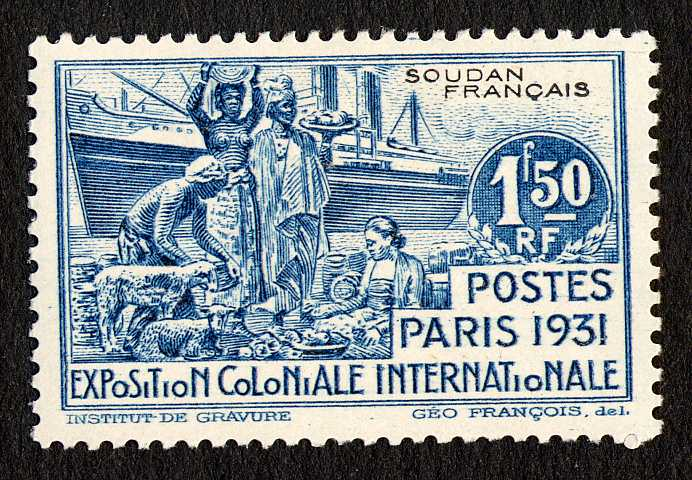
Exposition Coloniale Internationale issue, French Sudan 1931

The Colonial Exposition Issue was the first omnibus issue of the French colonial empire. Issued in 1931, in conjunction with the Paris Colonial Exposition, it consisted of four different engraved designs, denominated in the local currency. 26 French territories participated.

The four designs had themes reflecting those of the exposition:

- People of the French empire (green)
- Women's heads (violet)
- An allegory of France showing the way to civilization (red orange)
- Colonial commerce, with natives holding their wares, and a steamship in the background (blue)

Stamp inscriptions read "Exposition Coloniale Internationale Paris 1931". The designs were identical for all territories, differing only in currency, and the name of the territory, which was printed in black. France also issued stamps for the Colonial Exposition, but with different designs.

== Participating colonies ==
- French Cameroon
- French Chad
- French Dahomey
- French Guiana
- French Guinea
- French India
- French Polynesia
- French Sudan
- Gabon
- Guadeloupe
- French Indochina
- Ivory Coast
- French Madagascar
- Martinique
- Mauritania
- Middle Congo
- New Caledonia
- Niger
- Oubangui-Chari
- Réunion
- Saint Pierre and Miquelon
- Senegal
- French Somali Coast
- French Togo
- Upper Volta
- Wallis and Futuna Islands
