= Omnibus issue =

In philately, an omnibus issue is an issue of stamps by several countries with a common subject and which may share a uniform design. Omnibus issues have often been made by countries under common political control or groups of colonies due to the close co-operation required to produce the issue. Omnibus issues are to be distinguished from joint issues which are usually much narrower in scope.

== The first omnibus issue ==
The first omnibus has been said to be the issue of 1898 by the Portuguese colonial empire to commemorate the quatercentenary of Vasco de Gama's discovery of the sea route to India.

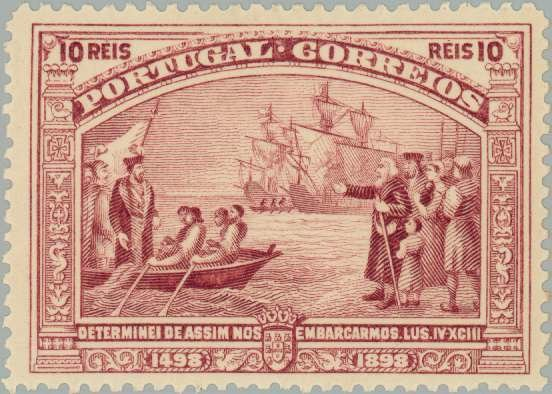
Portugal

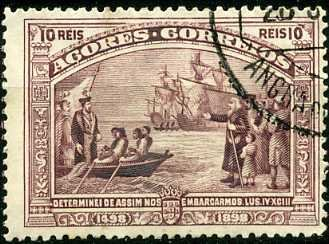
Azores

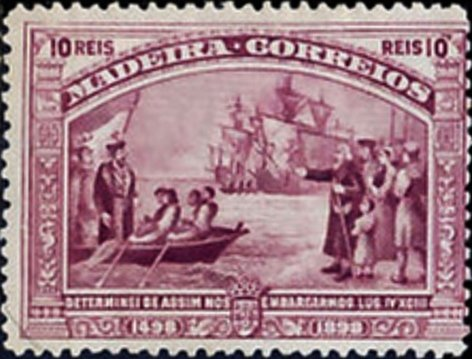
Madeira

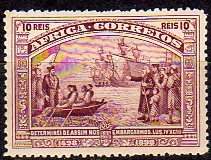
Portuguese Africa

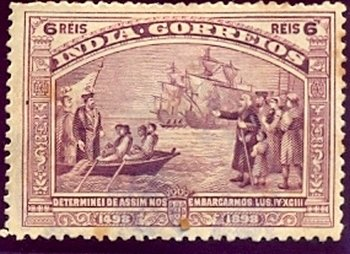
Portuguese India

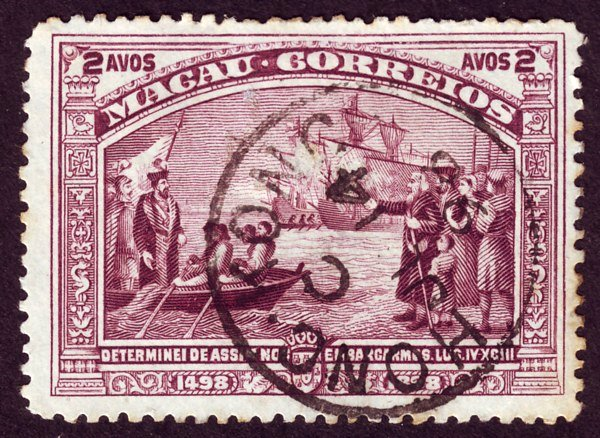
Portuguese Macau

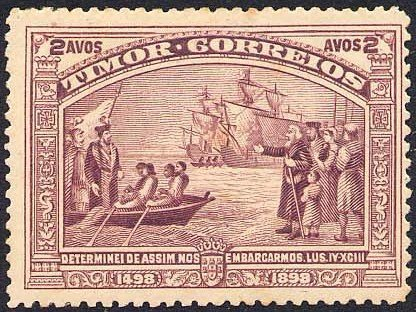
Portuguese Timor

== British Empire and British Overseas Territories issues ==
Omnibuses have been particularly associated with stamps from the former British Empire, now the British Commonwealth, due to the large number of territories participating. Initially designs were identical for each colony with only the values, colours and colony names varying. Over time, however, a wider range of designs has been used within the same issue. The first issue was the Silver Jubilee issue of 1935. Many others have followed, usually on themes related to the British Royal Family, but also for subjects such as Freedom from Hunger (1963) and the 1966 Football World Cup. Not every colony necessarily participates in every issue, although the revenue produced by the stamps is a valuable source of income for many smaller colonies/countries which may have few other ways of raising funds.

A list of British Omnibus issues is given below:

1935 - Silver Jubilee

1937 - Coronation

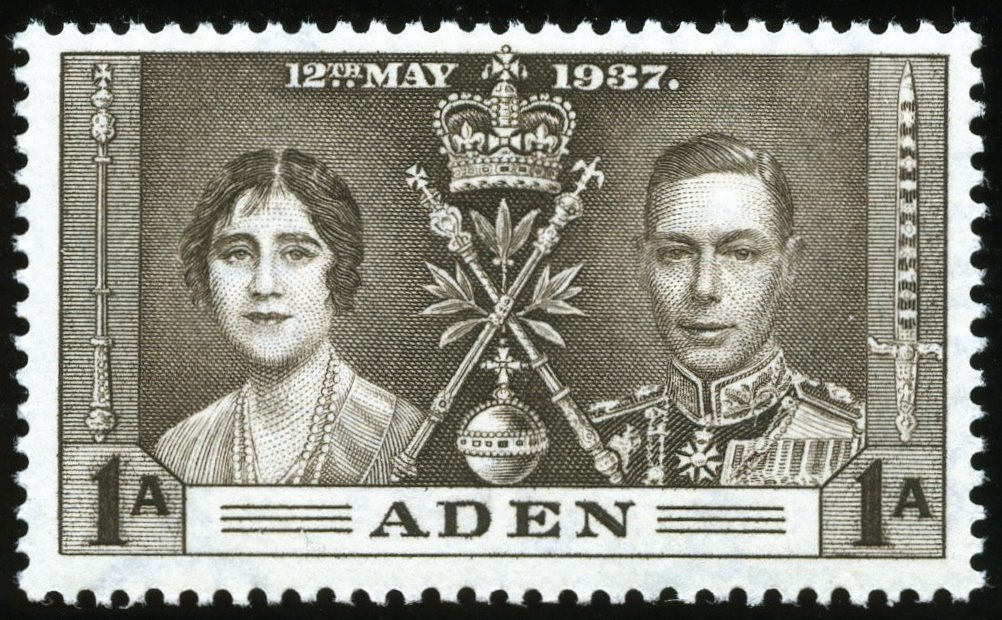
Aden

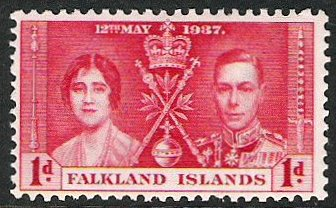
Falkland Islands

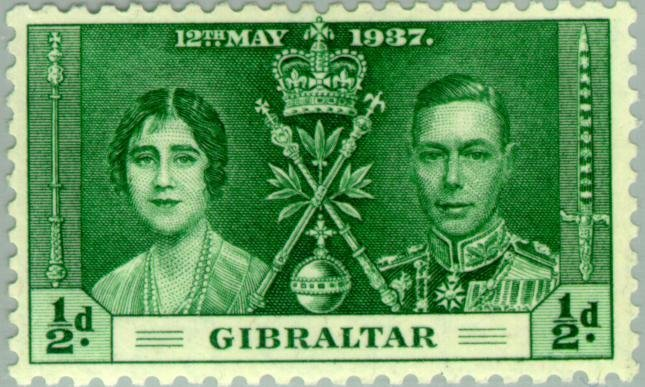
Gibraltar

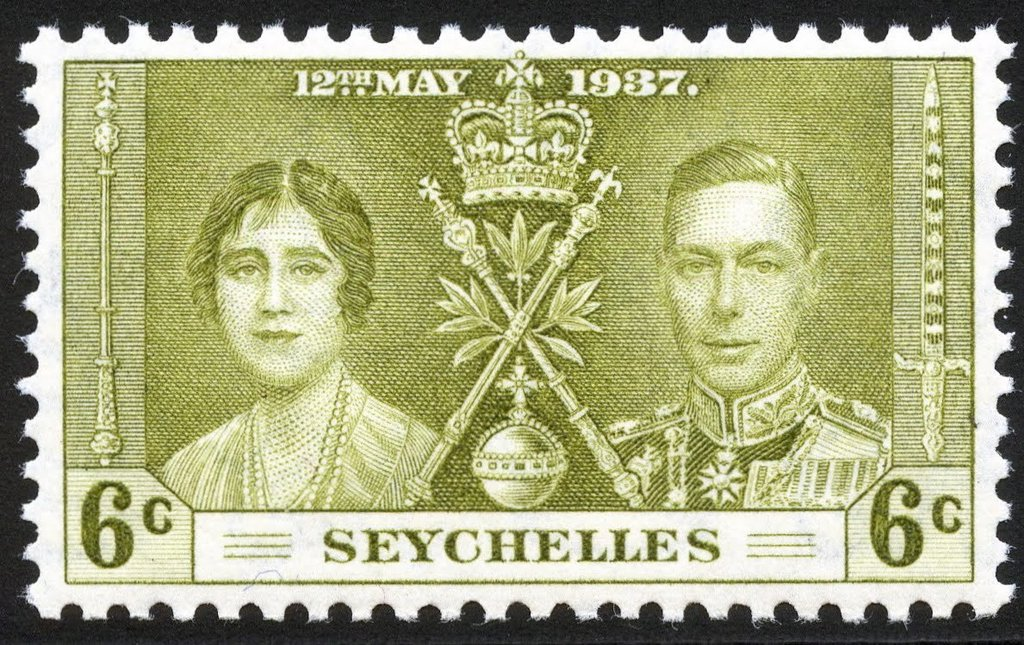
Seychelles

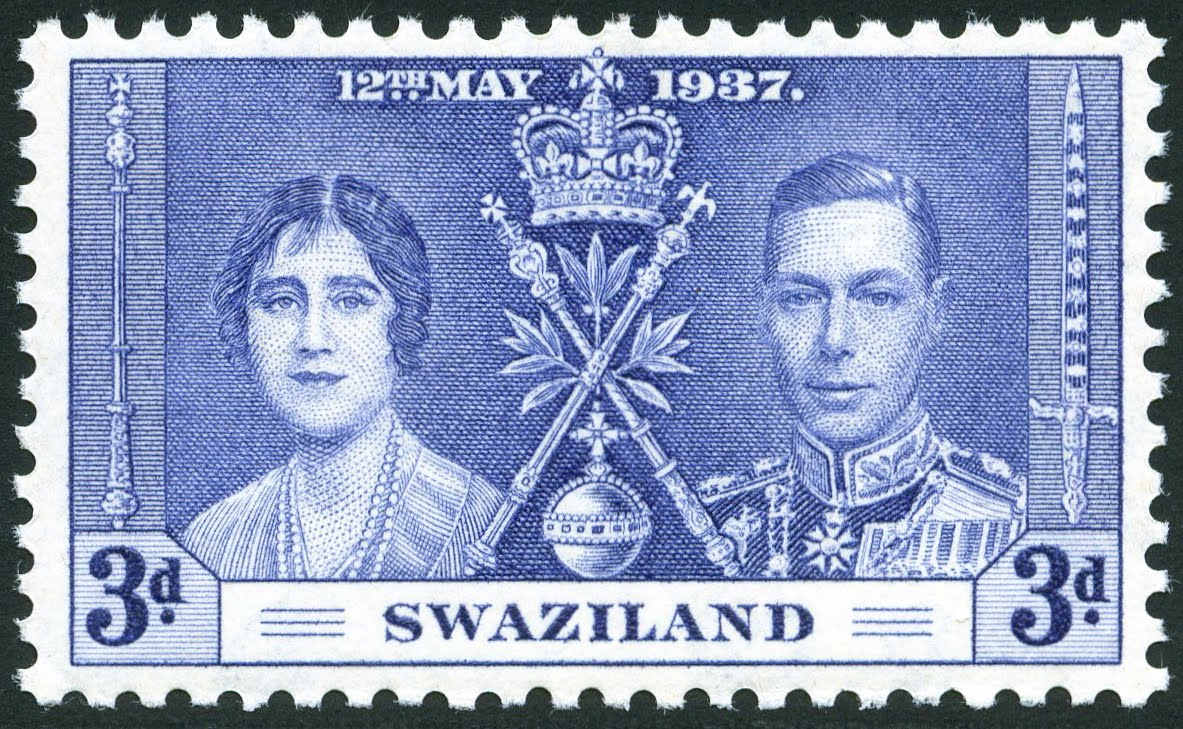
Swaziland

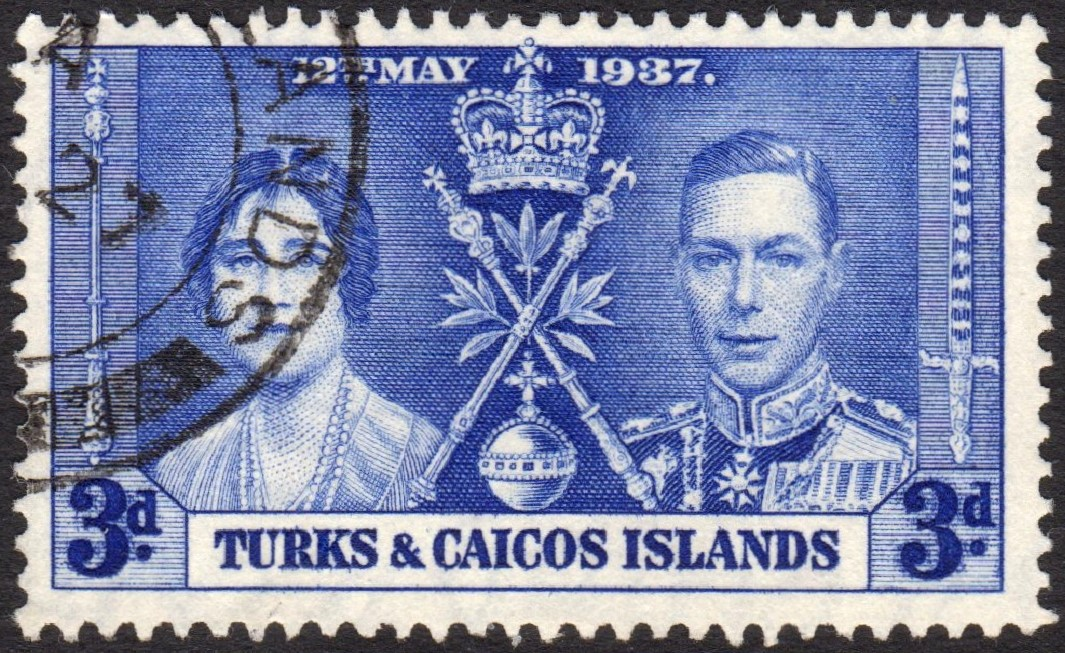
Turks and Caicos Islands

1945-1946 - Peace and Victory

1948-1949 - Silver Wedding

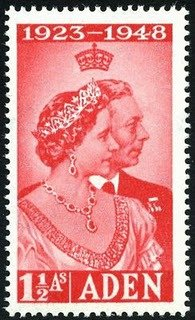
Aden

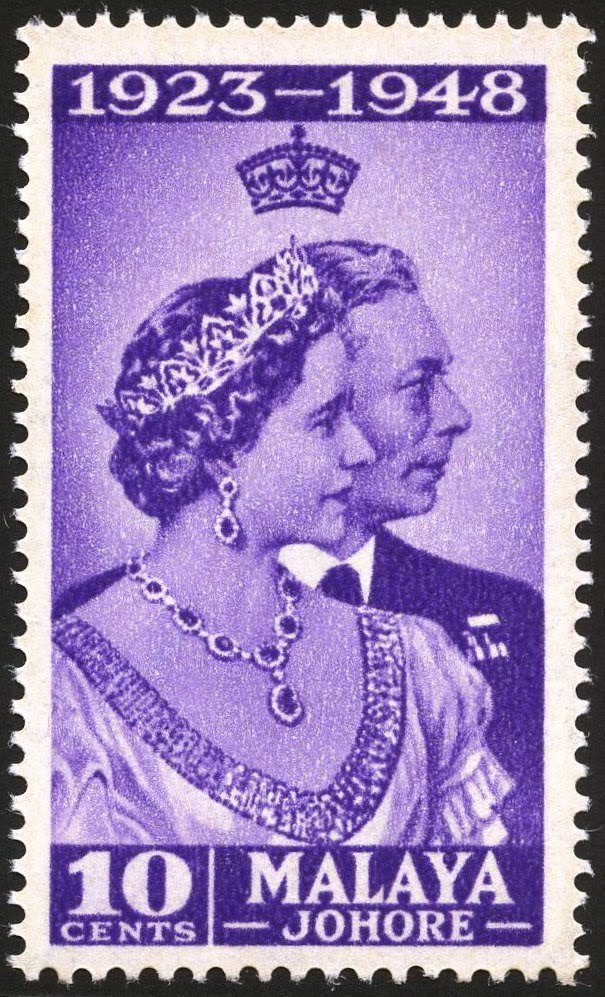
Johore

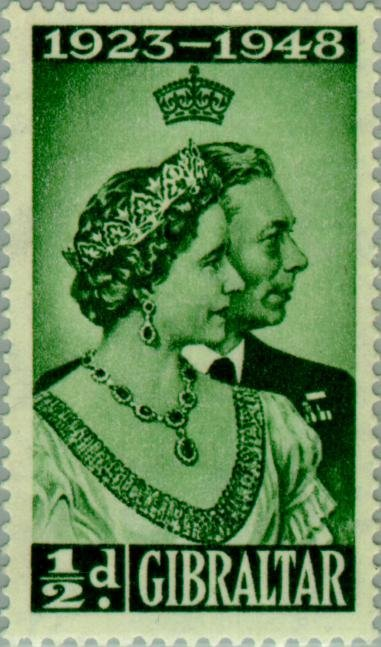
Gibraltar

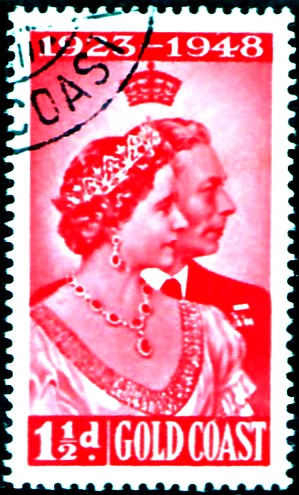
Gold Coast

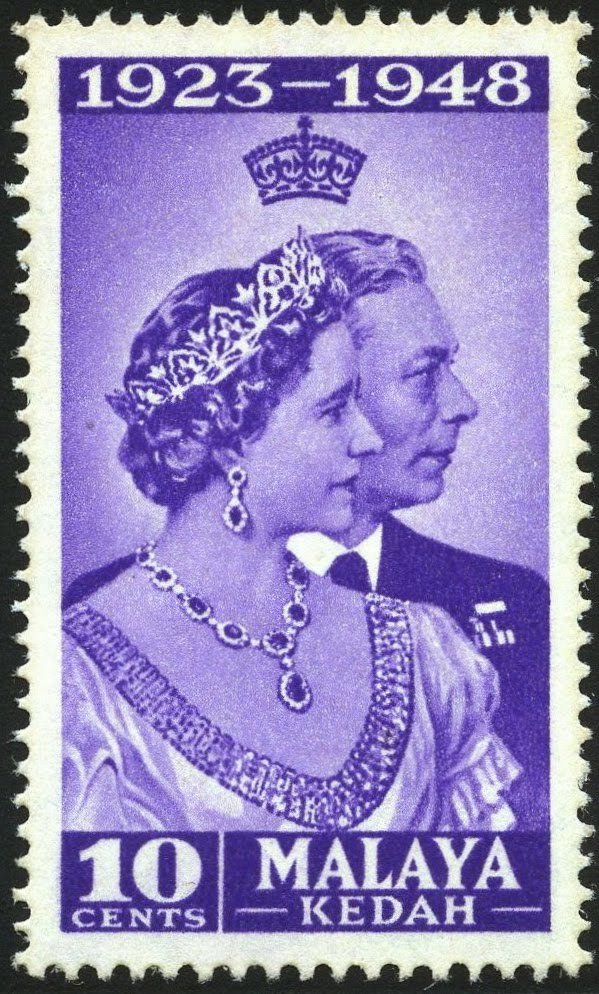
Kedah

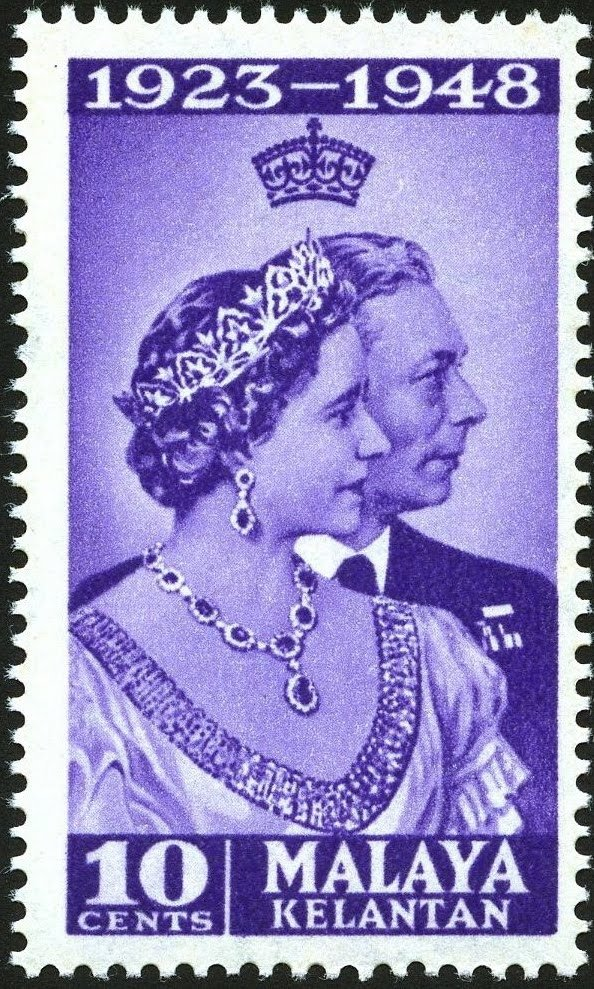
Kelantan

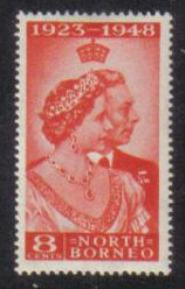
North Borneo

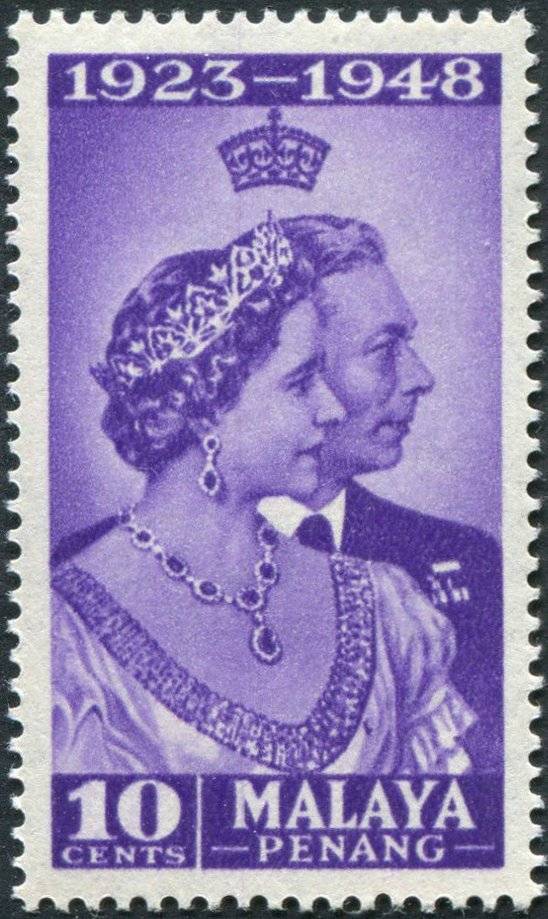
Penang

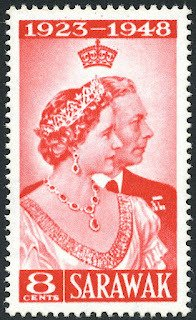
Sarawak

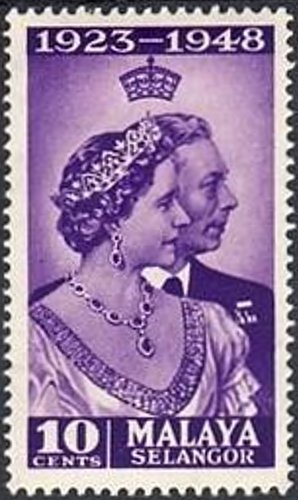
Selangor

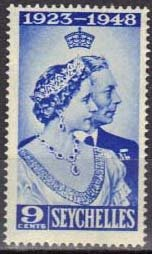
Seychelles

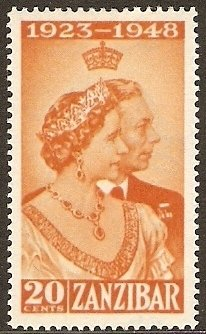
Zanzibar

1949 - Universal Postal Union

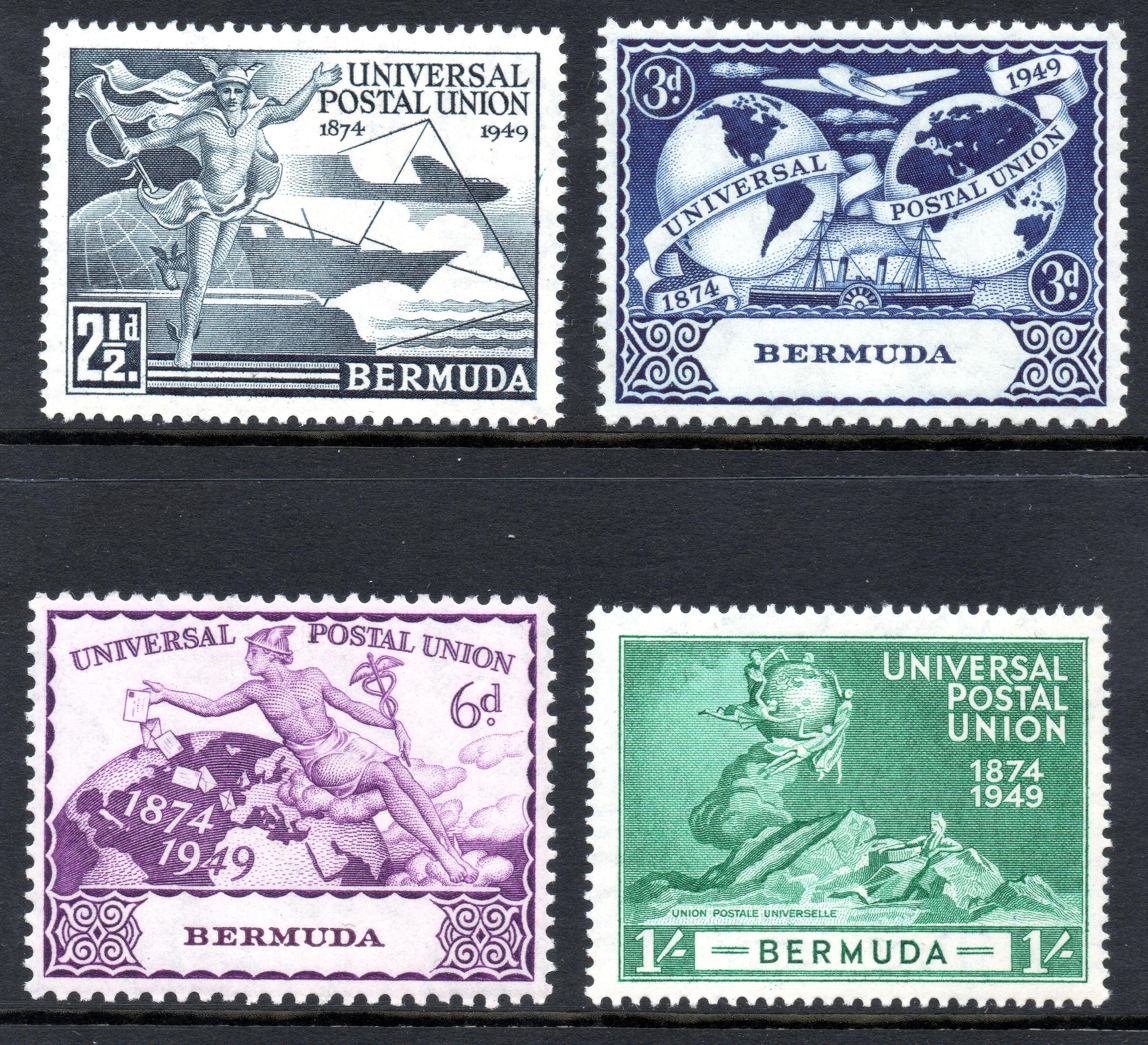
Bermuda

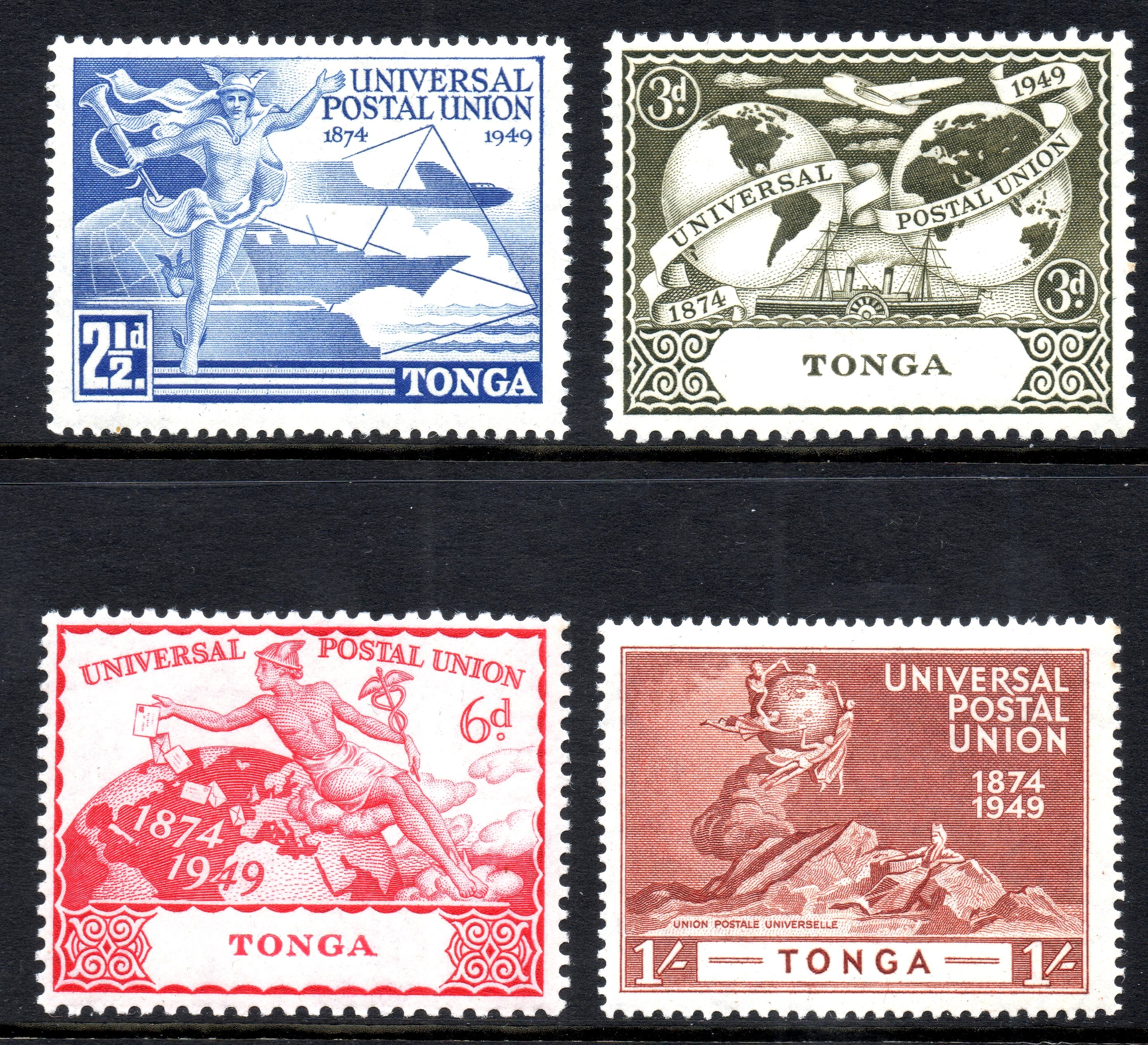
Tonga

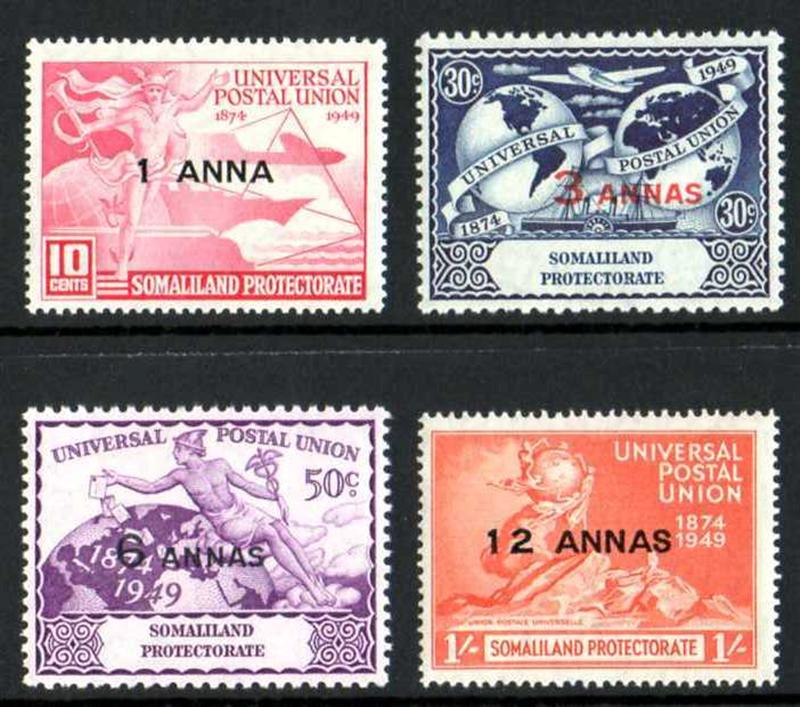
British Somaliland

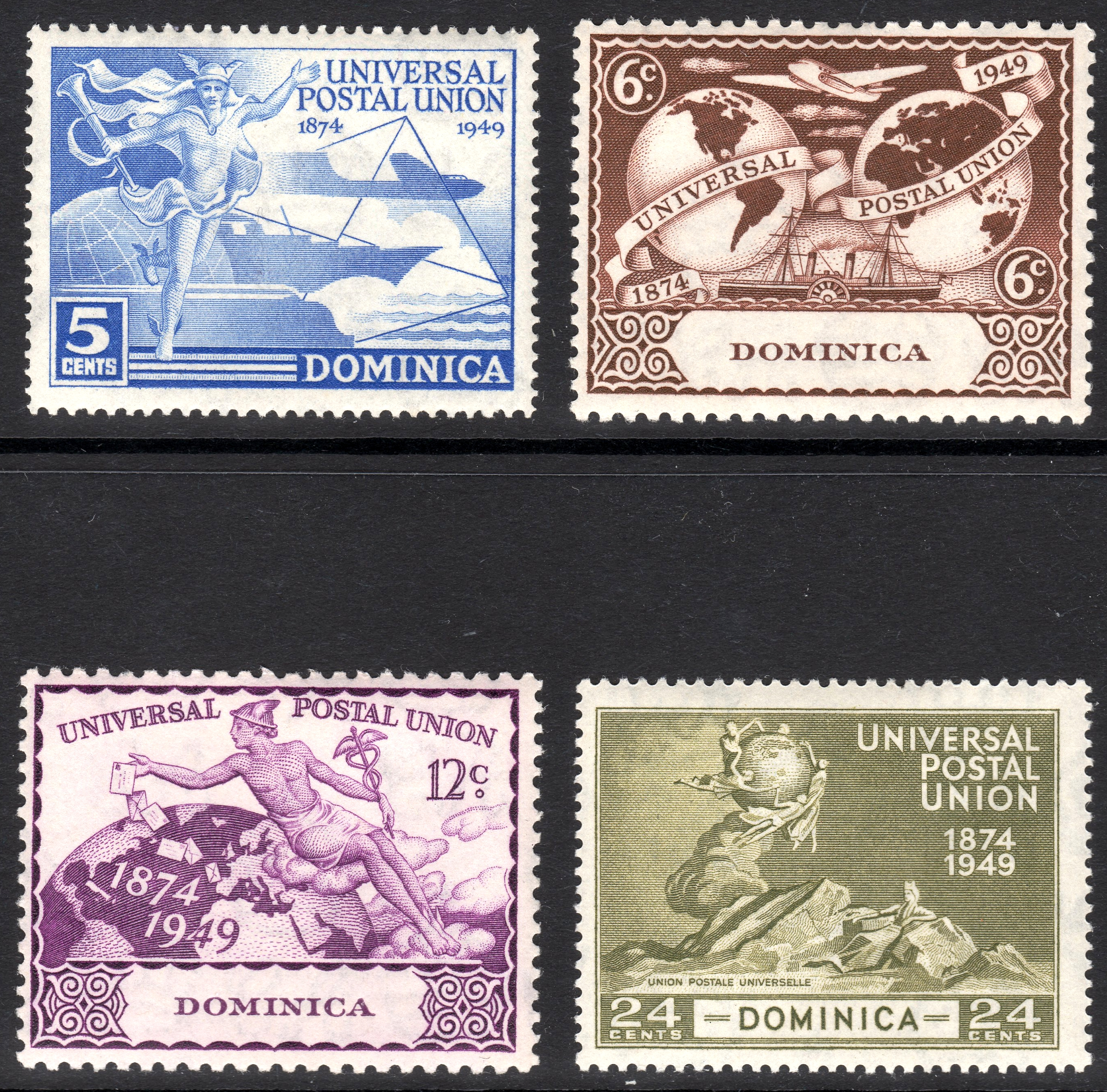
Dominica

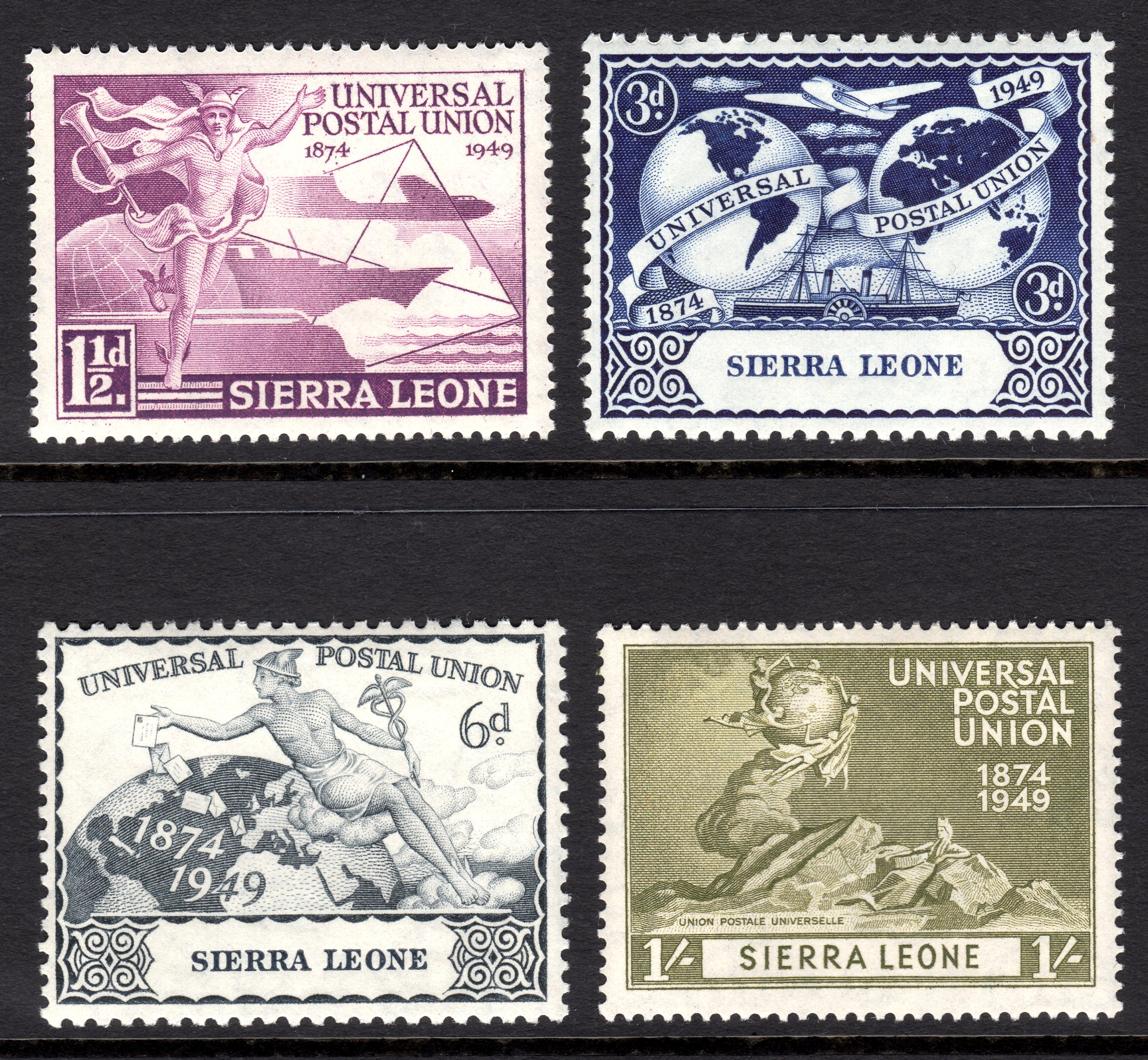
Sierra Leone

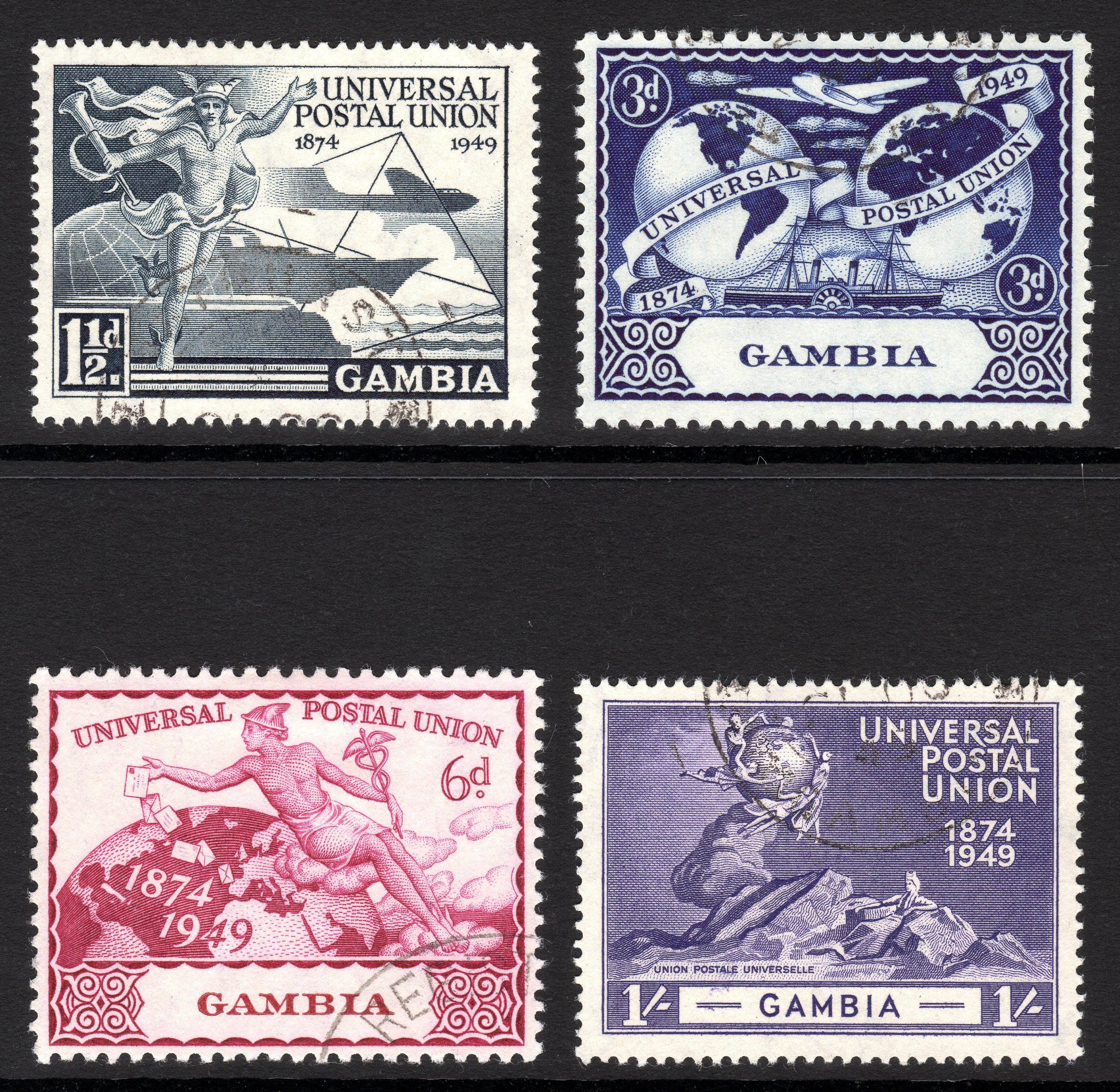
Gambia

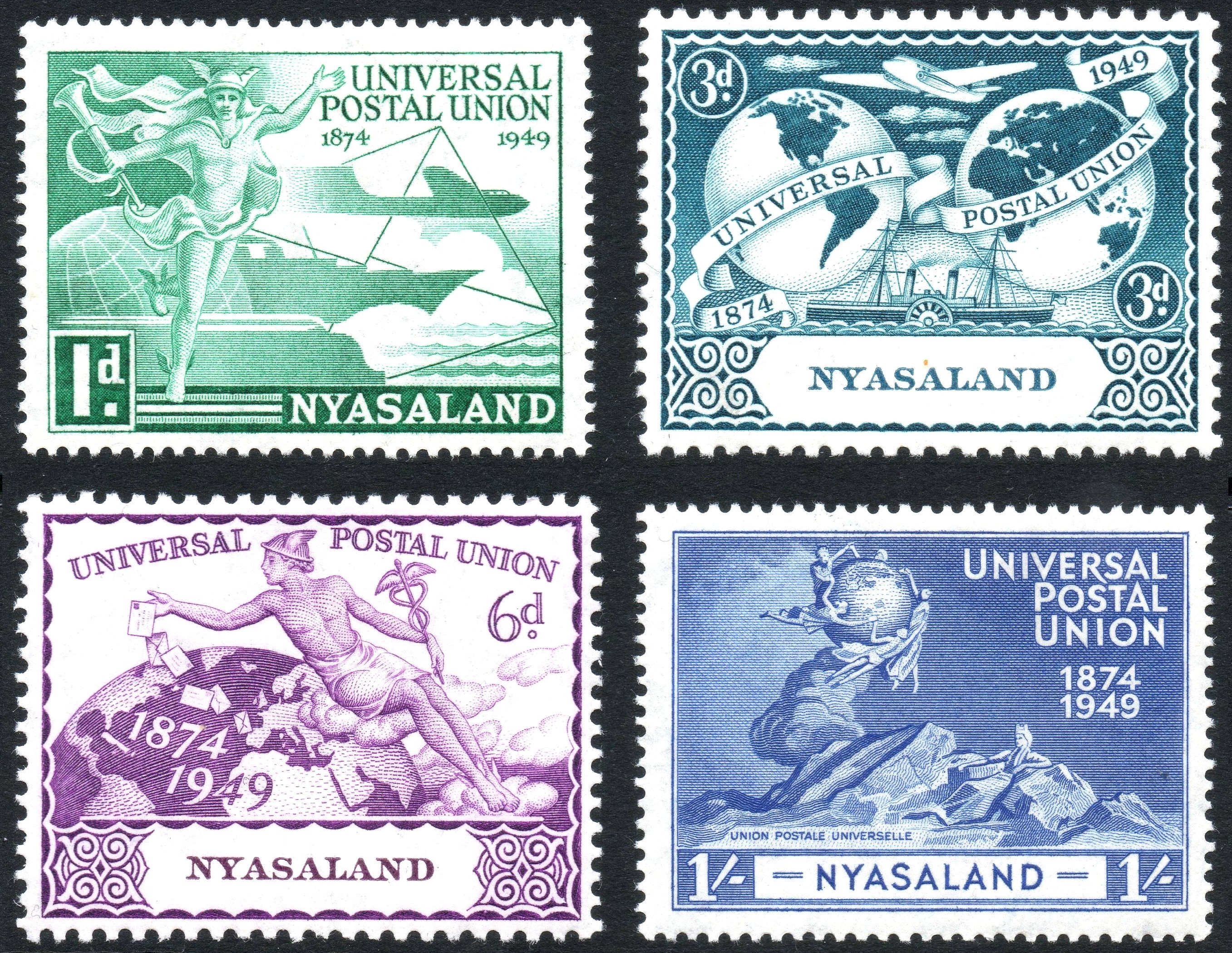
Nyasaland

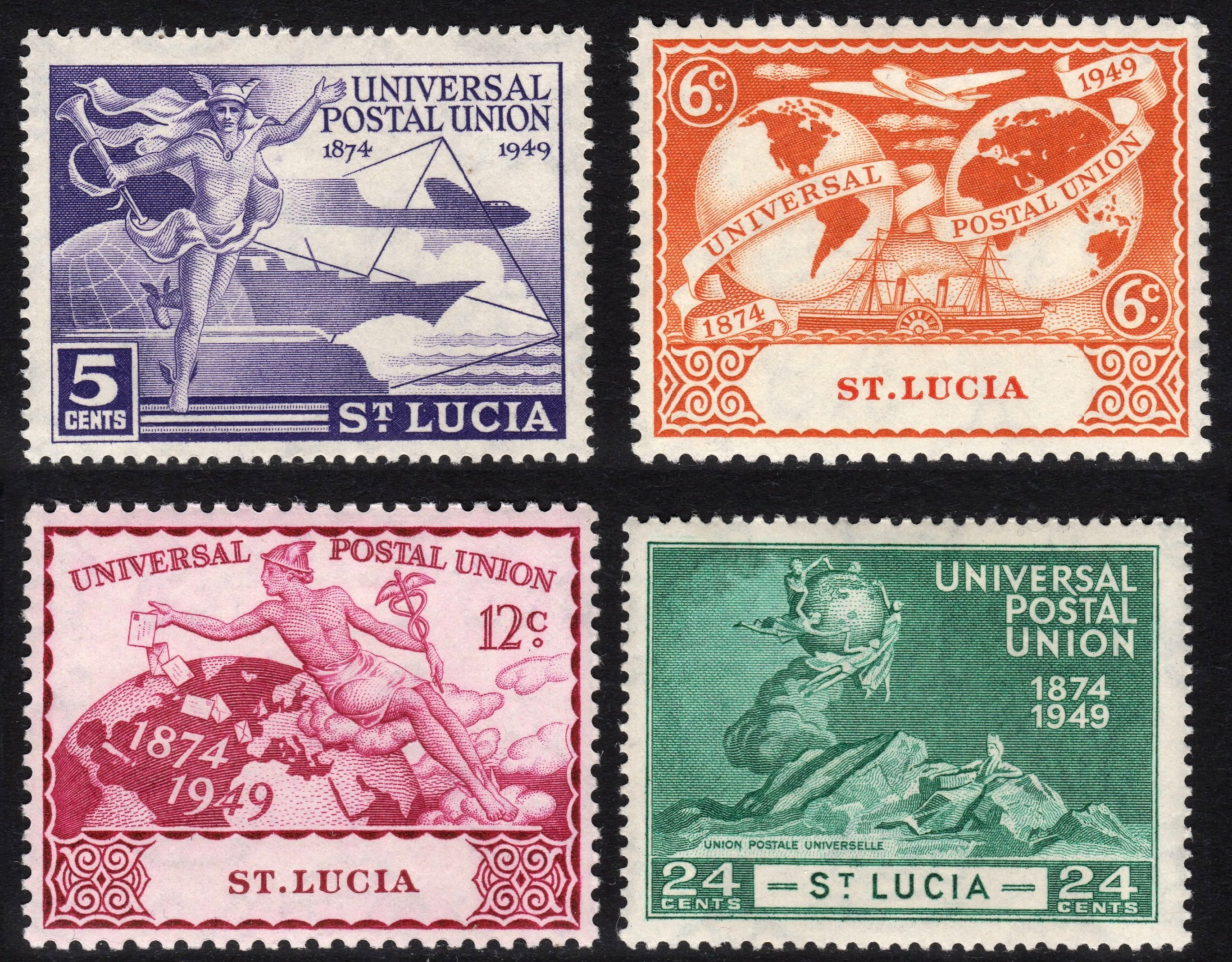
St. Lucia

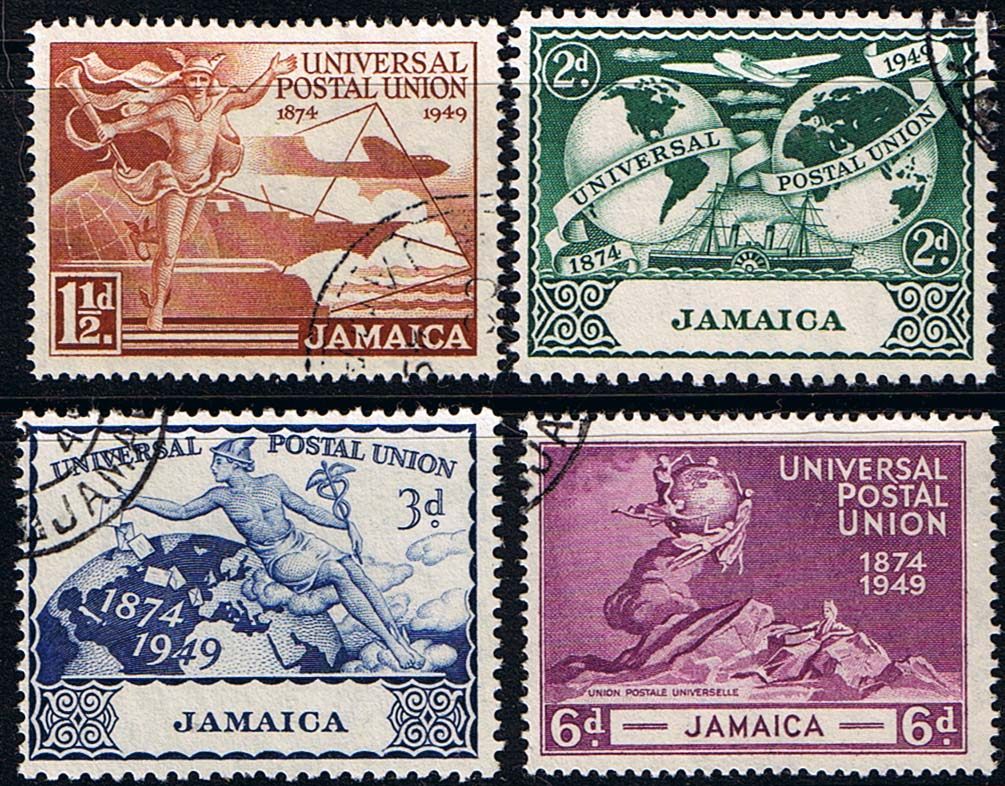
Jamaica

1951 - University

1953 - QEII Coronation

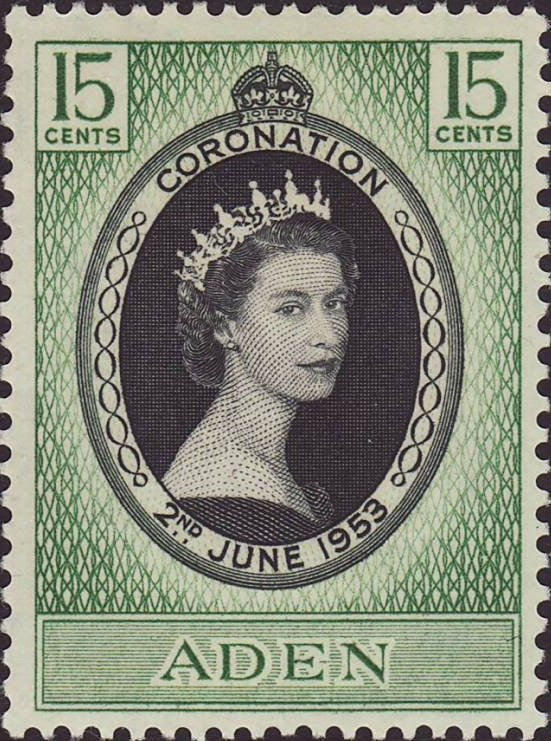
Aden

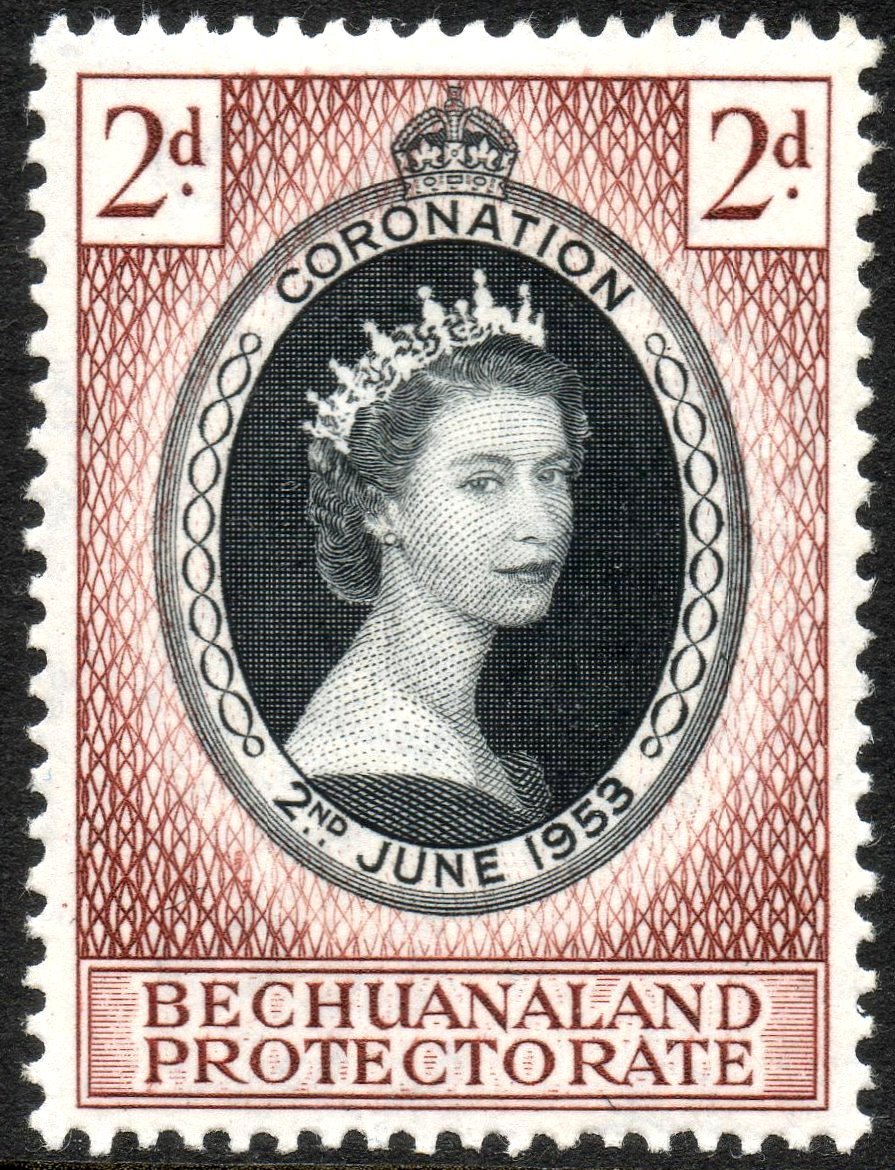
Bechuanaland Protectorate

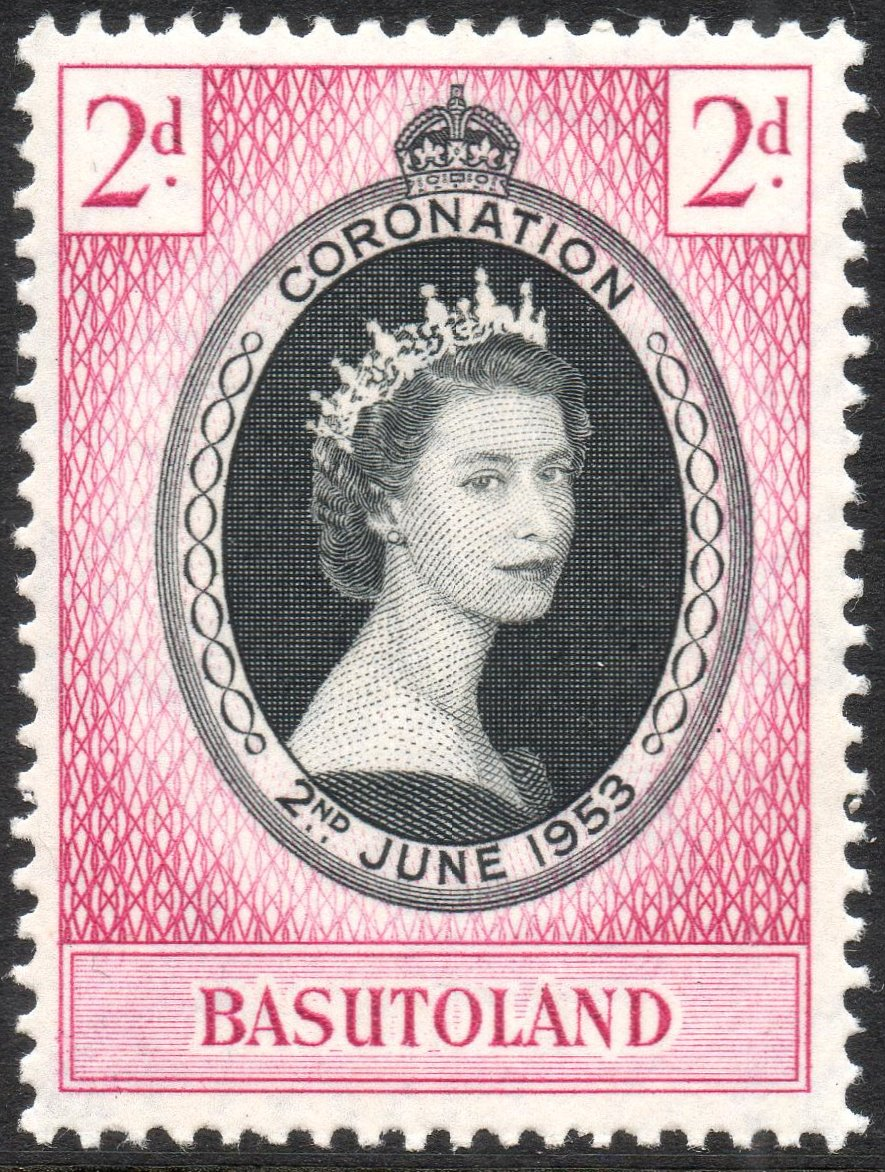
Basutoland

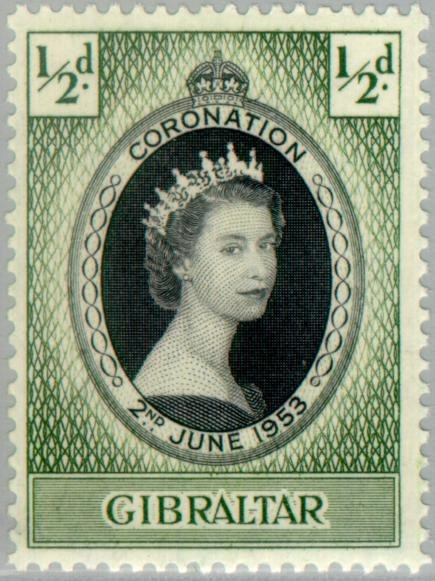
Gibraltar

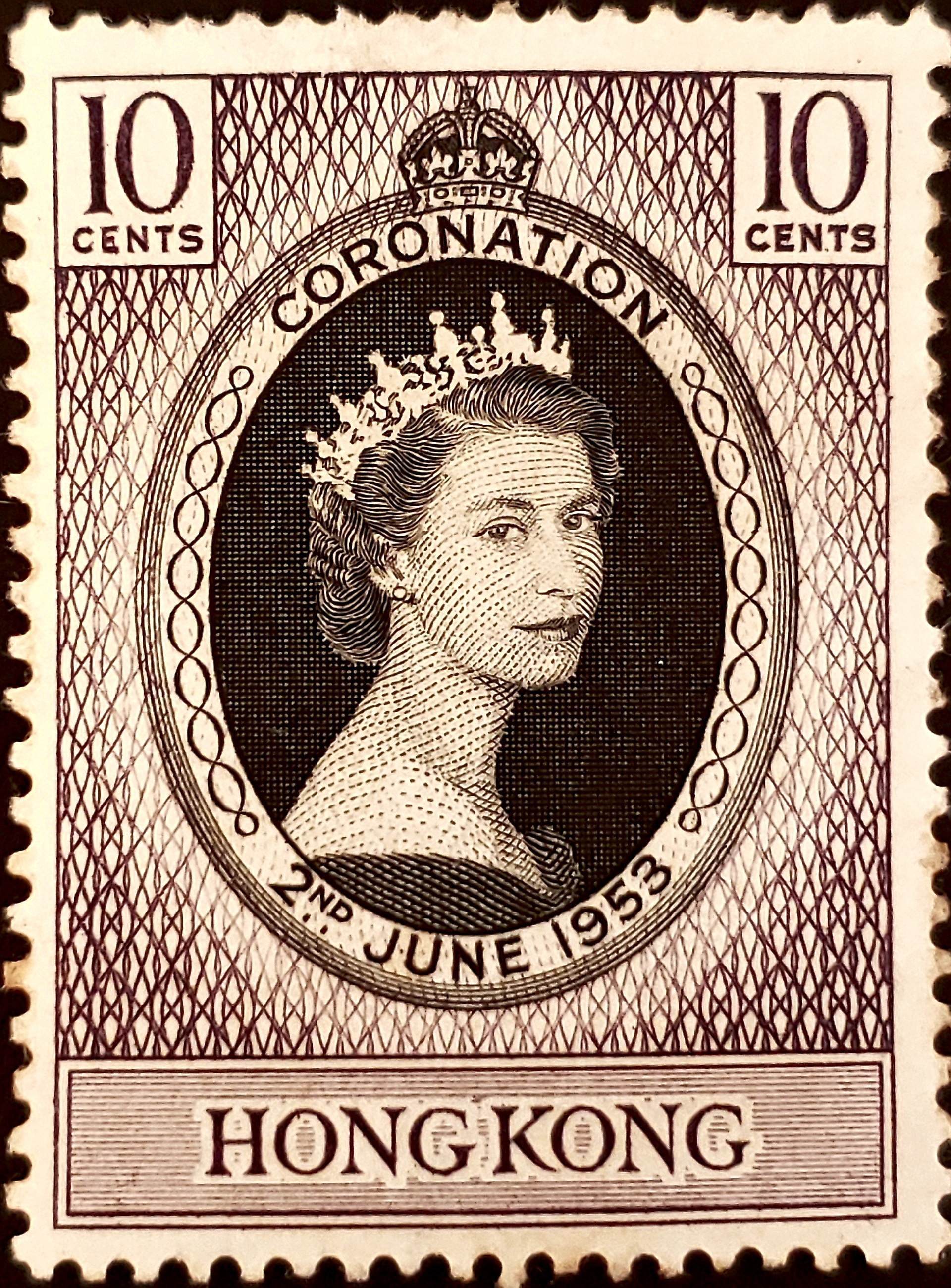
Hong Kong

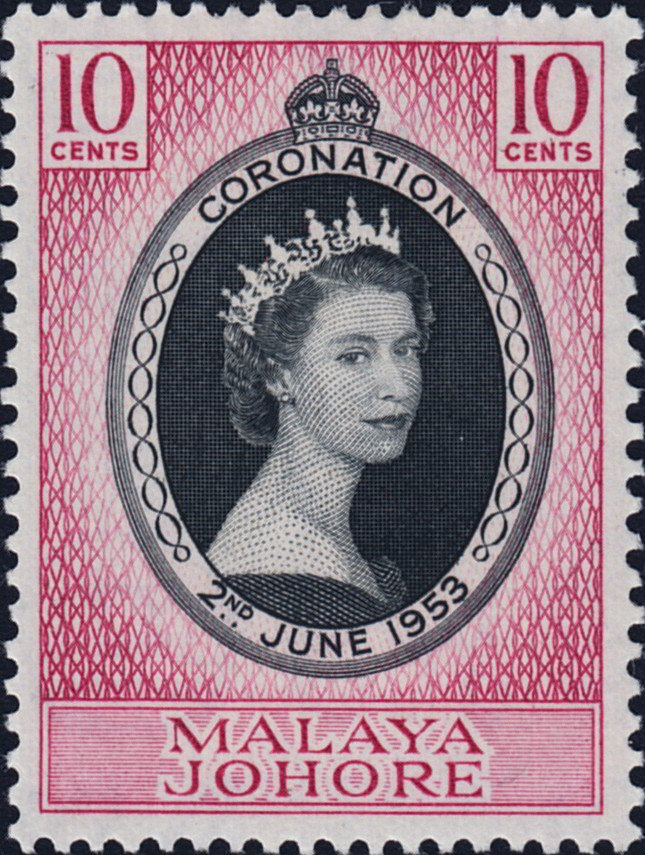
Johore

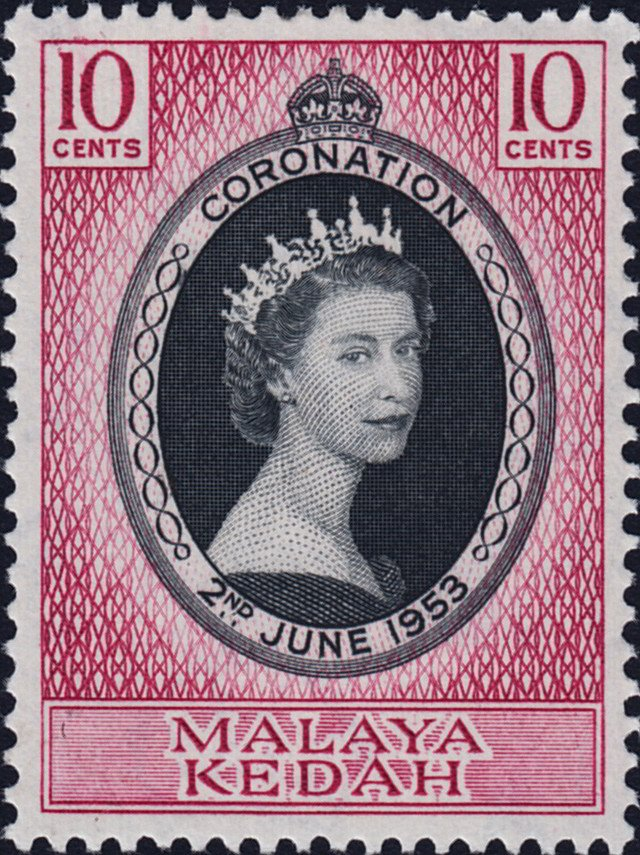
Kedah

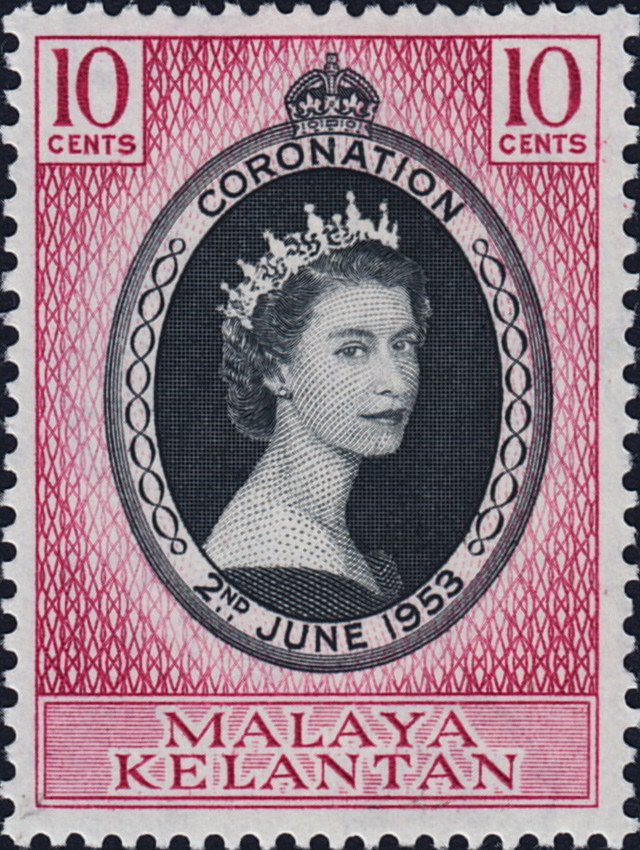
Kelantan

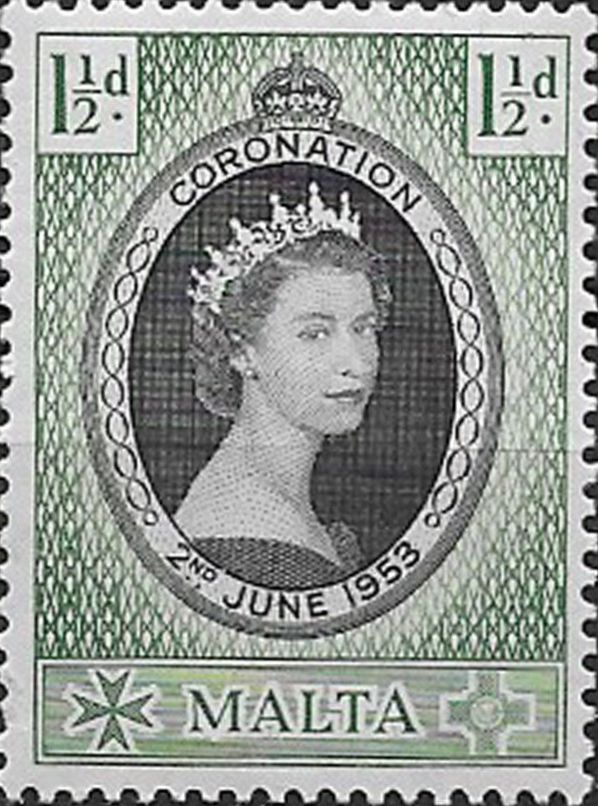
Malta

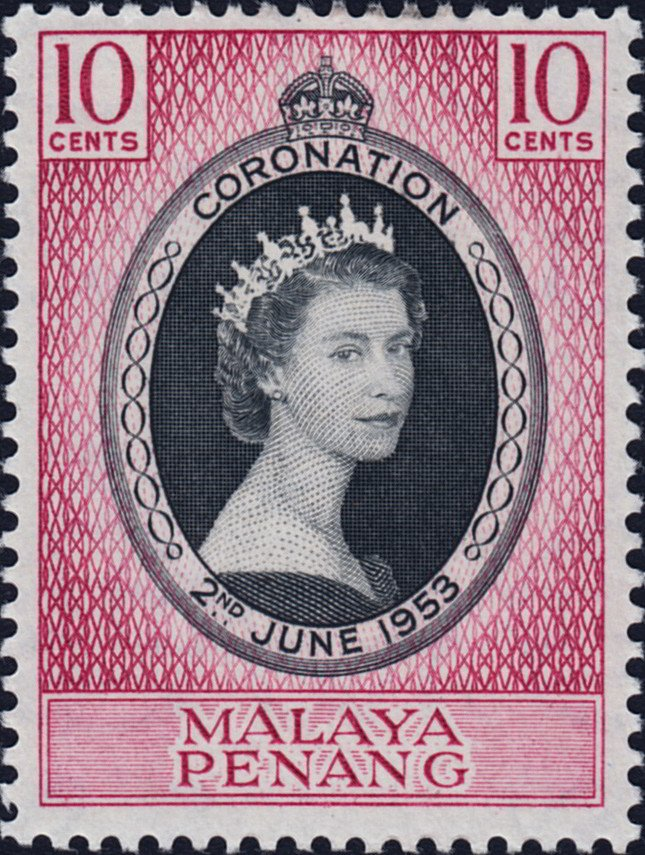
Penang

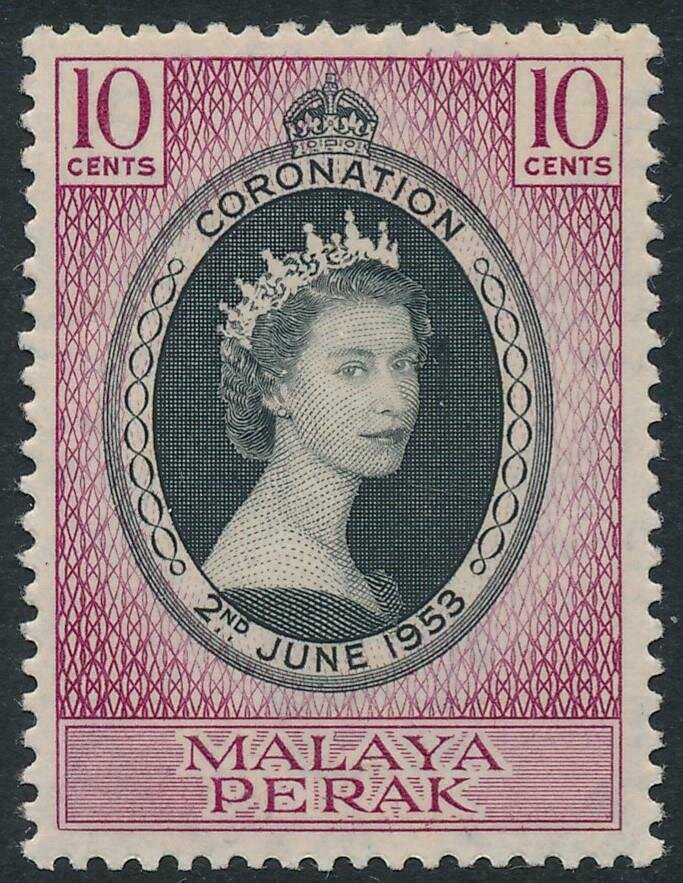
Perak

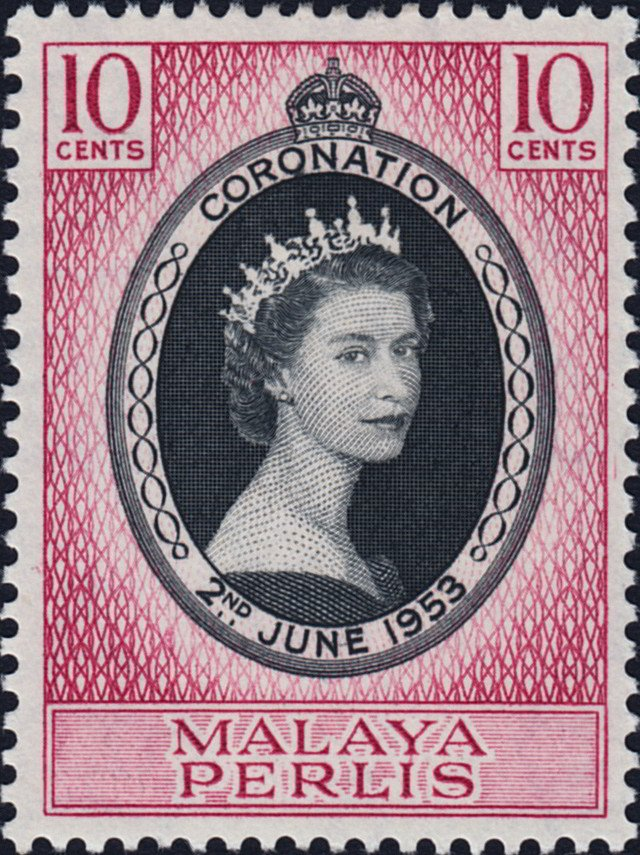
Perlis

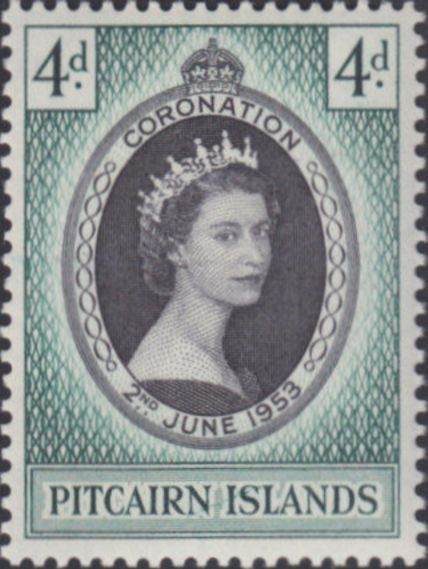
Pitcairn Islands

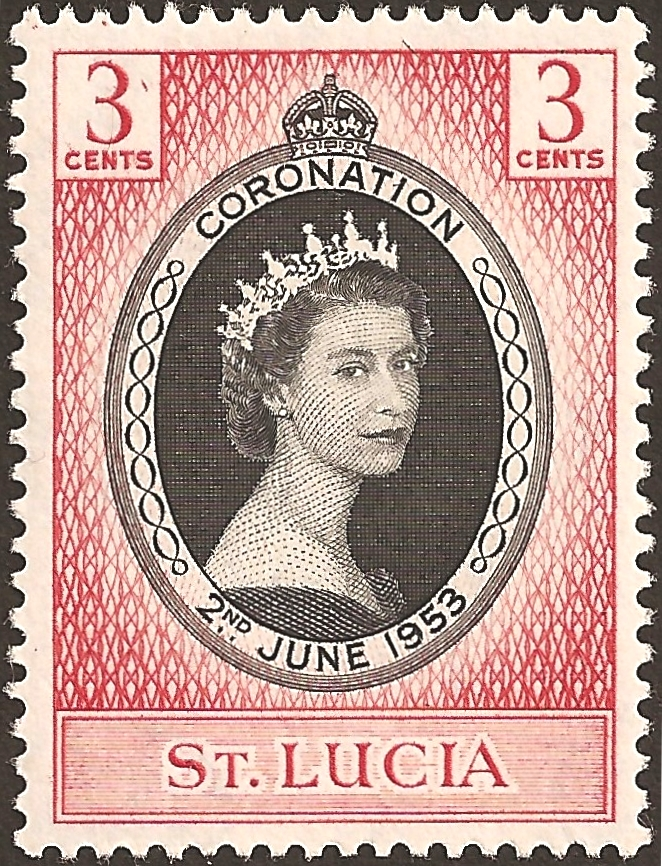
St. Lucia

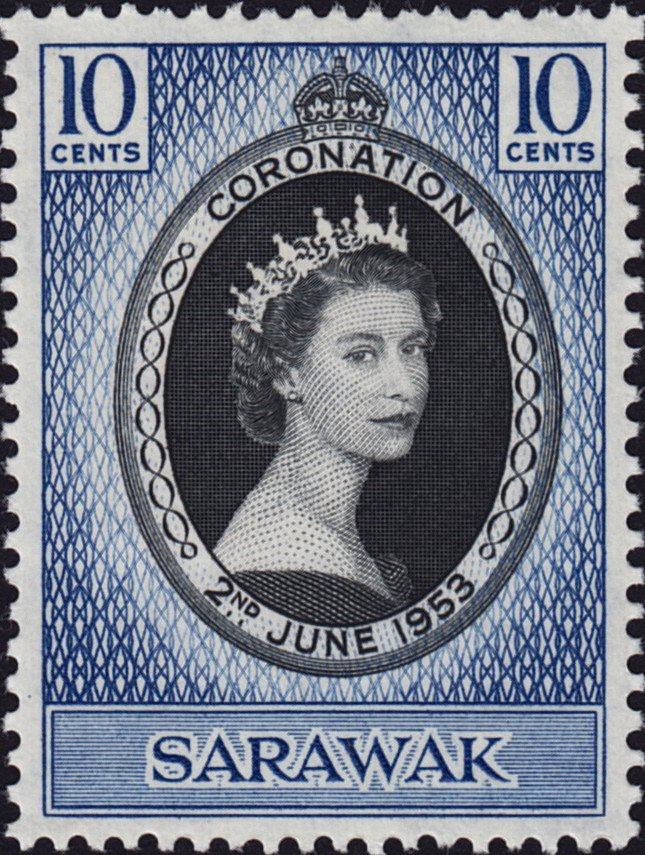
Sarawak

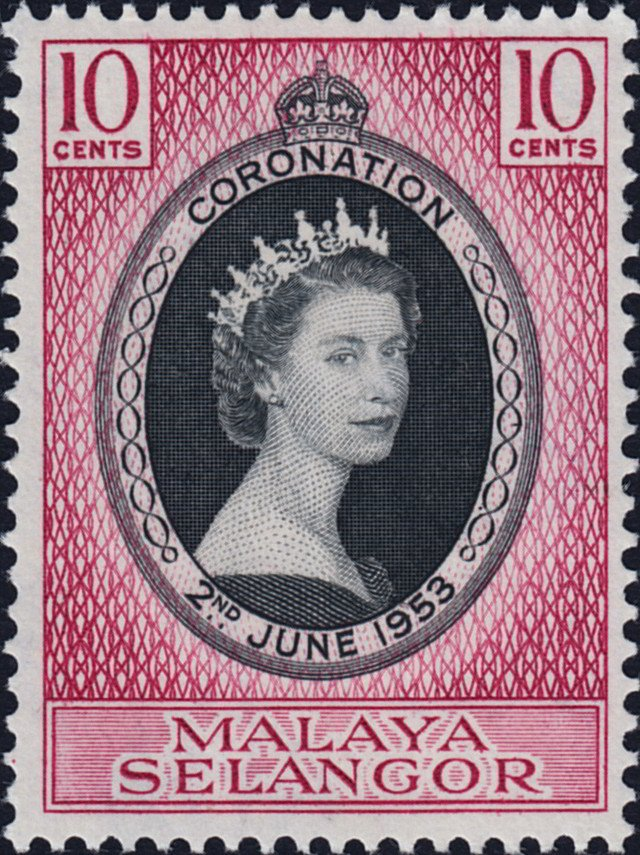
Selangor

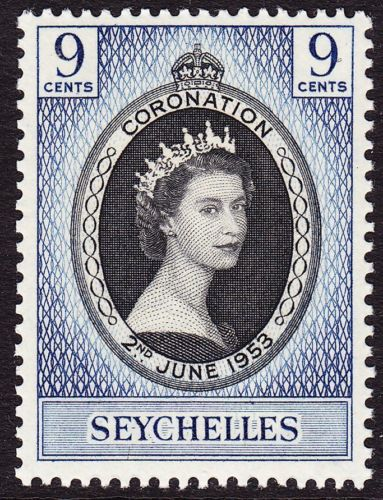
Seychelles

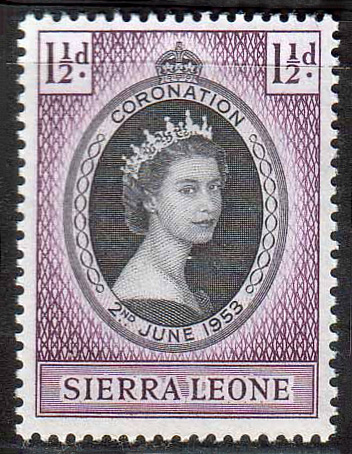
Sierra Leone

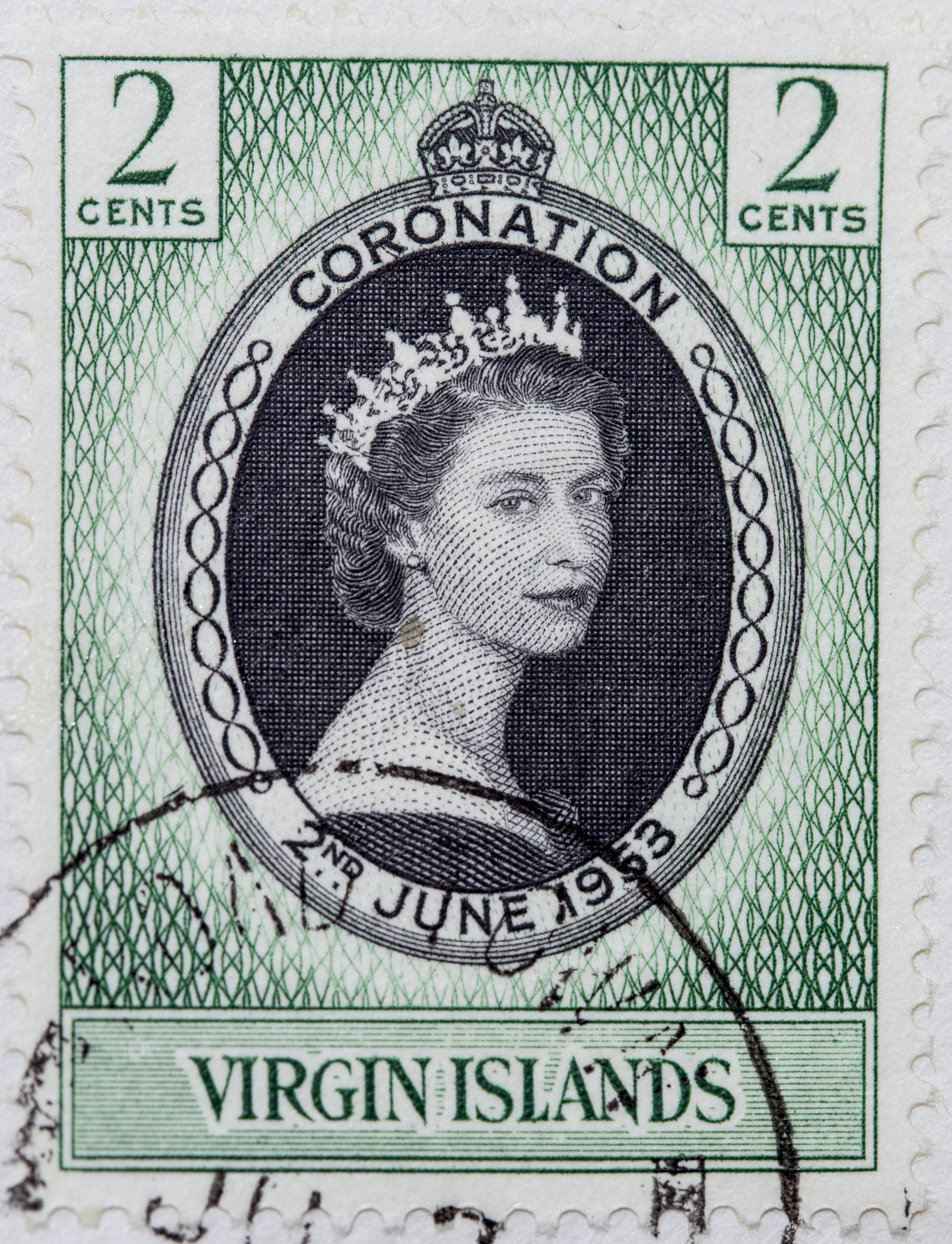
Virgin Islands

1953 - Royal Visit

1958 - West Indies Federation

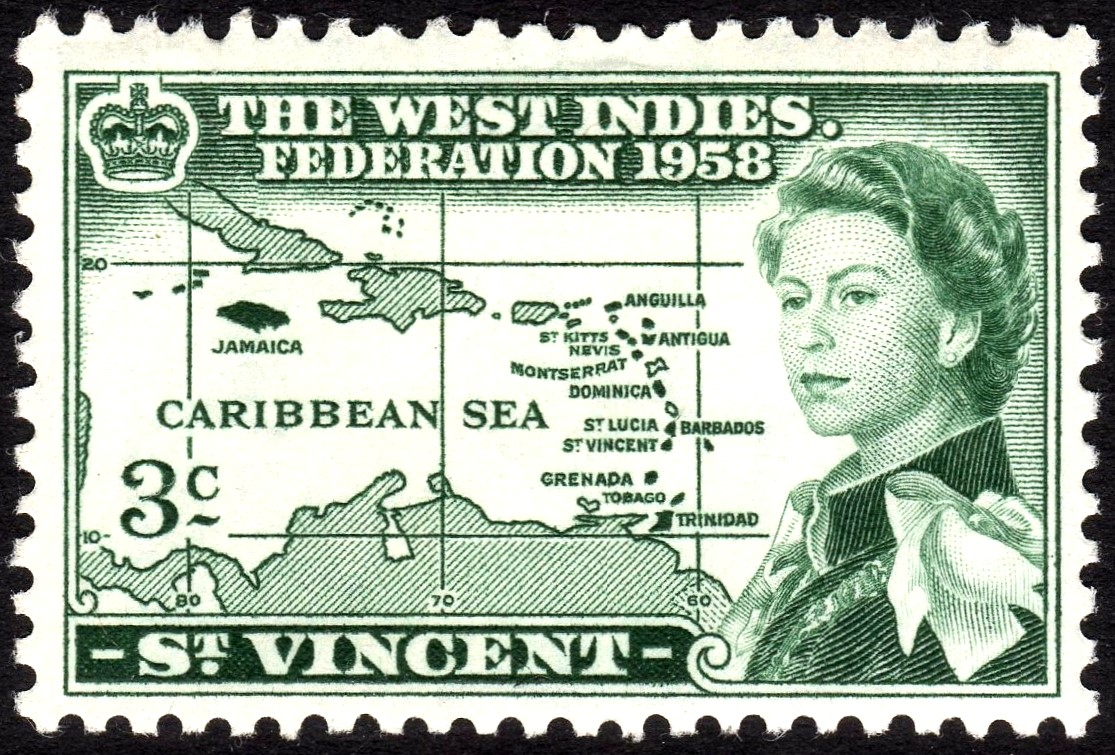
St. Vincent

1963 - Freedom From Hunger

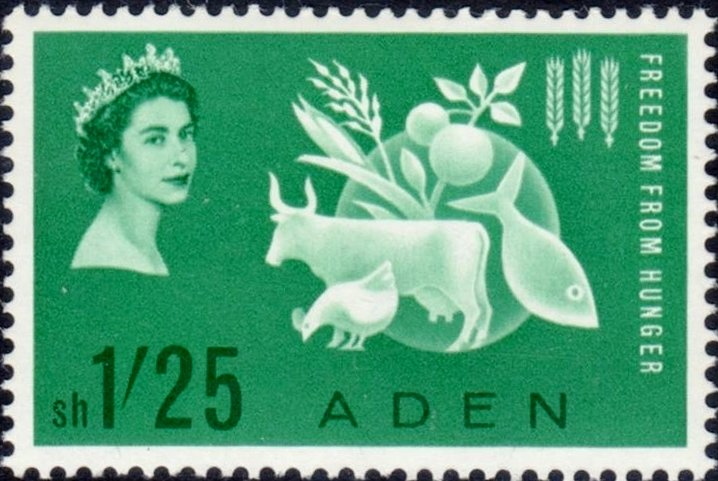
Aden

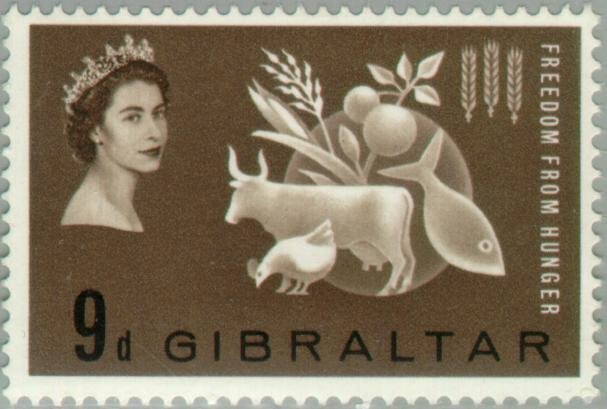
Gibraltar

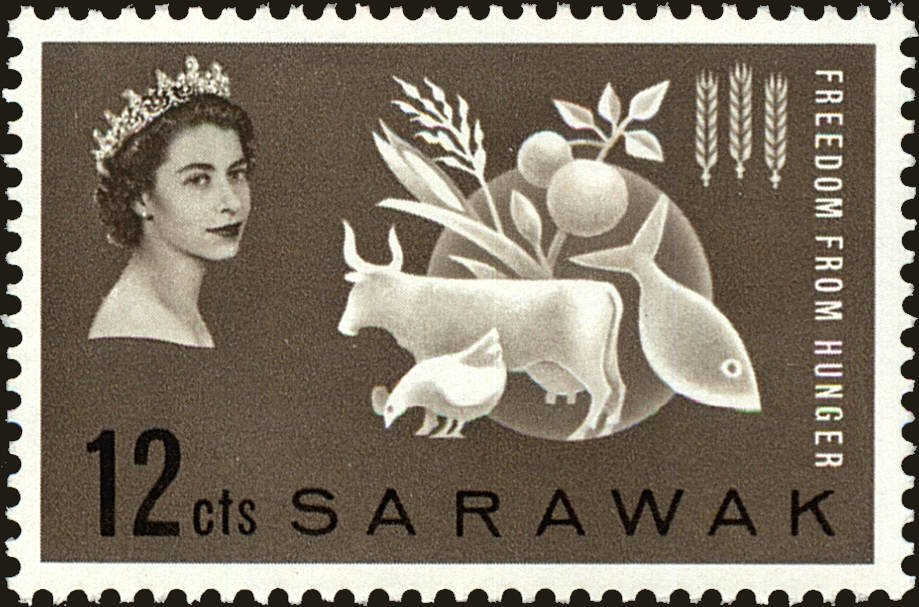
Sarawak

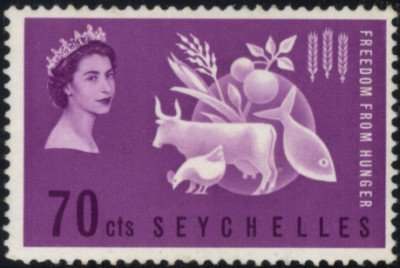
Seychelles

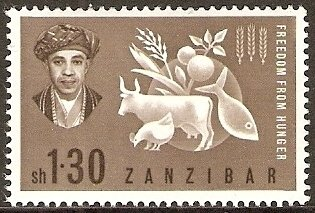
Zanzibar

1963 - Red Cross Centenary

1964 - Shakespeare

1965 - International Telecommunication Union

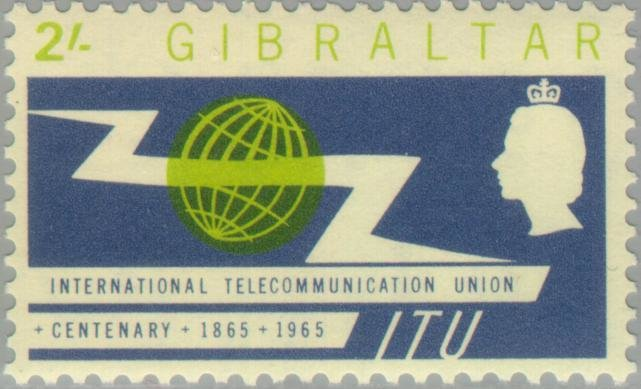
Gibraltar

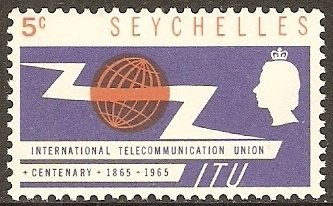
Seychelles

1965 - International Cooperation

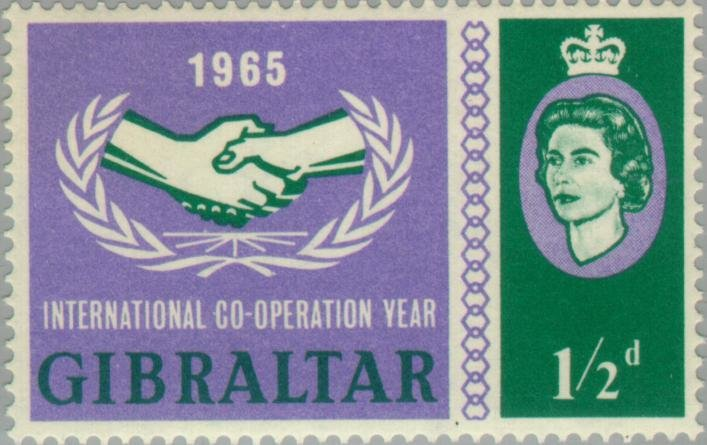
Gibraltar

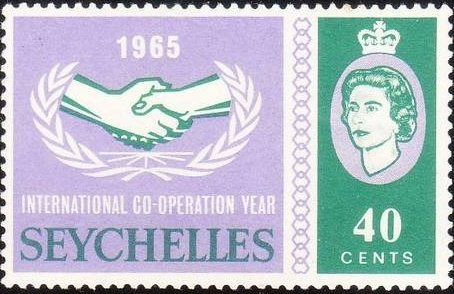
Seychelles

1966 - Churchill Memorial

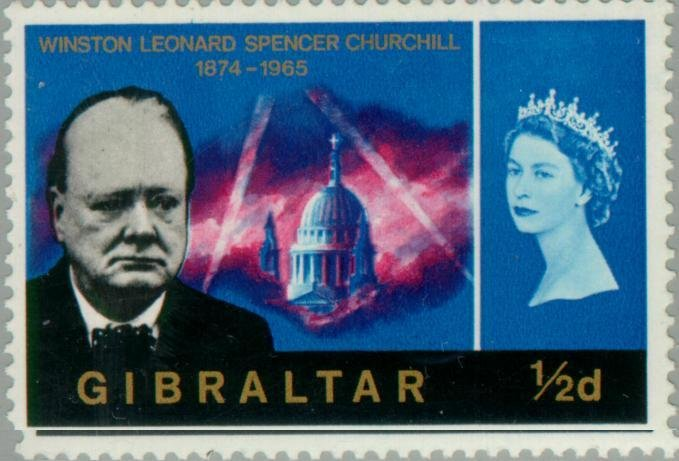
Gibraltar

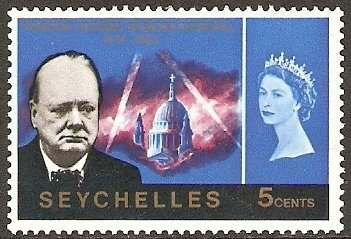
Seychelles

1966 - Football World Cup

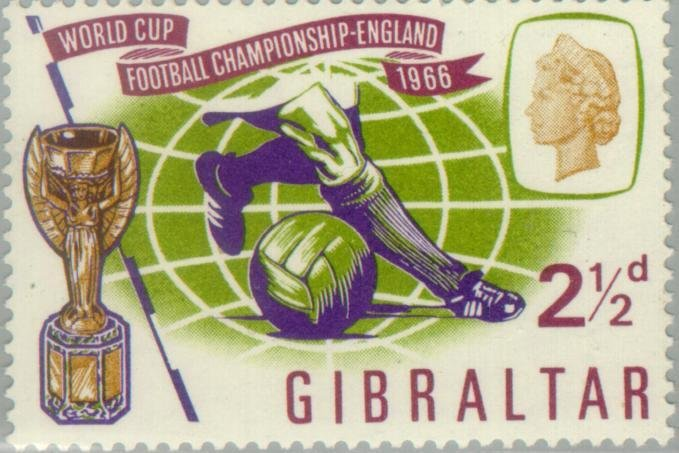
Gibraltar

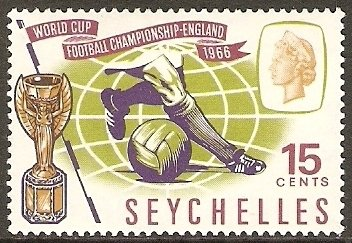
Seychelles

1966 - U.N.E.S.C.O Issue

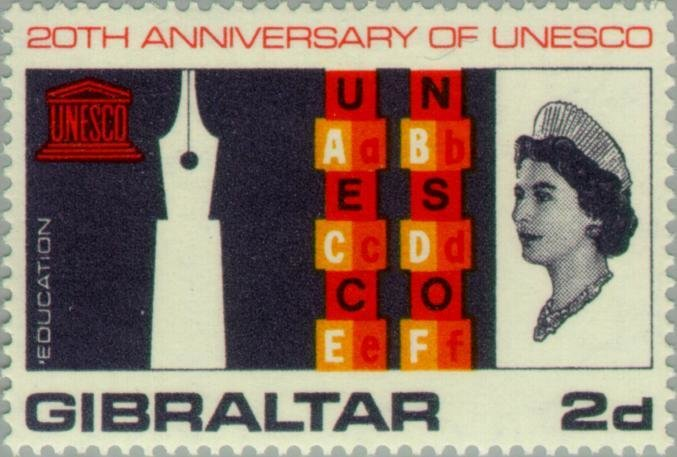
Gibraltar

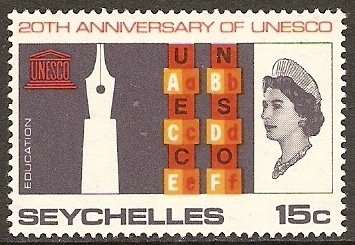
Seychelles

1966 - World Health Organization

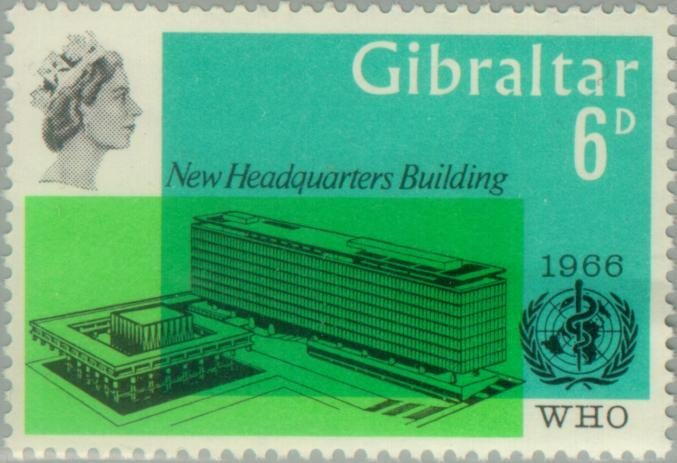
Gibraltar

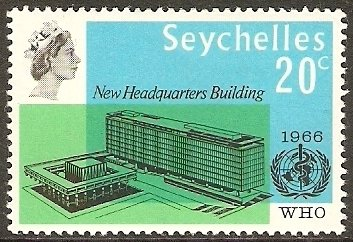
Seychelles

1966 - Royal Visit to the Caribbean

1972 - Royal Silver Wedding

1973 - Royal Wedding Princess Anne

1974 - Churchill Centenary

1977 - Royal Silver Jubilee

1978 - 25th Anniversary of Queen Elizabeth's Coronation

1980 - Queen Mothers 80th Birthday

1981 - Charles and Diana Royal Wedding

1982 - Princess Diana 21st and other Birthdays

1985 - Life and Times of Elizabeth the Queen Mother

1990 - Queen Mother's 90th Birthday

1997 - Queen Elizabeth Golden Wedding

== French omnibus issues ==
1931 - Colonial Exposition

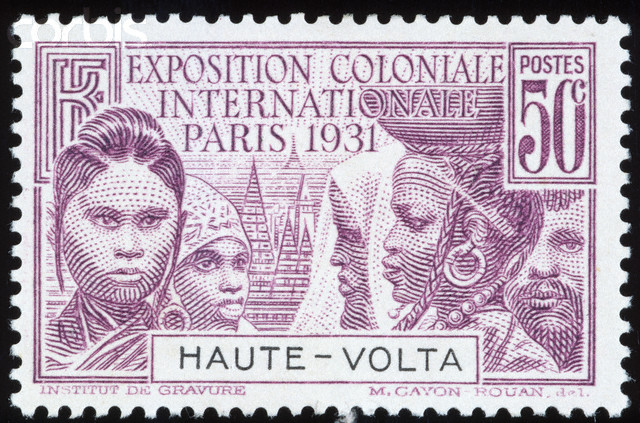
French Upper Volta

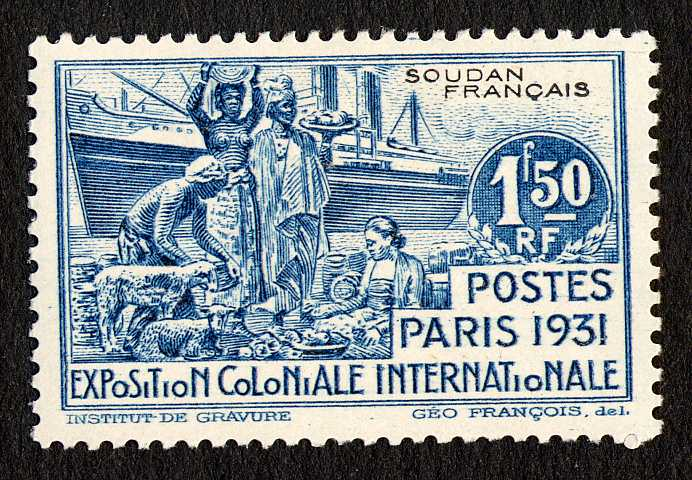
French Sudan

1937 - International Exposition in Paris

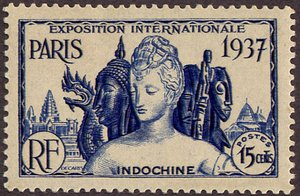
French Indochina

1938 - Pierre and Marie Curie

1939 - Rene Caillie

1939 - New York World's Fair

1939 - 150th Anniversary of the Revolution

1942 - Protection of the Infants

1942 - Colonial Education Fund

1944 - Marianne Red Cross

1945 - Felix Eboue

1946 - Victory Anniversary

1946 - Chad to the Rhine

1949 - UPU Anniversary

1950 - Tropical Medicine

1952 - Military Medals

1954 - Liberation Anniversary

== Other omnibus issuers ==
The omnibus remains popular with countries whose philatelic marketing is handled by the Inter-Governmental Philatelic Corporation as it enables those countries to market their stamps into the lucrative United States and European thematic stamp market by featuring subjects popular in those countries. These issues have, however, been criticised for not being relevant to the culture of the participating countries, for instance stamps featuring Disney characters issued by poor African countries.

== Commercialisation ==
While most earlier omnibus issues were genuine attempts to help a group of countries celebrate an anniversary or event, the fact that these became popular with stamp collectors tempted issuing authorities to bring out more stamps than would have otherwise been thought necessary. These were often heavily marketed.

== See also ==
- Colonial Exposition Issue
- Coronation issue
- Joint issue
- Key type stamp
