= Fröhlich =

Fröhlich is a German language surname meaning cheerful. Also spelled Frölich, Froelich, Froehlich, Frohlich or Frolich, the surname may refer to:

- Abraham Emanuel Fröhlich, German evangelist, theologian and writer
- Adolf Froelich, Polish inventor, dentist and officer
- Albrecht Fröhlich, German Jewish mathematician
  - Fröhlich Prize, prize of the London Mathematical Society, in memory of Albrecht Fröhlich
- Alexandra Fröhlich (1966 or 1967–2025), German journalist and writer
- Alfred Fröhlich, Austrian-American pharmacologist and neurologist
- Alfredo Frohlich, American businessman
- Charlotta Frölich, Swedish historian and agronomist
- Danny Frolich, American artist from New Orleans
- Edward Fröhlich Haskell, scientist and philosopher
- Erasmus Fröhlich (1700–1758), Austrian Jesuit natural philosopher
- Eric Froehlich (born 1984), American poker player
- Erich Froelich (1937–2023), German-Canadian wrestler
- Eva Margareta Frölich, Swedish-Latvian visionary writer
- Franz Anton Gottfried Frölich (1805–1878), German entomologist
- Gertrud Nüsken (born Fröhlich, 1917–1972), German chess master
- Gustav Fröhlich, German actor
- Harold E. Froehlich (1923–2007), American engineer who designed deep-diving exploratory submarine
- Harold Vernon Froehlich, American politician from Wisconsin
- Herbert Fröhlich (1905–1991), German-born British physicist
- Jack Froehlich, American rocket scientist
  - Froelich (crater), a crater on the Moon named after him
- Jacob Frolich (1837-1890), German-born American politician
- Jean-Pierre Frohlich, American dancer and balletmaster
- Johannes Frederik Fröhlich (1806–1860), Danish violinist, conductor and composer
- John Froelich, American inventor of the first gasoline-powered tractor
- Josef Aloys Frölich (1766–1841), German doctor, botanist and entomologist
- Jürg Martin Fröhlich, Swiss mathematician and theoretical physicist
- Katharina Fröhlich (1801–1879), German lover of the poet Franz Grillparzer
- Lili Frohlich-Bume (1886–1981), Austrian art historian
- Linda Fröhlich, German basketball player
- Michael von Fröhlich (1740–1814), Austrian general
- Paul Frölich, German politician
- Paul Froehlich, American politician from Illinois
- Peter Gay (born Peter Fröhlich), historian
- Samuel Heinrich Froehlich (1803–1857), evangelist
- USS Elizabeth M. Froelich (SP-380), US Navy minesweeper in commission from 1917 to 1919
- Tomasz Froelich (born 1988), German politician

== See also ==
- Adiposogenital dystrophy, also known as "Babinski-Fröhlich syndrome" or "Frölich's syndrome"
- Dunkelfelder, grape variety also known as "Farbtraube Froelich" or "Froelich V 4-4" after the grape breeder Gustav Adolf Froelich (1847–1912)
- Frölicher spectral sequence, a mathematical tool in the theory of complex manifolds
- Phyllis Frelich, American actress
