= Anyon (disambiguation) =

Anyon is a type of quasiparticle.

Anyon may also refer to:

- Jean Anyon (1941–2013), American critical theorist
- Joe Anyon (born 1986), English football goalkeeper
- James Anyon (born 1983), former cricketer
- Alan D. Anyon (born 1931), British philatelist

== See also ==
- Anion, a negatively charged ion
