= Vrolijk =

Vrolijk is a Dutch surname meaning "cheerful". A variant form was Vrolik. People with the name include:

- Jan Vrolijk (1917–1998), Dutch canoeist
- Maarten Vrolijk (1919–1994), Dutch journalist, poet, and Labour Party politician
- Paul Vrolijk (born 1964), Dutch Anglican Archdeacon of North West Europe
- Ton Vrolijk (born 1958), Dutch track cyclist

Vrolik

- Agnites Vrolik (1810–1894), Dutch politician, Ministers of Finance 1854–58
- Willem Vrolik (1801–1863), Dutch anatomist and pathologist

== See also ==
- Fröhlich, German surname of the same origin
