= Postage stamps and postal history of Colombia =

History of Postage stamps in Colombia

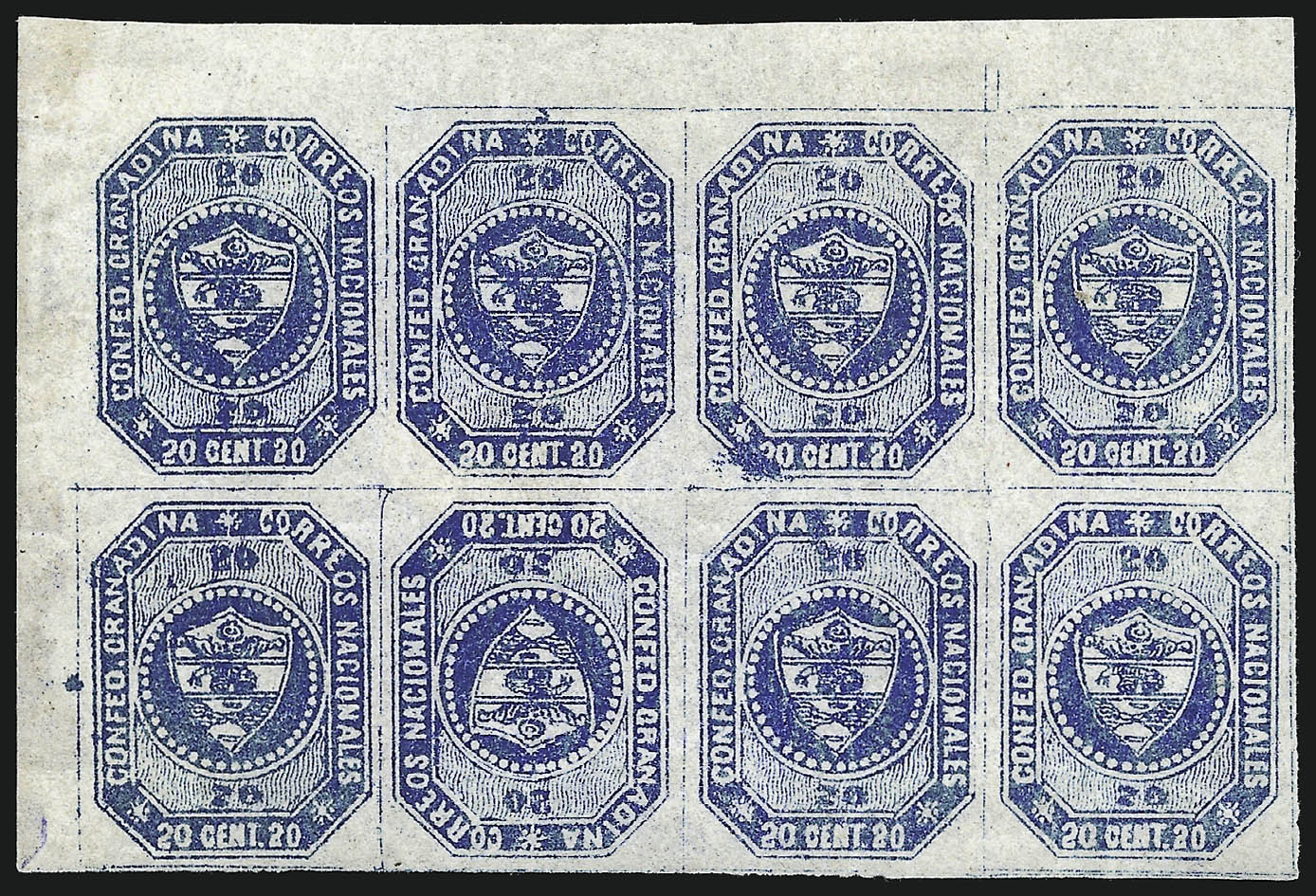
Granadine Confederation, 1859 20c blue. Stone A, Positions 1-4, 12-15, block of eight with top left corner sheet margins, containing the inverted transfer, Position 13, forming a tete-beche multiple with adjoining stamps

Colombia is a country in north-western South America. Colombia is bordered by Venezuela, Brazil, Ecuador, Peru, Panama and the Caribbean Sea and the Pacific Ocean. With a population of over 45 million people, Colombia has the second largest population in South America, after Brazil. The capital is Bogotá.

== Pre-Adhesive period ==
In 1514, Don Lorenzo Galindez de Carvajal by a royal warrant was appointed the hereditary title and duties of Correo Mayor of the Indias and lands to be discovered. The Correo Mayor represented the office of Postmaster General. Many years passed before a descendant of Don Carvajal arrived in Lima (Peru) to take office. They established a postal service in Peru and part of what is today Ecuador, using the old Inca mail runners, the Chasquis, as well as the existing routes. References show that the Correo Mayor officials didn’t start operating in Colombian territory until about 1717. The Correo Mayor period ended in 1768, when the Spanish Crown took back the postal services monopoly and named José Antonio de Pando Postmaster General of the Viceroyalties of Peru and New Granada. He travelled throughout the countries and established new postal routes, appointed administrators and set tariffs.

A very detailed and precise set of rules on how a postal system should work, now known as the Pando Manuscript, was used until about 1822, when General Santander established new routes and rates in the new Republic of Colombia. However, there are records of letters and mail from as early as 1534, letters sent to the Consejo de Indias by the first conquerors. From that time until well into the 18th century, mail was carried within the country but organised privately by Chasquis. These letters contain manuscript markings like "By Chasqui", "In his hands" or "By a friend", terms used well into the 19th century. The first postal markings were introduced by Pando as early as 1771.

== United States of New Granada ==
The Granadine Confederation (Spanish: Confederación Granadina) was a short-lived federal republic established in 1858 as a result of a constitutional change replacing the Republic of New Granada. It comprised the present day nations of Colombia and Panama and even parts of northwestern Brazil. It was replaced by the United States of Colombia after another constitutional change in 1861.

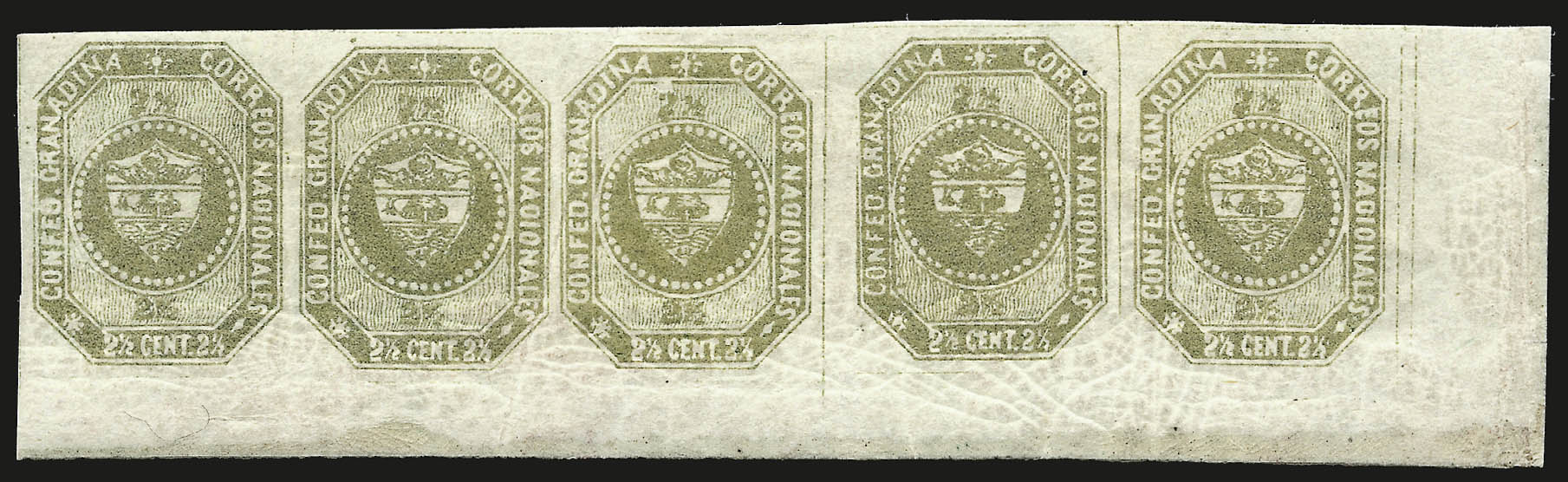
Granadine Confederation, 1859 first issued stamps

=== First stamps ===
The first stamp of Colombia was a black 20 centavos revenue stamp issued on 1 September 1858.

The central government of the Granadine Confederation, was responsible for inter-state services and all outgoing and incoming mail to and from other countries. For these purposes national postage stamps were issued from 1859, bearing the inscription Confed. Granadina Correos Nacionales. In 1861 a series of stamps in five values was issued inscribed Estados Unidos de Nueva Granada, or the United States of New Granada.

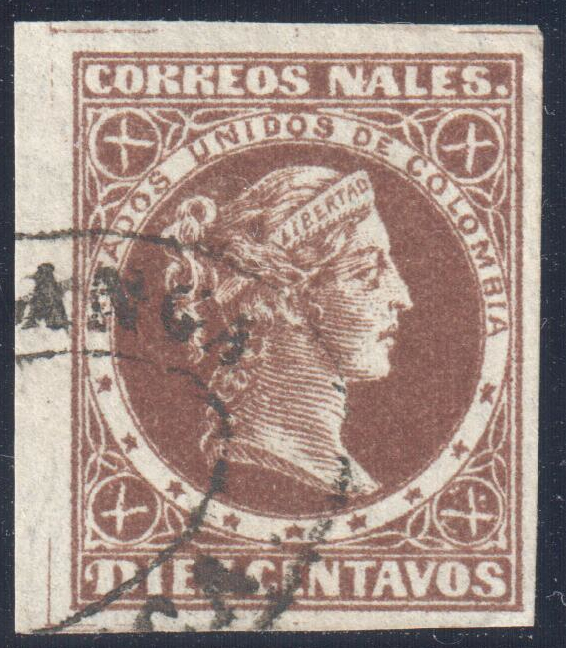
United States of Colombia, 1877 10 centavos stamp

== United States of Colombia ==
Later in 1861 the United States of New Granada became the United States of Colombia and stamps were issued marked Estados Unidos de Colombia until 1886.

== States of Colombia ==
The States of Colombia existed from February 27, 1855, in the Republic of New Granada and the Granadine Confederation, where they were called "federal states". In the United States of Colombia they were called "sovereign states". The Congress of the Grenadine Confederation passed a law on 3 June 1859 authorising the sovereign states to establish their own postal services. In 1863 the United States of Colombia, as it had now become, made up of eight sovereign states, confirmed and authorised the states’ power to operate their own postal services and issue postage stamps. These were only valid for postage within the state, although a few examples are known of stamps that were sent to other states and even to Europe.

The sovereign states of Colombia:

- Antioquia
- Bolívar
- Boyacá
- Cundinamarca
  - Tolima. On July 12, 1861, after raising in arms against the constitutional government of president Mariano Ospina Rodríguez, general Tomás Cipriano de Mosquera created the Sovereign State of Tolima, carved out of the Sovereign State of Cundinamarca
- Cauca
- Magdalena
- Panama
- Santander
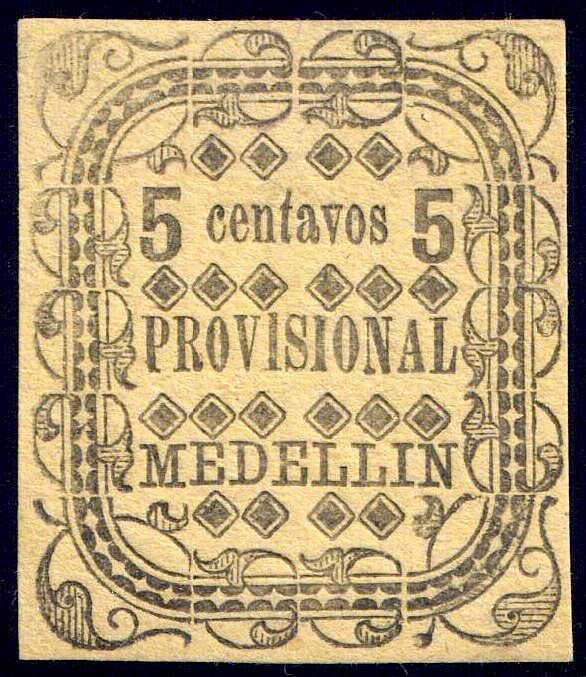
Antioquia 1888, 5c Medellín issue

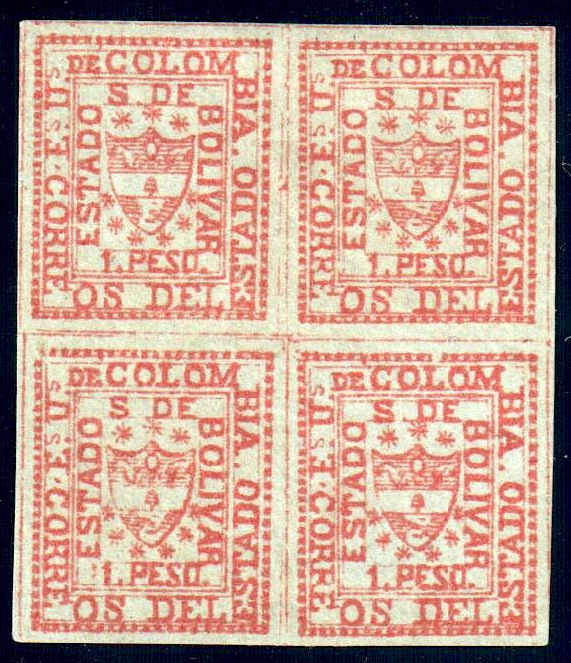
Bolivar 1863, 1 peso red, block of four

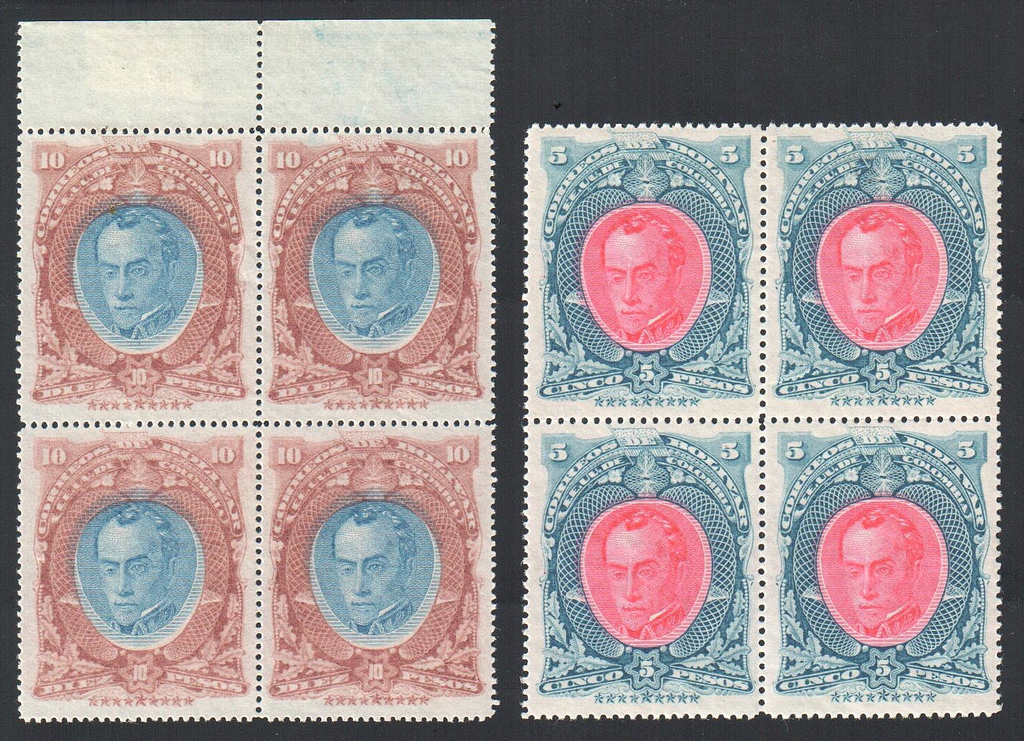
Bolivar 1882, 5 and 10 pesos

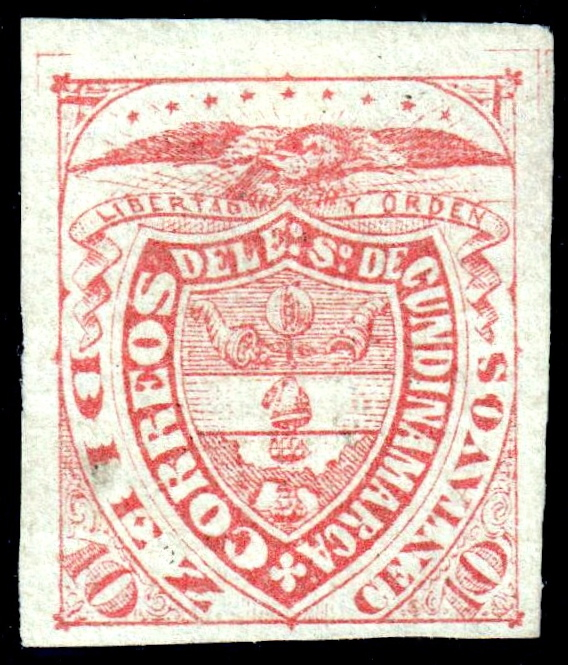
Cundinamarca 1877, 10c

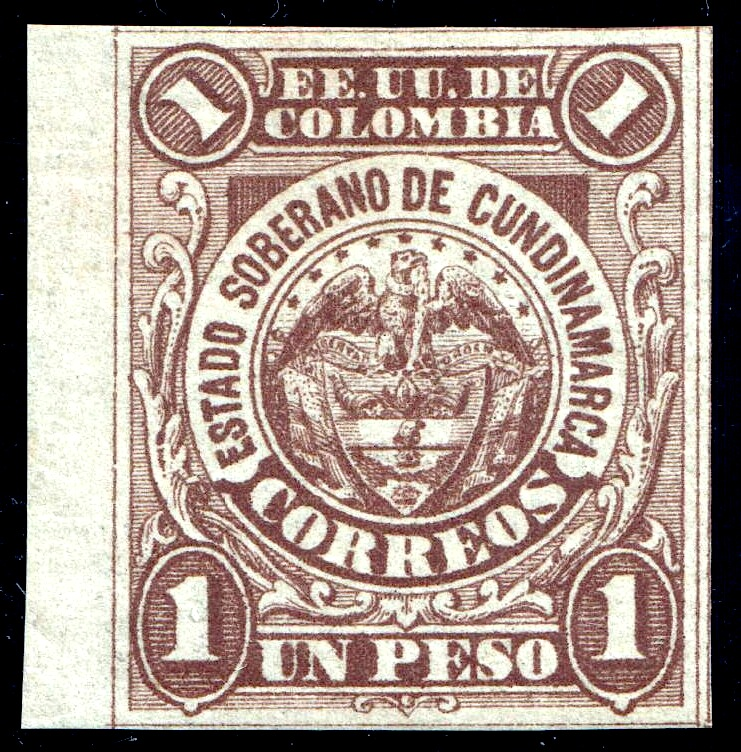
Cundinamarca 1882, 1 peso

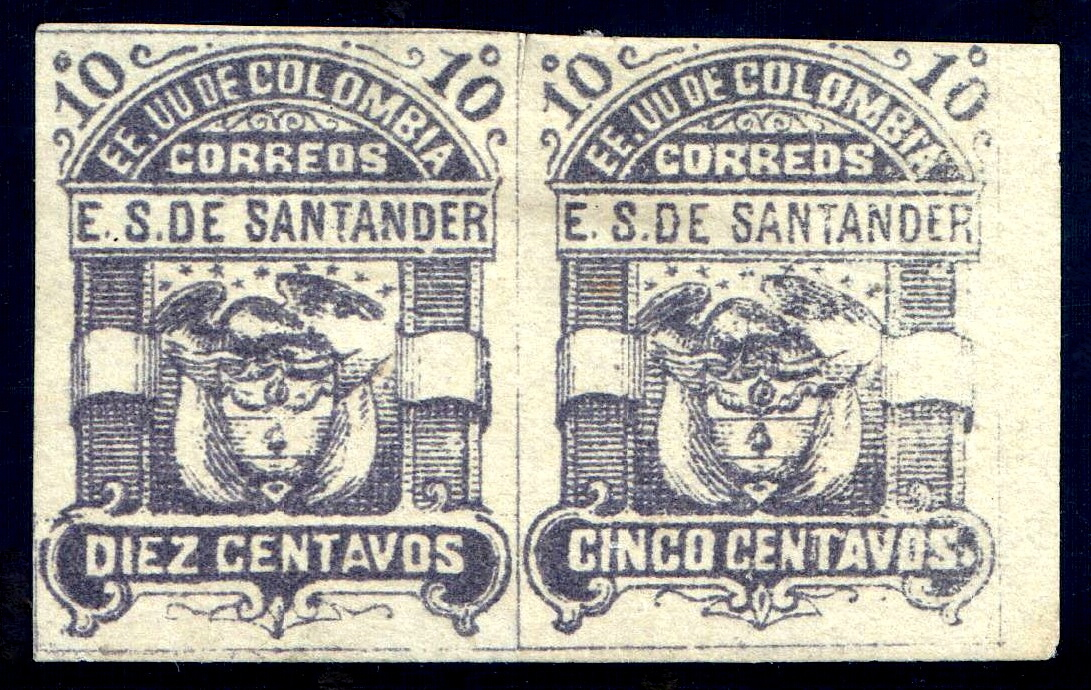
Santander 1886, 10c pair with transfer error 'CINCO CENTAVOS'

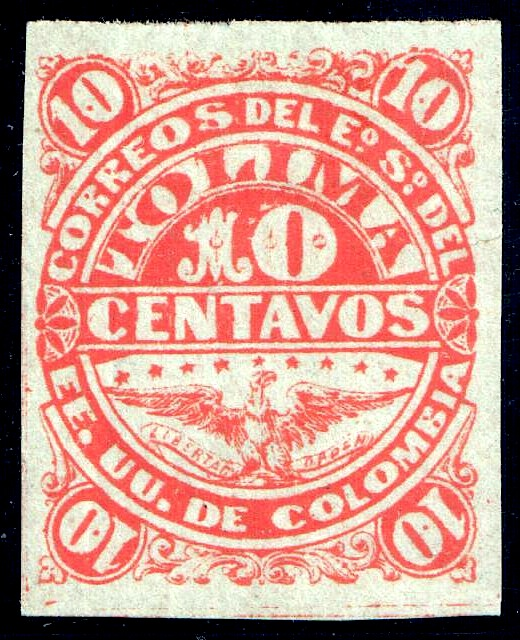
Tolima 1883, 10c

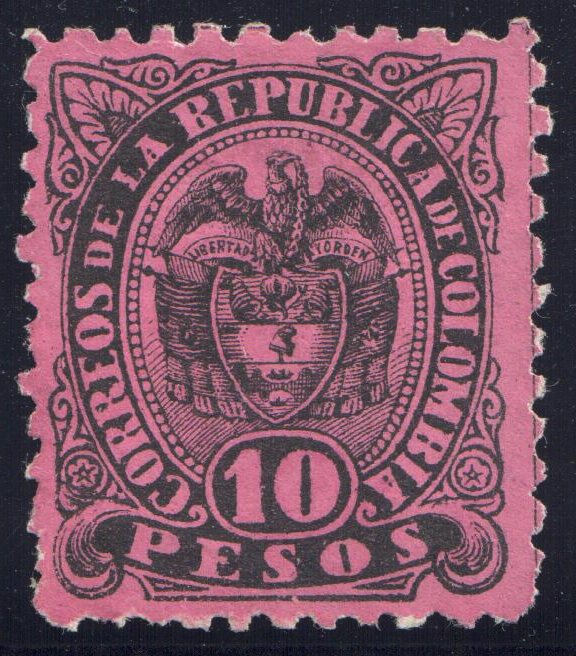
Republic of Colombia, 1888 10 pesos stamp

== Republic of Colombia ==
In 1886 the newly created Republic of Colombia abolished the states and divided the country into the departments of Colombia. The constituent states of Colombia continued to issue separate stamps until the early 1900s however. The stamps issued by the Republic of Colombia were marked Republica de Colombia, the fourth name change since 1859, and subsequently changed into just Colombia.

== Chamber of Commerce mail service ==
The Cúcuta Chamber of Commerce was founded around the year 1890 as a non-profit entity of the government of Colombia, attached to the Ministry of Industry, Commerce and Tourism. The Chamber organized a mail service named Correo del Comercio (Business mail), a service which operated between 1890 and 1915. The mail service was intended to improve the communication between the Santander Provinces and Venezuela and to create faster access to the coast of Maracaibo. Mail was handled between Cúcuta and the golf of Maracaibo in Venezuela, which at the time had a permanent marine communication with Europe and North America. The chamber never issued stamps for this service, only a few registration labels. Stamps of the national postal system were used at the official postage rates cancelled by various types of "CORREO DEL COMERCIO" handstamps.

== Private delivery services ==
Next to the national and postal institutions of the states, private delivery services existed of which some used its own adhesives. The legal basis for this was laid on 27 April 1859, when the Colombian Parliament of the Confederation stated by law that the Postal Service should not be the monopoly of the central government, but that the Colombian governments, businesses and even individuals should be part of it, even in the same postal routes established by the Central Government. A total of 14 entities issued stamps for their private mail service, most of them in the 1920s and 1930s. In the nineteenth century there existed two private services, the 1870 Correo Semanal Del Dorado in the Guasca District and the 1882 Barranquilla OASM delivery service.

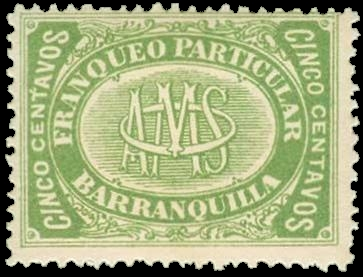
An 1882 stamp of the Barranquilla private post of Octavio Mora

=== Correo Semanal Del Dorado ===
It was believed that in the Siecha Lake (in the Guasca municipality of the Cundinamarca Department), a difficult to access lagoon at an altitude of more than 3,000 metres, the Muisca people had hidden from the Spaniards the legendary El Dorado treasure. A Colombian citizen, Enrique Urdaneta partnered with the English engineer George Crowther and acquired in 1866 the shares that enabled them to drain the lake. The mythical treasure was never discovered in this lake or any other (e.g. Lake Guatavita, Lake Parime).

As communication was difficult due to geographical reasons, a private carrier service was established in 1868. This first Colombian private carrier provided a weekly mail service of El Dorado, which transported mail from the Siecha lagoon to Bogotá, which lasted to 1870. Adhesives were created, a cliché was cut, the value of postage stamps was set to 1 real (10 centavos de peso) and printed on various available papers. The paper varies from plain white stationery, blue-striped paper, paper with watermarks, and a bluish and greenish paper up to squared notebook paper. The sheet size is not known, but there are blocks of four, some with tete-beche pairs, horizontal and vertical pairs and single stamps. Ten postally used covers are recorded between March and November 16, 1870, all related to the work on the site of the lagoon.

=== OASM delivery service ===
This delivery service was set up in Barranquilla by Octavio A. S. Mora. Letters would be collected from the Barranquilla post office, one of their private stamps affixed and delivered to the addressees on payment of the delivery charge. The service had a very limited use late in 1882. Three different 5 centavos OASM private stamps are known in green, brown and black, printed by lithography in Paris.

== Collecting Colombia ==
From the Spanish Colonial era to modern times the history of Colombia has been marked by political change and instability which is reflected in its philatelic history. Civil wars, revolts, independence of Panama and the Thousand Days War of 1899–1902 resulted in philatelic interesting material. Many areas have not yet been fully studied, leaving open possibilities for research and discoveries. Collecting opportunities include provisional issues, postal stationery, revenues, private express carriers, local city posts, SCADTA airmail, war covers and so on. A few popular areas:

=== The classic era ===
On 1 September 1858 Colombia issued its first "stamp", which was a 20 centavos revenue stamp. Exactly one year later, on 1 September 1859, the first postage stamps were put on sale. At that time Colombia was called the Granadine Confederation. The second issue appeared in 1860 and the third in September 1861, under the name of the United States of New Granada. The fourth issue followed shortly afterwards, with the inscription "United States of Colombia". Four more issues completed the classic period in 1868, with a total of 42 stamps.

At that time Colombia had about 5 million inhabitants, with a large number of people not able to read or write, and communications between Colombia and the rest of the world were limited to a few commercial companies. The main route to the ports was by boat on the Magdalena River and it took at least two weeks to reach the coast. The carrying of mail, as well as its distribution, was in the hands of personnel and companies under contract to the government. The quantities printed were extremely small in comparison with any other country during that period. This is why Colombian stamps are nowadays very scarce and of great interest to philatelists. Of the 42 stamps, only seven complete sheets of stamps are recorded, and with some stamps a pair represents the largest multiple known. Various attempts have been made to reconstruct the remaining sheets of stamps, but even after 150 years this task has not been completed. There are various stamps for which we do not have records of a single cover, another reason for collecting the very rare stamps of the classic period. At the end of the 19th century Colombia was very fashionable, which is also the reason why 39 of the 42 stamps have been extensively forged, mainly due to demand by collectors and because of the small quantities printed.

=== Manuscript and hand stamped cancellations ===
The Decree of 1859, which organized the postal service and determined the use of stamps, states that where no hand stamps, either pre-philatelic or new ones, were available, the stamps were validated by the manuscript name of the place of origin. Many smaller towns didn’t have a proper hand stamp before the 1890s, the towns that did used different hand stamps and various ink colors. Collecting the different pen or manuscript cancellations and the hand stamps is a challenging philatelic area.

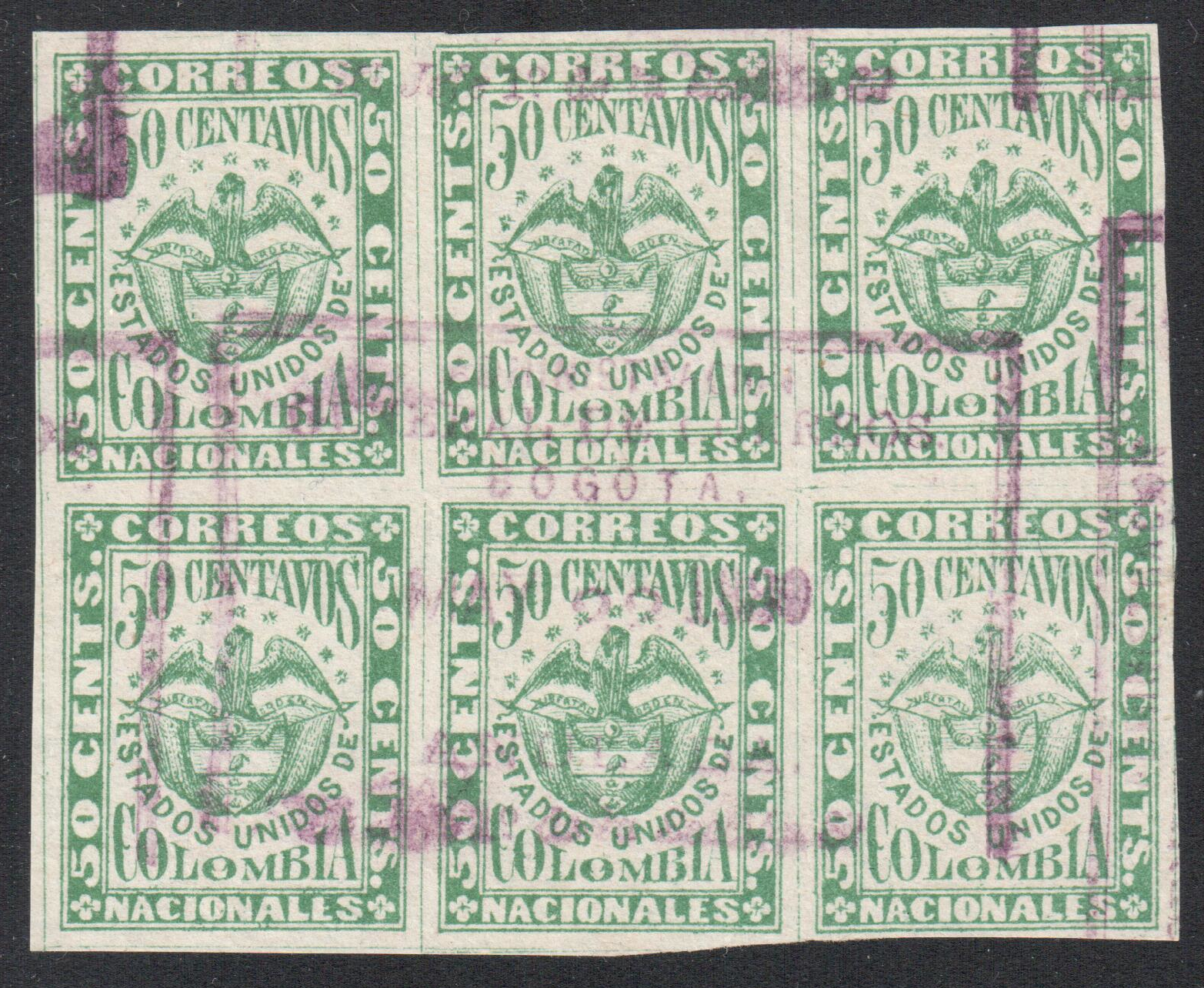
Colombia 1868, 50c block, 'Bogotá' postmark

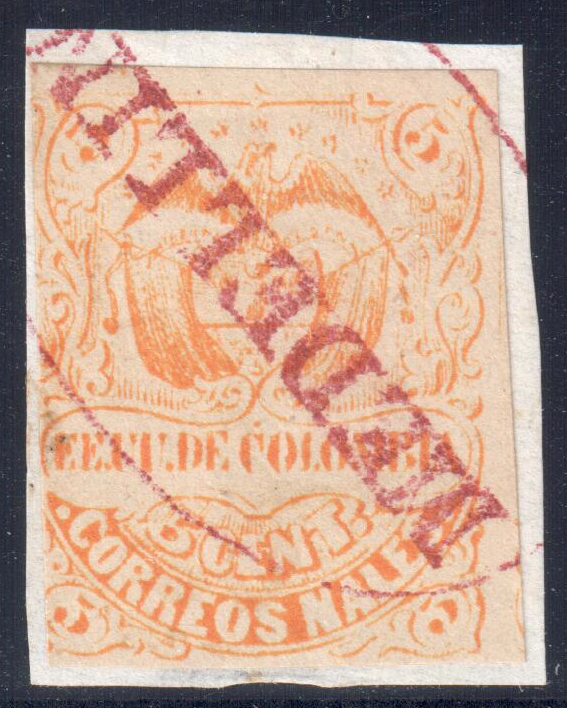
Colombia 1870, 5c, red 'Medellín' postmark

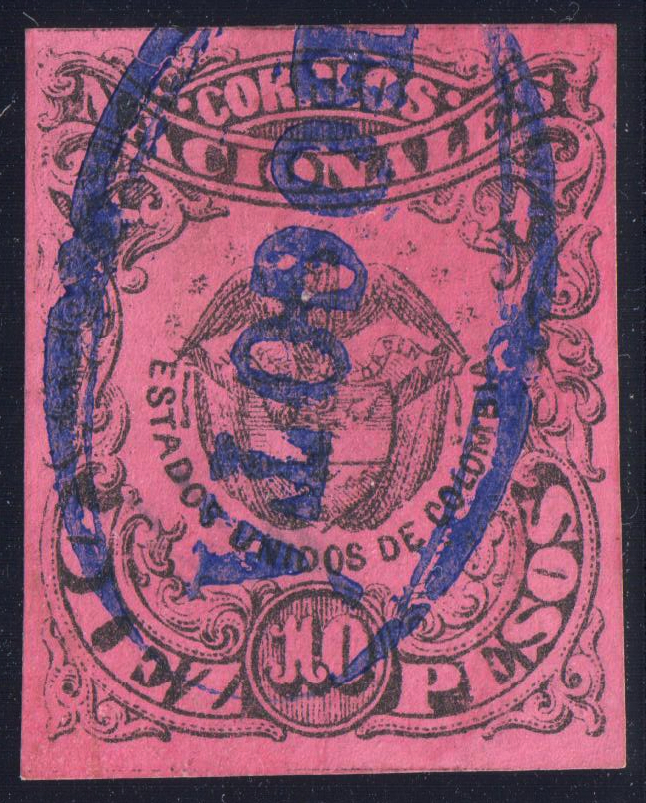
Colombia 1877, 10 pesos, blue 'Bogotá' postmark

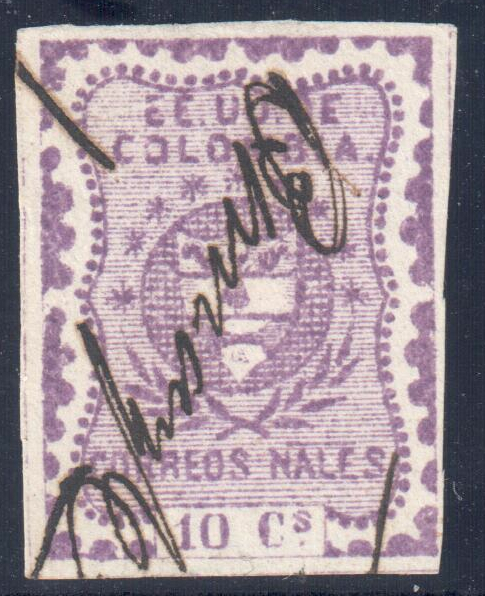
Colombia 1866, 10c lilac, manuscript cancel

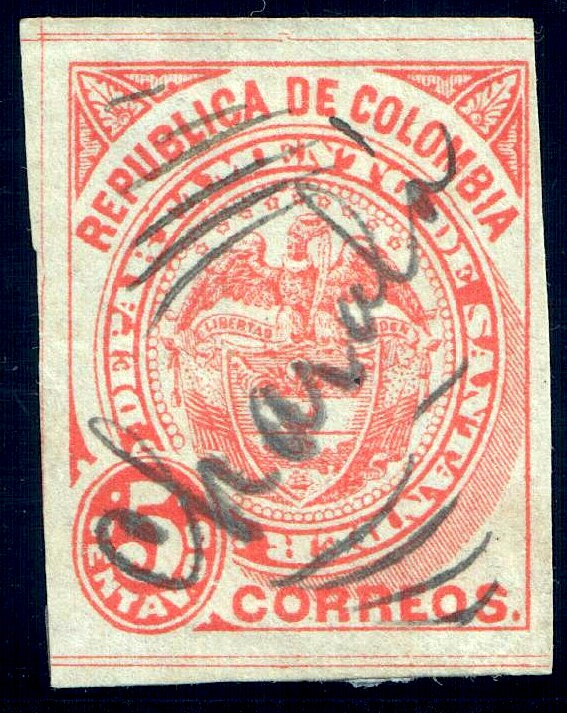
Santander 1887, 5c, manuscript cancel 'Charalá'

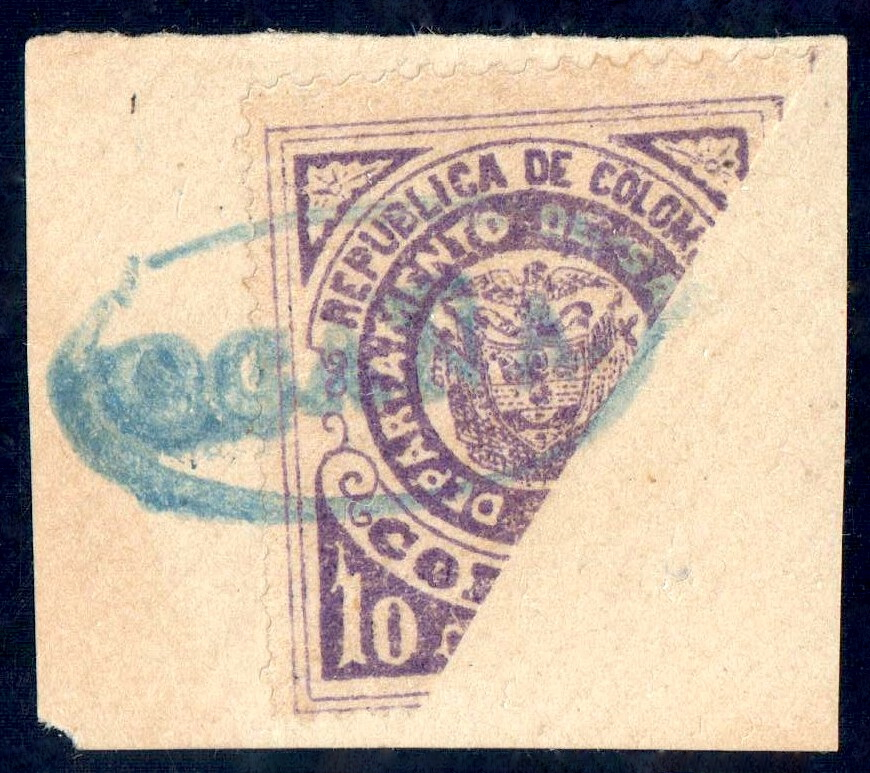
Santander 1889, bisected 10c, Ocaña postmark

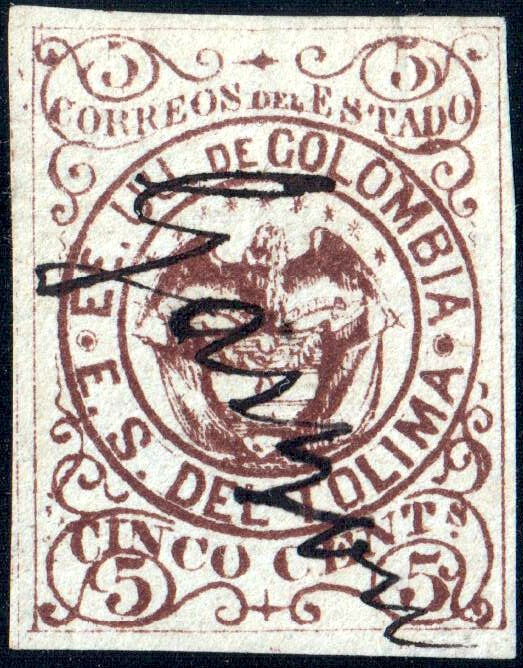
Tolima 1871, 5c brown, manuscript cancel 'Garzón'

== See also ==
- Revenue stamps of Colombia
- 1859–1900 Stamps of Colombia on Wikimedia Commons

== References and sources ==
Notes

Sources

- Fuchs, Rainer. Rainer's Colombia Pages: Carlos Valenzuela Acosta - Introduction and Historical Background of private postal services in Colombia Online article
- Fuchs, Rainer. Rainer's Colombia Pages: Correo del Comercio Online article
- Stanley Gibbons Ltd: various catalogues
