= Joseph Liesganig =

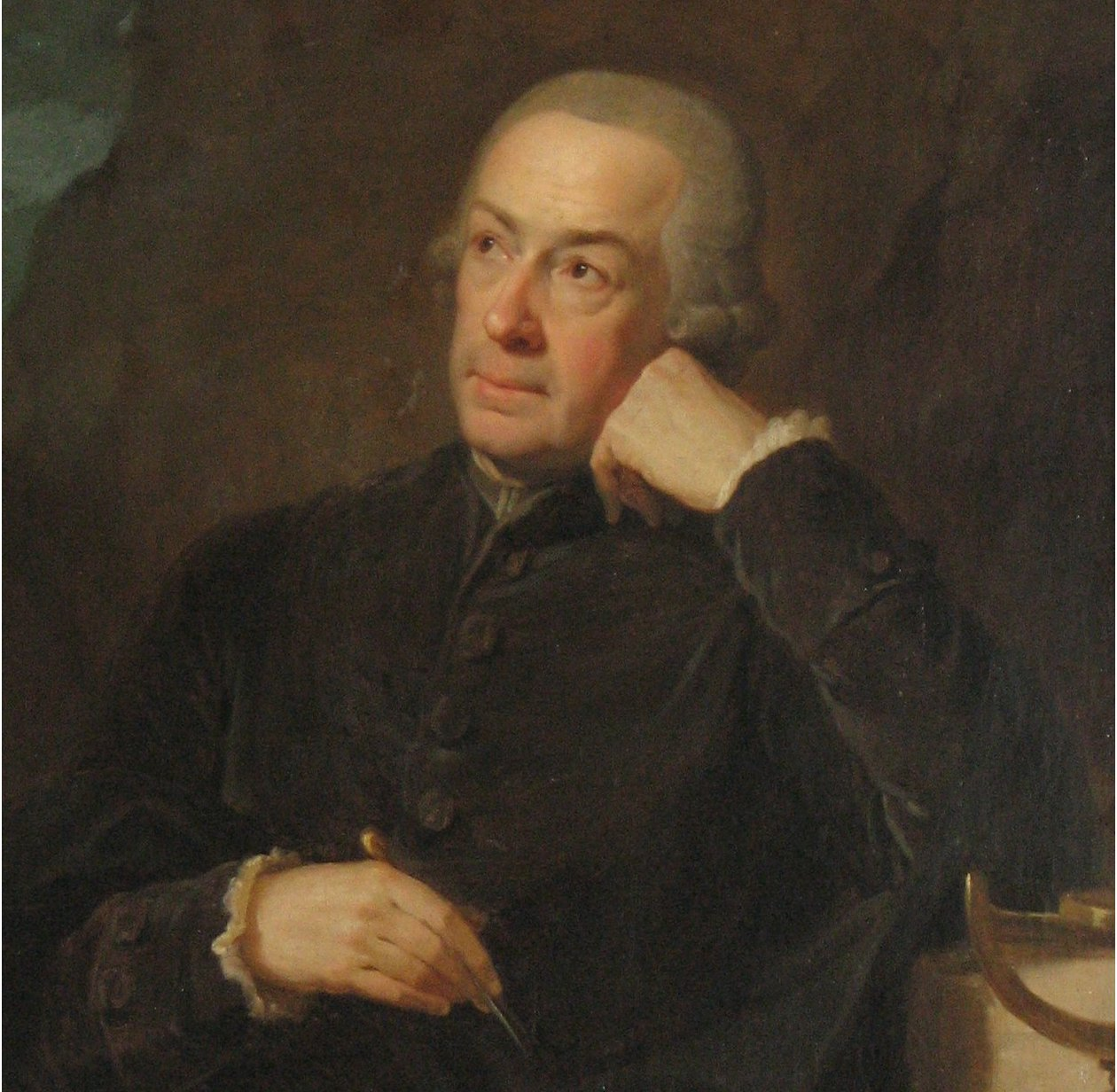
Portrait by Johann Baptist von Lampi the Elder from the Lviv National Art Gallery

Joseph Xaver Liesganig (13 February 1719 – 4 March 1799) was a Jesuit priest and geodesist who was a professor of mathematics at the University of Vienna. He taught mathematics from 1742 at the University of Graz. He was involved in measuring the extent of Austria, establishing the longitude of Vienna and in early trigonometrical mapping of the region. He was the last of the Jesuit astronomers at the Vienna observatory.

== Life and work ==
Liesganig was born to Wolfgang, Hofmeister of Graz, and Rosalie. He went to study at the Jesuit College in Vienna from 1734 and was ordained in the Society of Jesus in 1749. He taught mathematics from 1742 at the University of Graz. In 1751 he received a doctorate from the Academy in Kosice and joined an expedition into the Tatra mountains. The next year, he became a professor at the University of Vienna, while also serving at the astronomical observatory of the Jesuit College at Vienna. He succeeded Maximilian Hell in 1756 as director of the observatory. Liesganig took a keen interest on question of the exact shape of the earth, which was of great interest in the period and supported by Empress Maria Theresa. In 1757, on the instance of Ruđer Bošković, he had a zenith sector of 10 (Viennese) foot radius as well as a quadrant with two-and-half foot radius constructed by the mechanic Joseph Ramspoeck. He obtained a Graham clock with a gridiron compensation pendulum. With this equipment in place, in 1758, he established the longitude of Vienna as 48°12′34.5″. After this he was involved in 1762 in measuring a base line near Neustadt (6238 toises long, 12158 metres) and another in Marchfield (6388 toises). An arc of about 3° was measured near Vienna. He used a star reference for some of his trigonometrical work, however he made an error because not all stations used the same star as a reference, leading to errors. In 1769 he proposed the measurement of another meridian arc in Hungary, writing to Empress Maria Theresa for her support. An arc of 2° was measured between Kistelek and Csurog and he triangulated in the area to produce one of the early accurate maps of the region. Other collaborators included Karl Scherffer (1716-1783), Georg Ignaz von Metzburg (1735-1798) His Vienna triangulation was re-examined in 1806 and it was found to be in error only by about 7mm per kilometre. His book Dimensio Graduum Meridiani Viennensis et Hungarici (1770) described his cartographic work. In 1772, parts of the Russian Empire went into Austria and Liesganig was ordered to map the new territory of Galicia and Lodomeria (Volyhnia). He was assisted by Franz Xavier von Zach (1754–1832) and he moved his instruments from Vienna to the observatory at Lviv where he then worked until his death.

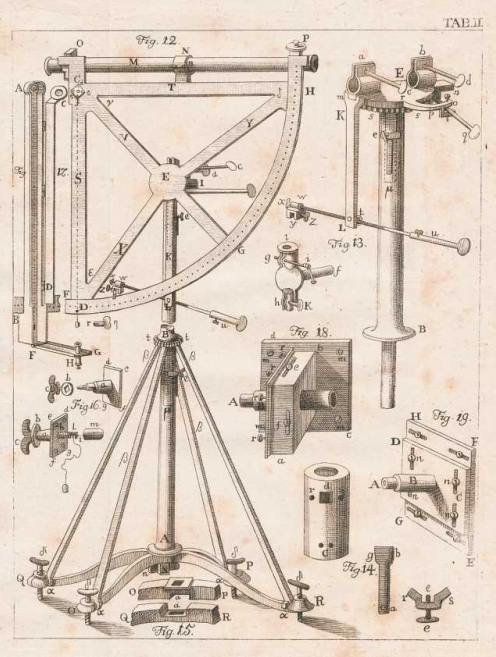
Liesganig's quadrant

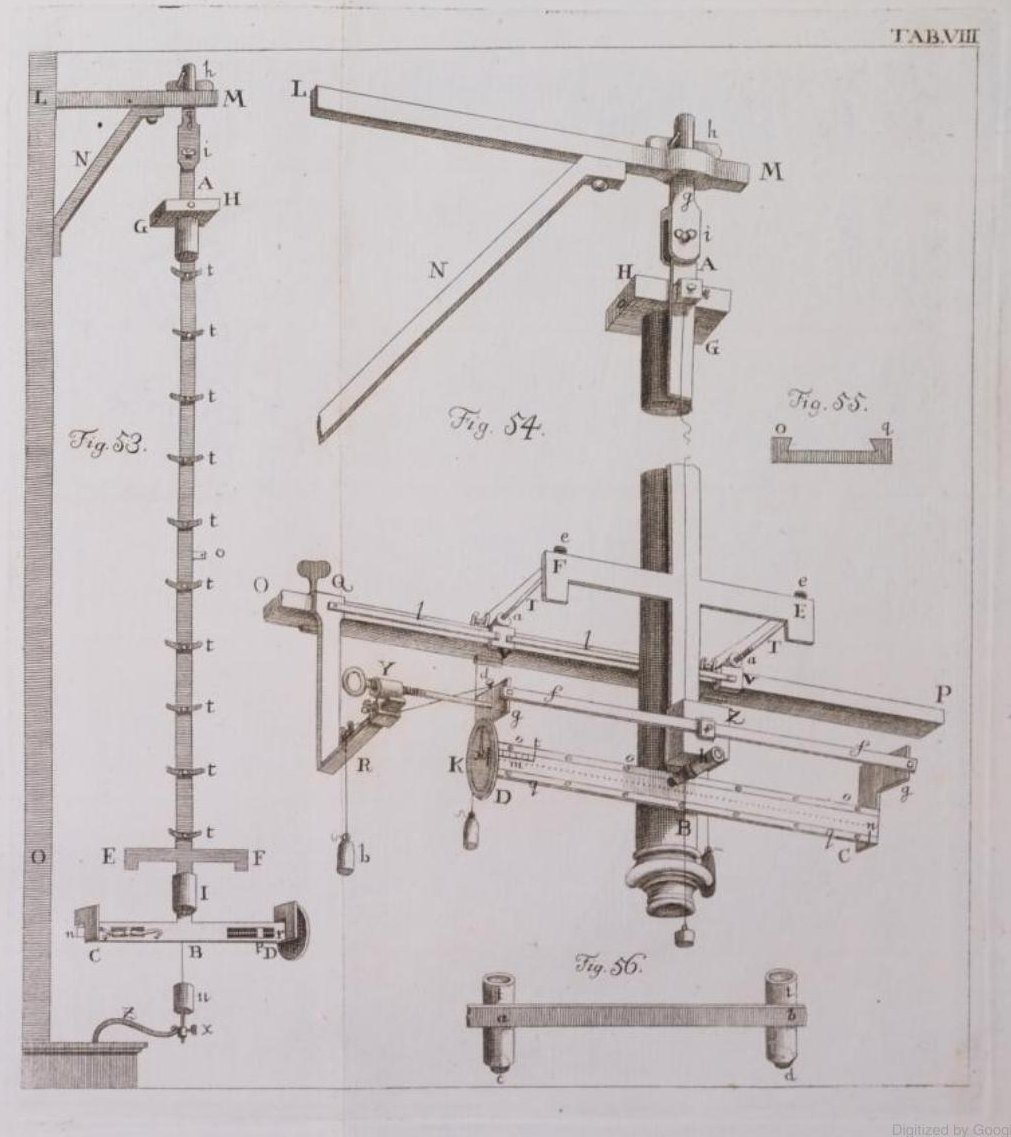
Zenith telescope

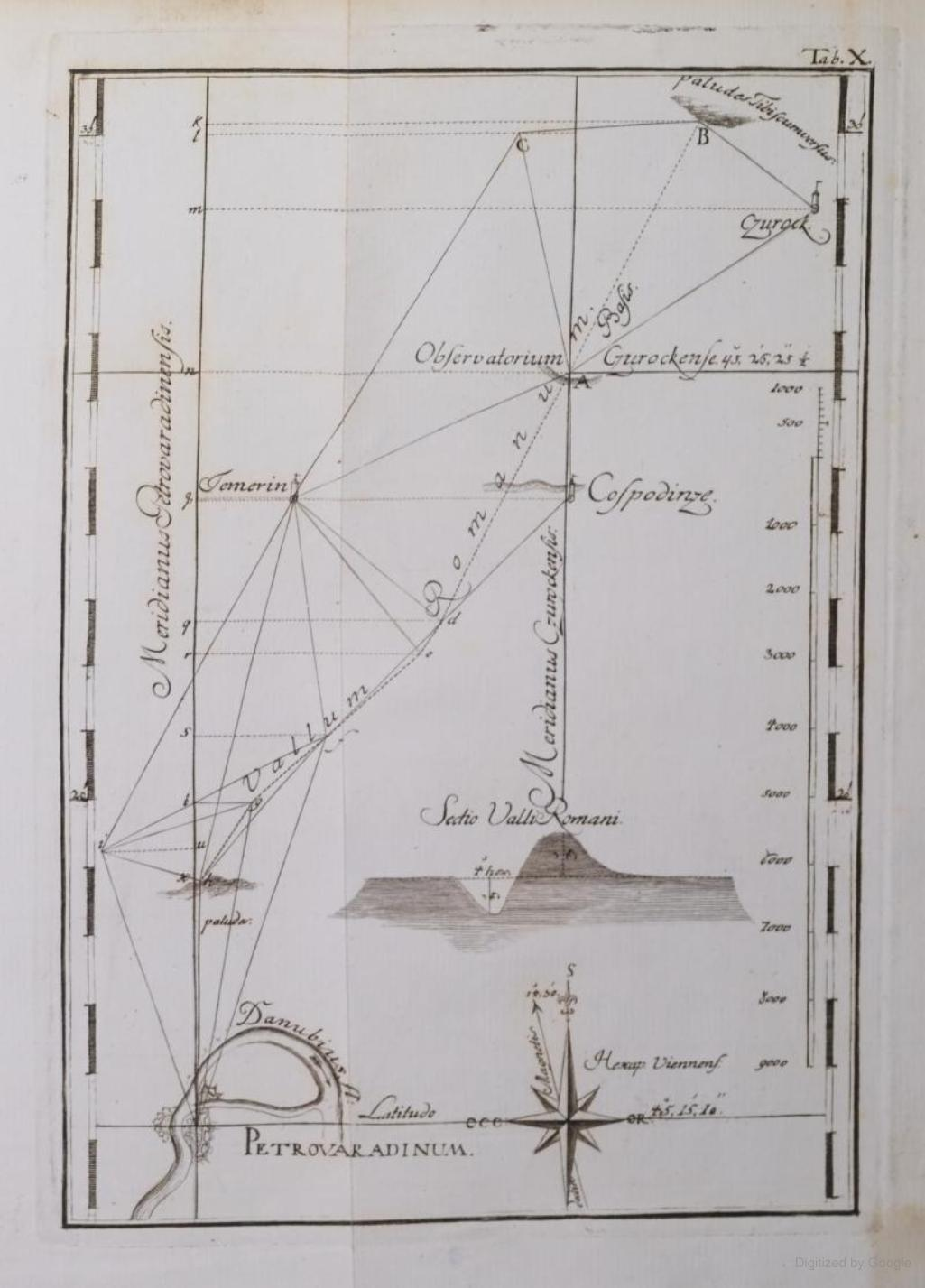
Triangulations

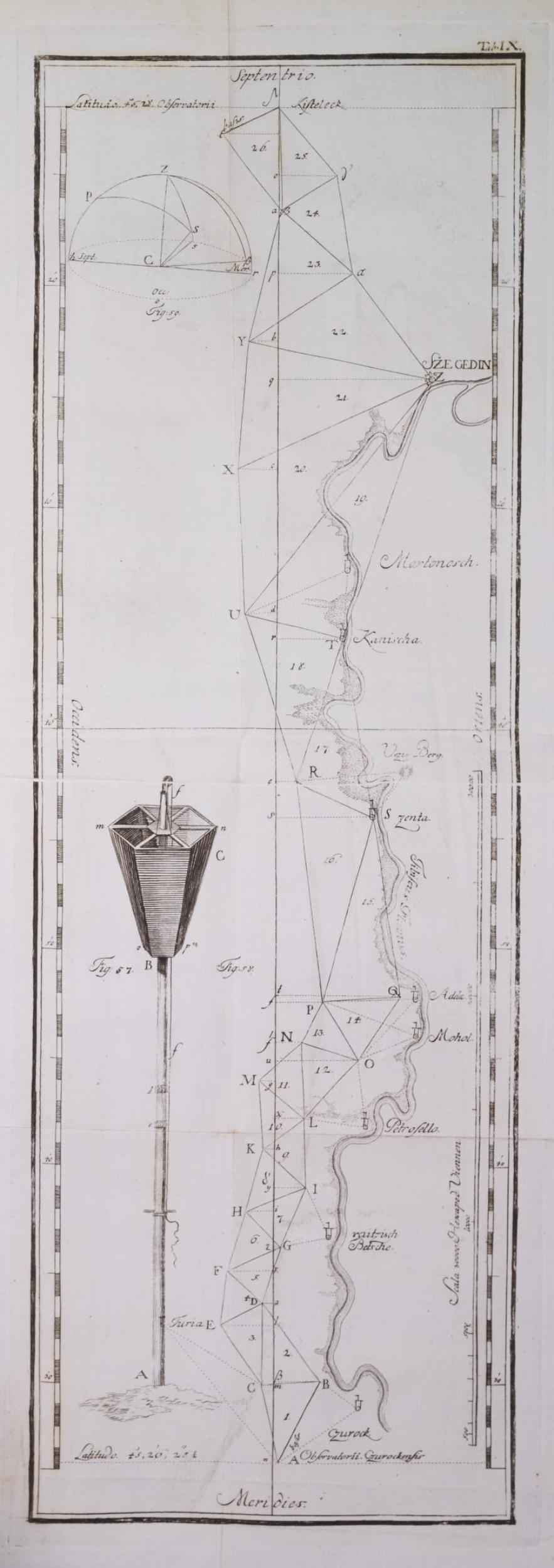
Map fragment

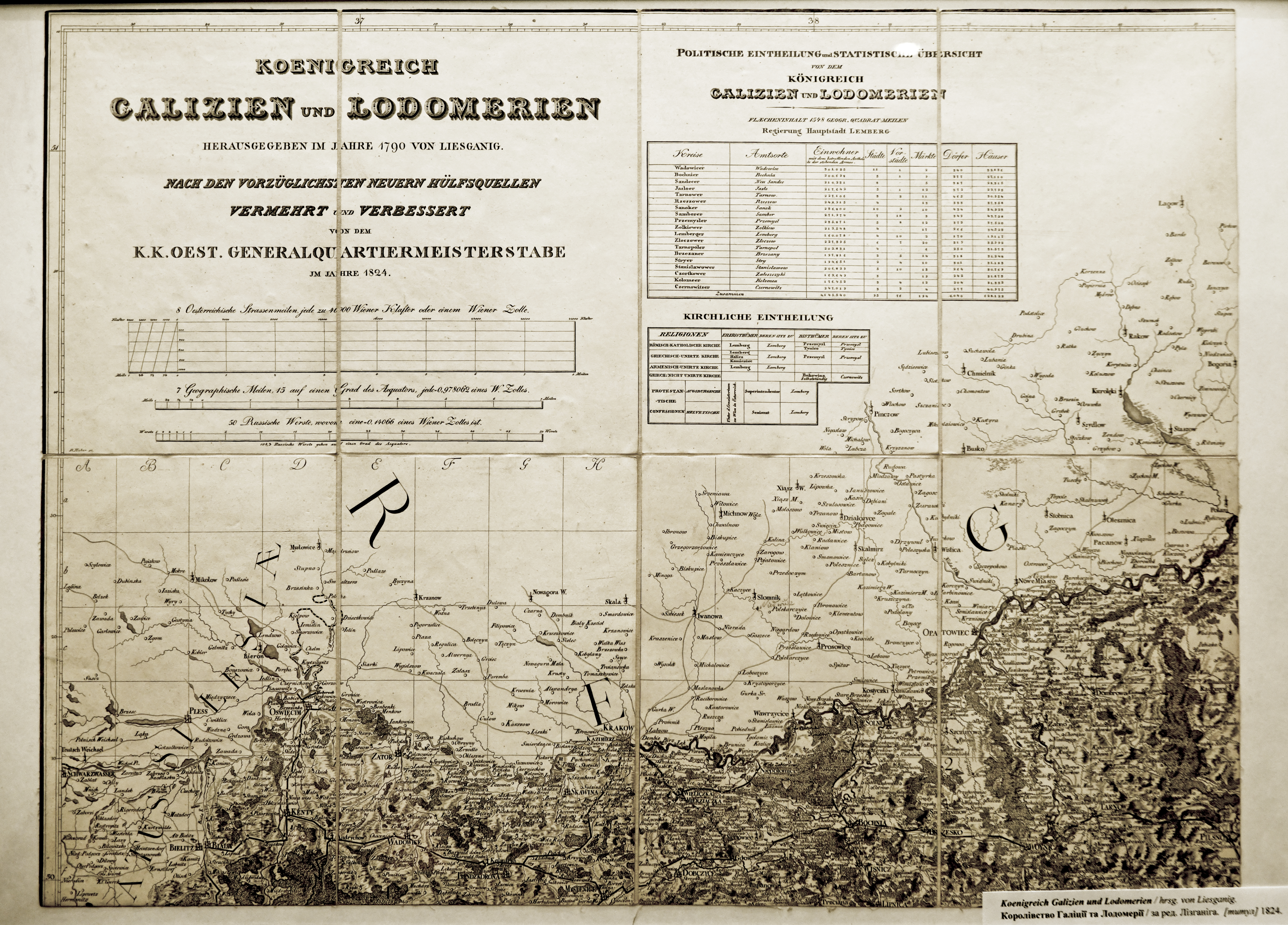
Map based on Liesganig's work

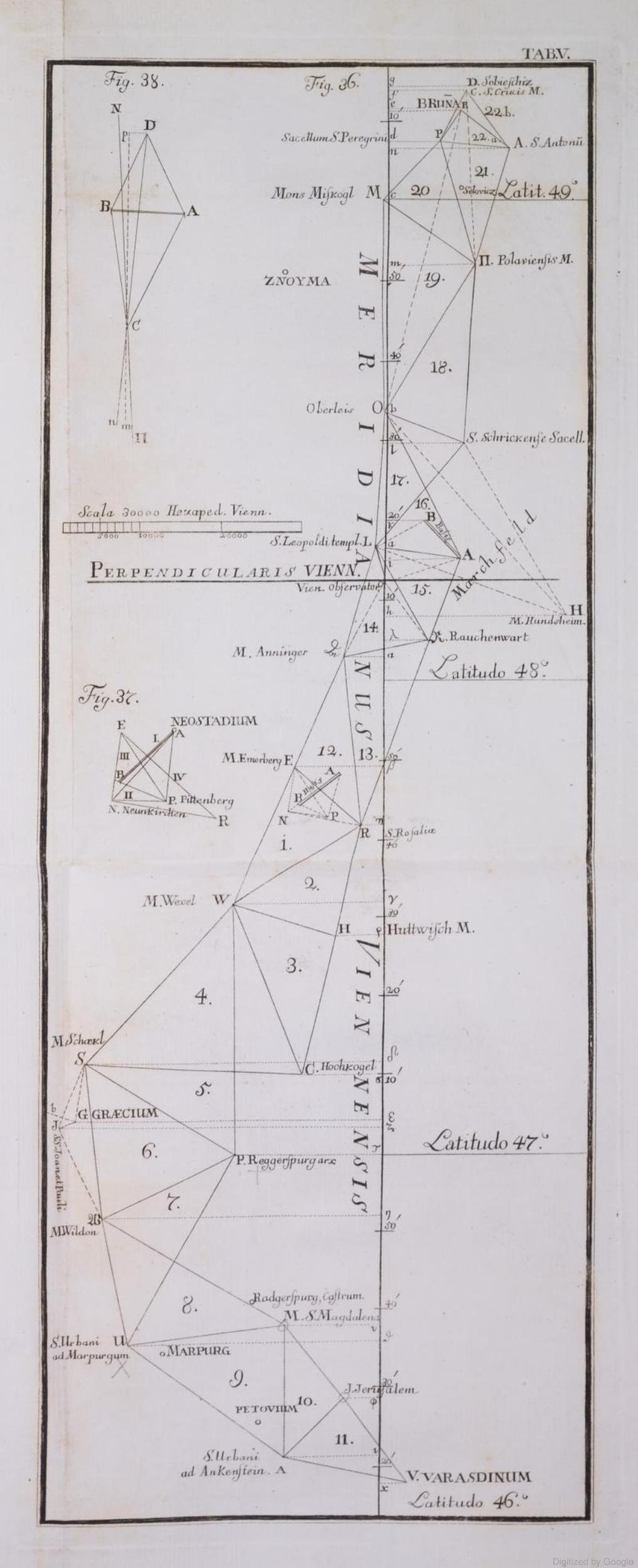
Map fragment

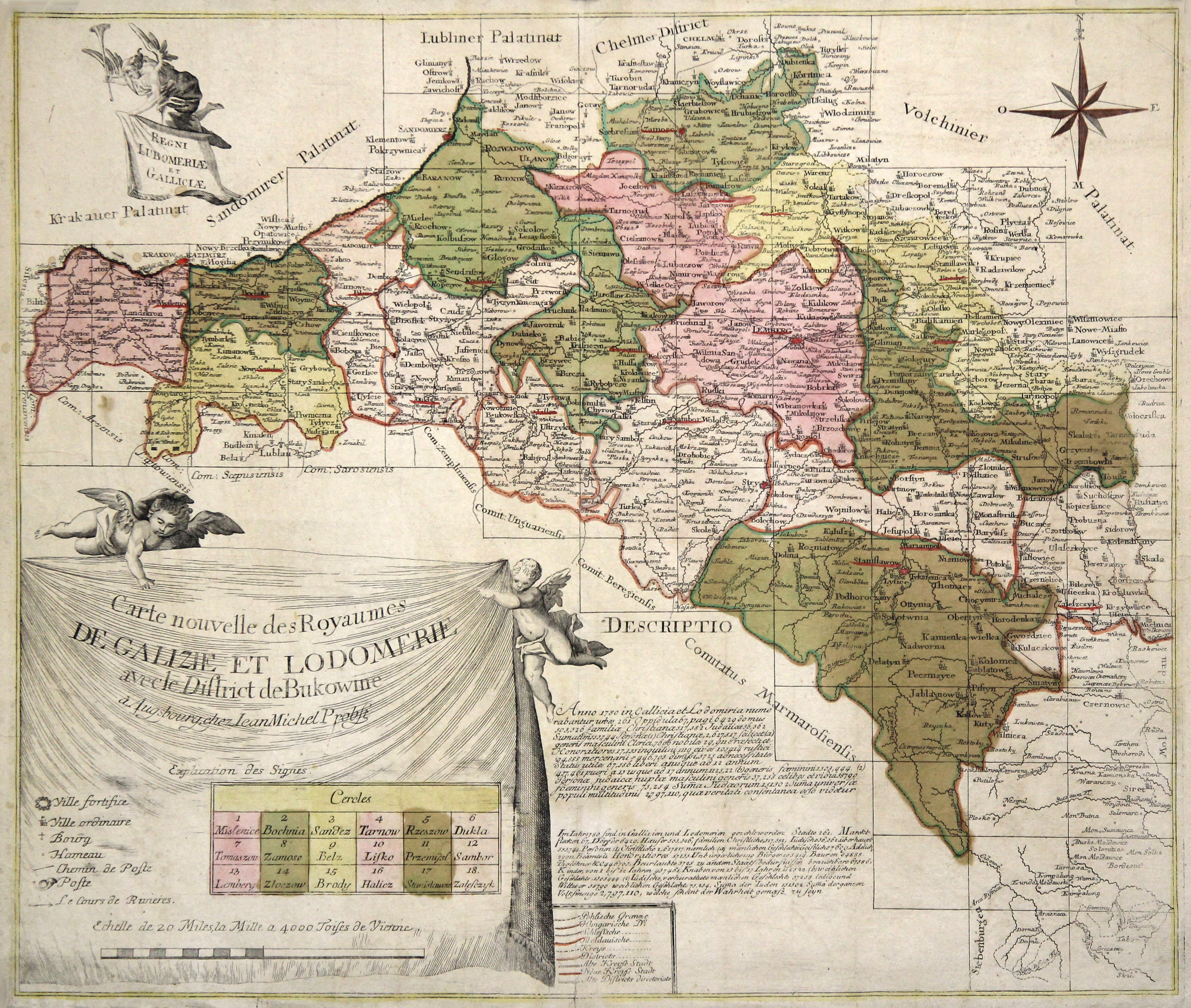
1780 map of Galizia and Lodomeria based on Liesganig's survey
