= Georg Ignaz von Metzburg =

Austrian Jesuit priest, mathematician and cartographer (1735 – 1798)

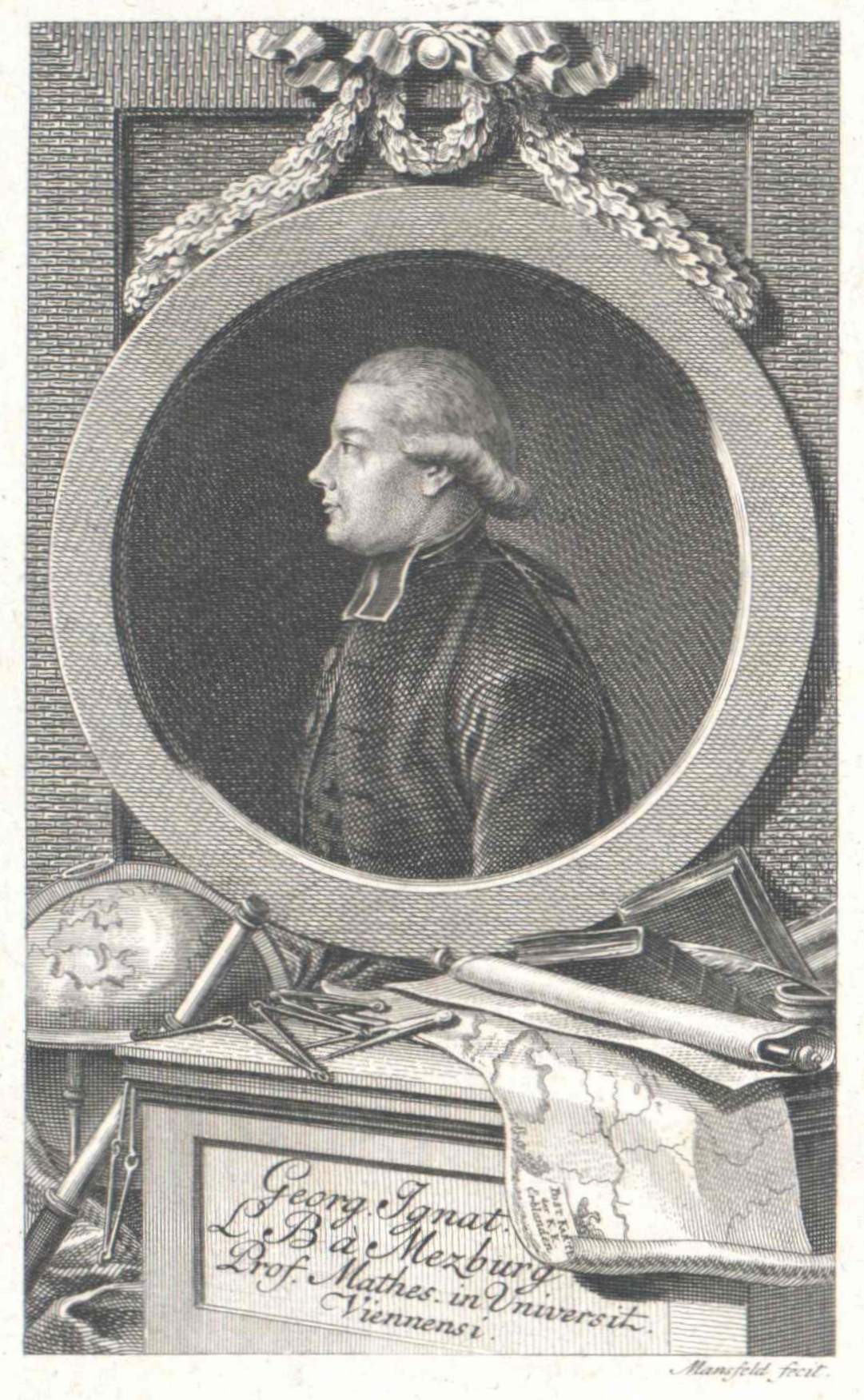

Georg Ignaz von Metzburg (June 24, 1735 – May 3, 1798) was an Austrian Jesuit priest, mathematician and cartographer. He taught mathematics at the University of Vienna.

== Life and work ==
Map of West Galicia, 1799

Von Metzburg was born in Styria in a family from Upper Austria. His father Christoph Augustin Freiherr von Metzburg was a land rights secretary married to Maria Katharina von Hitzelberg. Von Metzburg joined the Society of Jesus in 1751 and was ordained into priesthood in 1764. He became an assistant at the Vienna Observatory. He then received a doctorate in philosophy in 1772. He used his knowledge of geometry and cartography along with Joseph Liesganig to produce a map of Galicia. In 1774 he took up the chair of mathematics at the University of Vienna, succeeding Joseph Walcher. He taught for more than twenty years. Athanasios Psallidas produced a Greek translation of his book on arithmetic. His brother Franz Leopold (November 15, 1746 – October 6, 1789) worked as a consul in Iași, Moldavia and inherited the library of Von Metzburg.

His writings included:

- Helshami Physica experimentalis Newtoniana ex anglico in latinum versa, Vindobonae 1769
- Elementa Arithmeticae regularis seu vulgaris, ibid. 1769 (Vienna 1772, Augsburg 1773)
- Praxis geometrica ex principiis Geometriae deducta, ibid. 1777,
- Institutiones mathematicae. Tomus I–VII, ibid. 1775–1790
- Institutiones mathematicae ad usum tironum, Editio 4, ibid. 1807 (posthumous)
