= Postage stamps and postal history of Antioquia =

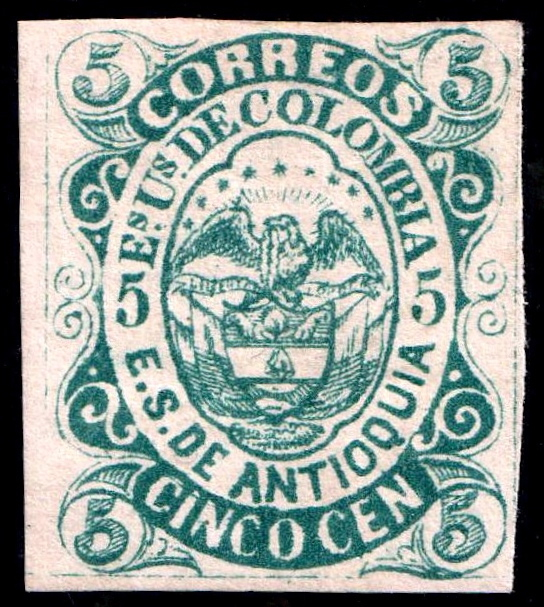
1869, Second issue stamp from Antioquia

Antioquia was one of the states in the original "United States of Colombia", and is now a department in the northwest of the Republic of Colombia. Prior to the constitution of 1886, Antioquia and the other states were sovereign governments in their own right, and even afterwards retained some rights, such as the management of finances.

== Postage stamps ==
Antioquia became a sovereign state in 1858, by recognition as Estado de la Federación in the constitution of the Granadine Confederation. Antioquia issued its first postage stamps on September 1, 1868. A postal exchange agreement with the sovereign state of Bolívar was established a few years later. With the Constitution of 1886, the sovereign state became a department, along with all the other states of Colombia, but they continued with their postal services and stamps until 1906, when the national government took over all the services previously performed by the departments.

The small quantity of stamps issued, the lithographic printing and the variety of papers used make Antioquia a very special and interesting area of Colombian philately. With many stamps no complete sheet exists and with some stamps the largest multiple is only a pair. There was often a very small quantity of stamps printed, only 258 of some and no more than 1,000 of others. Covers of that period are even scarcer than the classic Colombian covers that are recorded.

Only very few hand stamps (postal markings) were used, and most stamps were cancelled in manuscript with the name of the town of origin.

== Stamp gallery ==
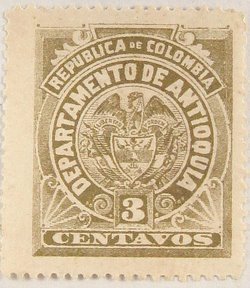

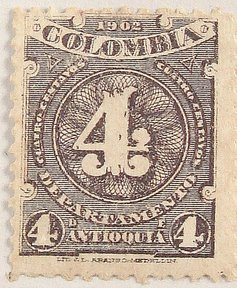

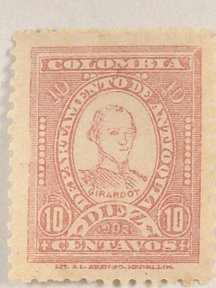

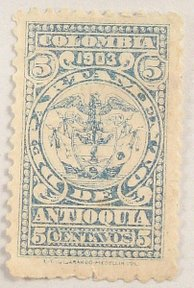

== See also ==
- Postage stamps and postal history of Colombia

== References and sources ==
Notes

Sources

- Stanley Gibbons Ltd: various catalogues
- Encyclopaedia of Postal History
- Rossiter, Stuart & John Flower. The Stamp Atlas. London: Macdonald, 1986. ISBN 0-356-10862-7
