= Dieter Bortfeldt =

Graphic designer and philatelist (1940–2014)

Dieter Bortfeldt, 1940–2014

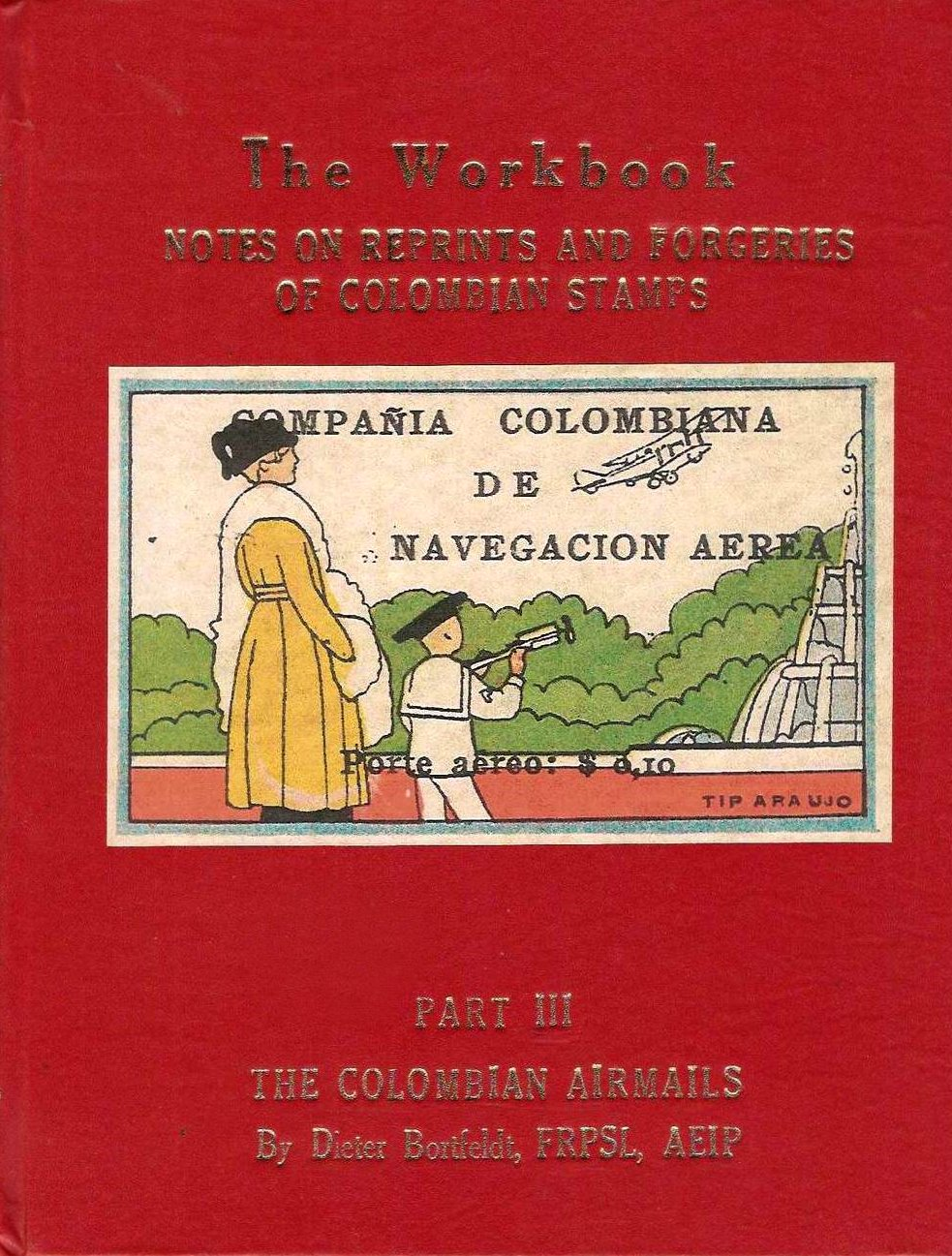
Volume III of Bortfeldt's Workbook

Dieter Bortfeldt FRPSL (20 March 1940 – 21 January 2014) was a graphic designer and award-winning philatelist who was a specialist in the philately of Colombia. He designed the "Famous Colombians" and "Tourism" postage stamps of Colombia issued in 1993.

== Education ==
Bortfeldt studied at the Offenbacher Werkkunst-Schule in Germany from 1958 to 1961, specialising in graphic design. He then worked as a graphic designer.

== Collecting ==
Bortfeldt's personal philatelic interests were Colombian Postal History and Papel Sellado (Revenue stamped paper) and he received fifteen gold medals for his displays along with other awards. His display of Official Mail and correspondence with exemption rate frankings received a gold medal at Chicago and was published in book form by COLOMPHIL in 2006.

== Expertisation ==
Bortfeldt was an Association International Des Experts En Philatelie (A.I.E.P.) expert on Colombian philately and a recognised expertiser in the area who issued his own certificates. He was President of the Fakes and Forgeries Commission of the Federación Interamericana de Filatelia and was a regular contributor to Fakes Forgeries Experts.

== Organised philately and writing ==
Bortfedt was Fellow of the Royal Philatelic Society, London, and their Overseas Special Representative for Colombia. He was the co-founder and editor of COLOMPHIL, the journal of the Colombian Philatelic Research Society, and a writer for many other philatelic journals. He claimed to have written over 2,000 pages of philatelic works and was instrumental in the production of Alan Anyon's Handbook of Colombian Revenue Stamps, published in 2009.

== Personal life ==
Bortfeldt was a British citizen who lived and worked in Germany, London and Barcelona before moving to Bogotá, Colombia, in 1988. He died on 21 January 2014.

== Selected publications ==
- Royal cypher labels 1701–1922: the Dieter Bortfeldt collection. Bogota: Dieter Bortfeldt, 2003.
- Private mail carriers of Colombia. Colombian Philatelic Research Society, 2006. ISBN 978-958-33-9208-5 (Editor with Carlos Valenzuela & Alfredo Frohlich)
- Notes on Colombian classic stamps. Colombian Philatelic Research Society, 2006.
- Colombia correspondencia oficial Franquicias: Official Mail and correspondence with exemption rate frankings. Colombian Philatelic Research Society, 2006.
- Colombian postal history catalogue. Colombian Philatelic Research Society. Three volumes.
