= Postage stamps and postal history of Tolima =

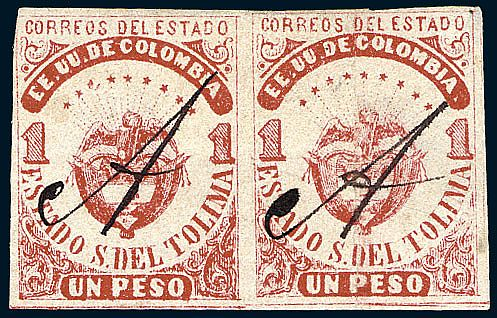
1871 stamps of Tolima

This is a survey of the postage stamps and postal history of Tolima.

Tolima Department is one of the 32 departments of Colombia, located in the Andean region, in the center-west of the country. The department of Tolima was created in 1861 from a part of what had been Cundinamarca.

== First stamps ==
The first postage stamps of Tolima were issued in 1870.

== See also ==
- Postage stamps and postal history of Colombia
