= Revenue stamps of Colombia =

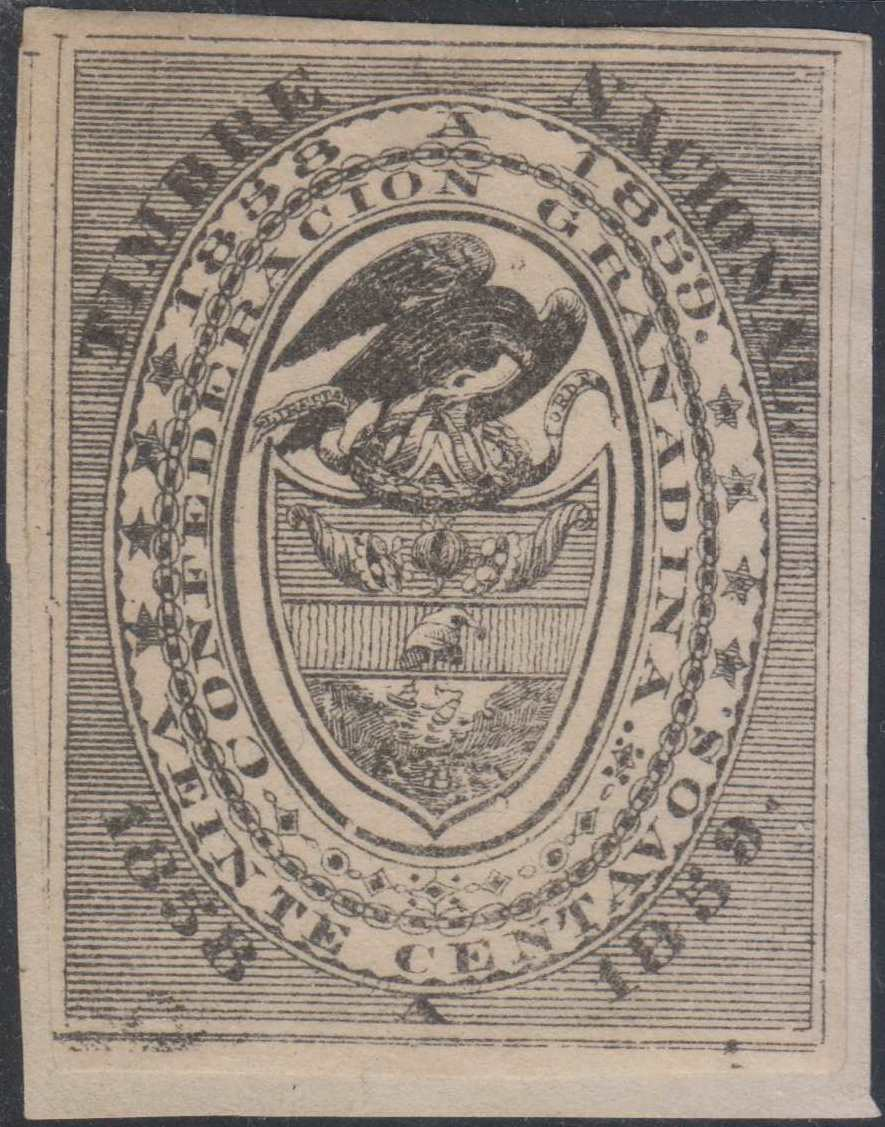
The first revenue stamp of Colombia.

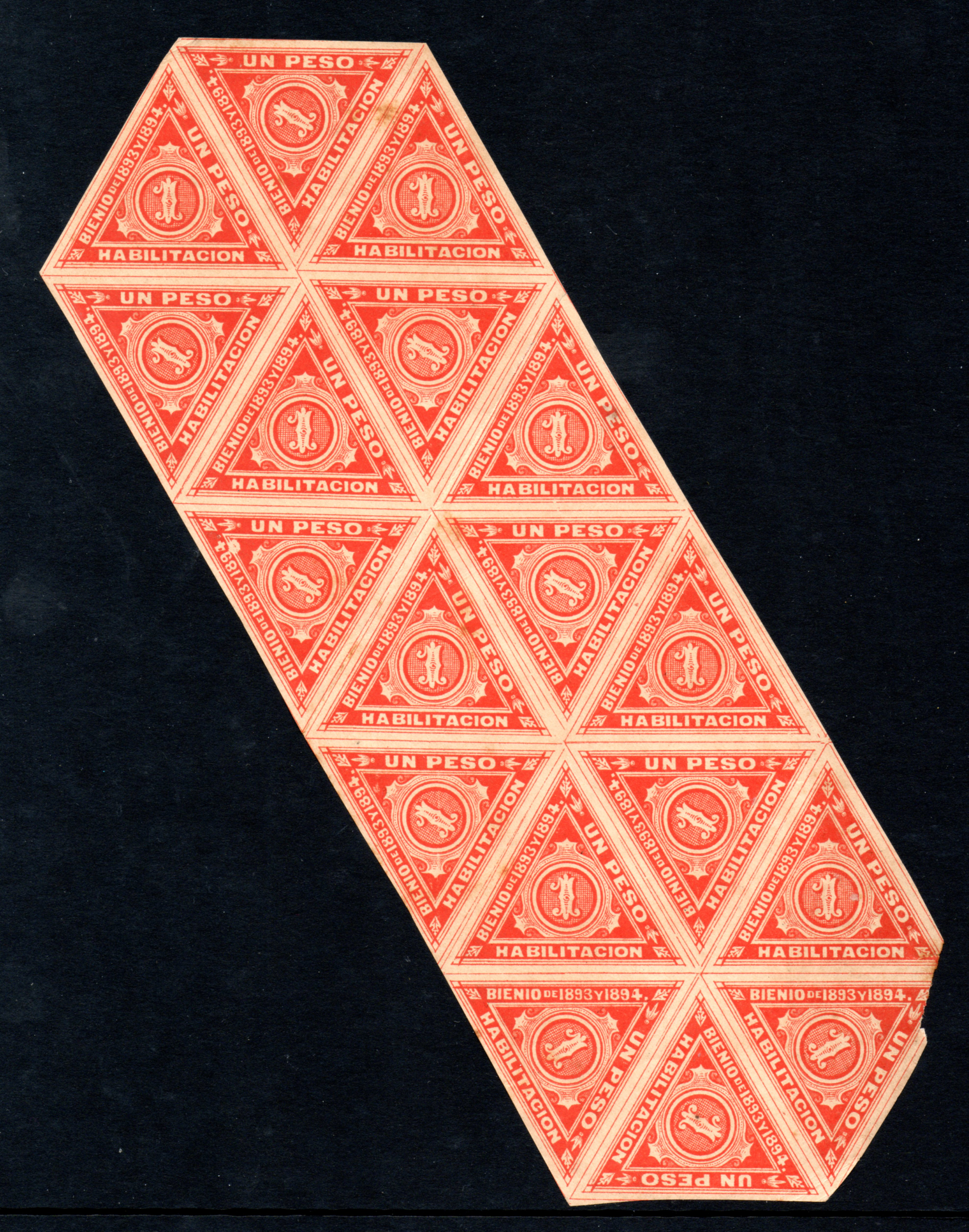
A large block of the triangular Habilitacion 1p stamps of 1893–94.

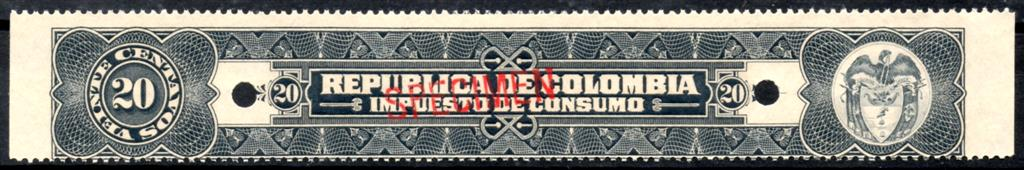
A 1916 revenue stamp of Colombia for sales tax (Impuesto de Consumo).

The first revenue stamp of Colombia was issued on 1 September 1858, one year before the first Colombian postage stamp.

== Granadine Confederation ==
The first Colombian revenue stamp was a black 20 centavos value for the Granadine Confederation.

== United States of New Granada ==
In 1861 a 20c stamp was issued inscribed Estados Unidos de Nueva Granada, or the United States of New Granada.

== United States of Colombia ==
Later in 1861 the United States of New Granada became the United States of Colombia and stamps were issued marked Estados Unidos de Colombia from 1864.

== Republic of Colombia ==
The Republic of Colombia was created in 1886 and revenue stamps marked Republica de Colombia were issued from 1887.

== Colombian states ==
The constituent states of Colombia also issued their own revenue stamps.

== See also ==
- Alan D. Anyon
- Postage stamps and postal history of Colombia
