= Cámara de Comercio de Cúcuta =

Non-profit Colombian government entity

- Location: Cúcuta, Colombia
- Website: https://www.cccucuta.org.co/

The Cámara de Comercio de Cúcuta or Chamber of Commerce of Cúcuta is a non-profit entity of the government of Colombia, attached to the Ministry of Industry, Commerce and Tourism. The jurisdiction is the city of Cúcuta and its Metropolitan Area.

According to the law office the chamber:

- serves as a mediator between the government and traders.
- holds the commercial register.
- collects the commercial taxes of their jurisdiction.
- serves as a mediator when individuals are requested.

== Business mail service ==
The Chamber of Commerce of Cúcuta was founded around the year 1890. The Chamber organized a mail service named Correo del Comercio (Business mail), a service which operated between 1890 and 1915. The mail service was intended to improve the communication between the Santander Provinces and Venezuela and to create faster access to the coast of Maracaibo. Mail was handled between Cúcuta and the golf of Maracaibo in Venezuela, which at the time had a permanent marine communication with Europe and North America. The chamber never issued stamps for this service, only a few registration labels. Stamps of the national postal system were used at the official postage rates cancelled by various types of ”CORREO DEL COMERCIO” handstamps.

== See also ==
- Economy of Cúcuta

== References and sources ==
Sources

- Fuchs, Rainer. Rainer's Colombia Pages: Correo del Comercio Online article
