= Jack Froehlich =

American aerospace engineer

Jack Edward Froehlich (sometimes Froelich) (May 7, 1921 – November 1967) was an American aerospace engineer (rocket scientist).

He worked at the Jet Propulsion Laboratory, where he was a project director for the Explorer 1 program.

Caltech's Jack E. Froehlich Memorial Award is named after him, as is the crater Froelich on the Moon.
