= Tomasz Froelich =

German politician (born 1988)

Tomasz Froelich MEP
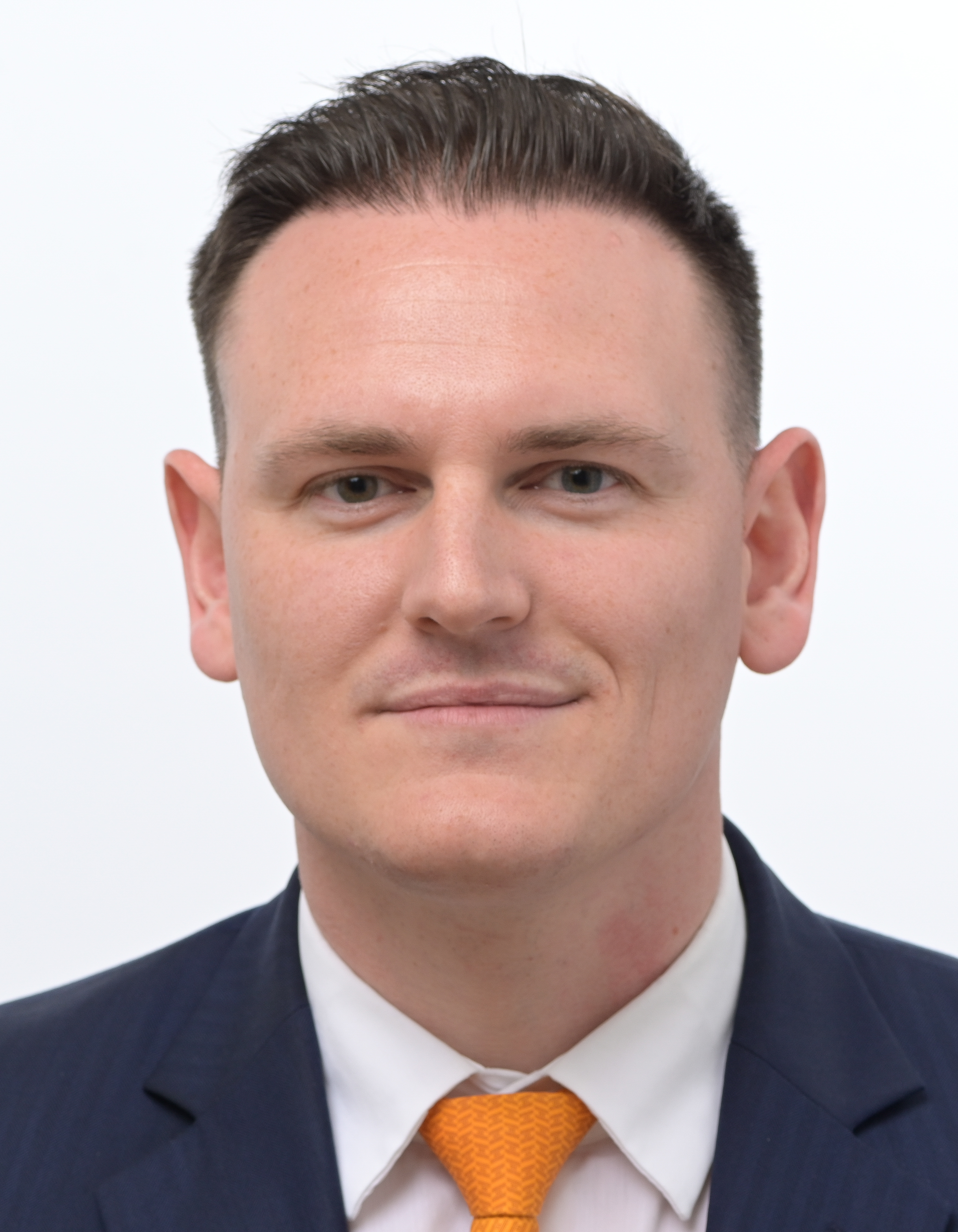
- Froelich in 2024

Member of the European Parliament
- Incumbent
- Assumed office 16 July 2024
- Constituency: Germany

Personal details
- Born: Tomasz Mariusz Froelich; 15 October 1988 (age 37) Hamburg, West Germany
- Party: Alternative for Germany
- Other political affiliations: Europe of Sovereign Nations
- Relatives: Adolf Froelich (great-grandfather)
- Education: University of Vienna

Tomasz Mariusz Froelich (born 15 October 1988) is a German politician of Alternative for Germany (AfD) who was elected a member of the European Parliament (MEP) in 2024. He has also served as vice chair of the Young Alternative since 2019.

== Education ==
Froelich was born in Hamburg and spent his childhood there and in Szczecin. He graduated from the Wilhelm-Gymnasium in Hamburg in 2008. He then studied political science and international development at the University of Vienna and socioeconomics at the Vienna University of Economics and Business. During and after his studies, he was a research assistant at Martin Rhonheimer's Austrian Institute of Economics & Social Philosophy.

== Political career ==
As a teenager, Froelich was a member of the Young Liberals. During his studies, Froelich ran the right-wing libertarian blog Freitum, which received the Roland Baader Award in 2012. He published for media that are classified as right-wing populist and libertarian, including eigentümlich frei, Freilich, Krautzone, Junge Freiheit, Blaue Narzisse and Schweizerzeit. After completing his studies, he initially worked as a parliamentary advisor to the AfD parliamentary group in the Baden-Württemberg state parliament from June 2016. After a short time, he became office manager for the then AfD party leader Jörg Meuthen. In 2019, he became press spokesperson for the AfD delegation in the European Parliament. Froelich has been deputy federal chairman of the Young Alternative for Germany since February 2019. From 2019 to 2021, he was state chairman of the Young Alternative for Hamburg. In 2022, he became parliamentary advisor to the Identity and Democracy parliamentary group. In July 2023, Froelich was elected to 12th place on the list for the 2024 European elections at the AfD national party conference in Magdeburg. He entered the European Parliament in 2024 via this list position. There, he is a member of the Committee on Human Rights (DROI) and a substitute member of the Committee on Foreign Affairs (AFET) and the Committee on Development (DEVE).

== Trivia and personal life ==
Froelich played football for VfL 93 Hamburg in the then fourth-tier Oberliga Nord and was nominated for the Polish U18 national team together with Robert Lewandowski in 2006.

He is married.

The Polish inventor Adolf Froelich is his great-grandfather.

== Awards and honours ==
- 2012: Roland Baader Award
