= Alan D. Anyon =

British philatelist and expert (1931–2025)

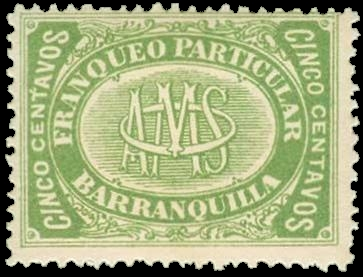
An 1882 stamp of the Barranquilla private post of Octavio Mora, about which Anyon wrote.

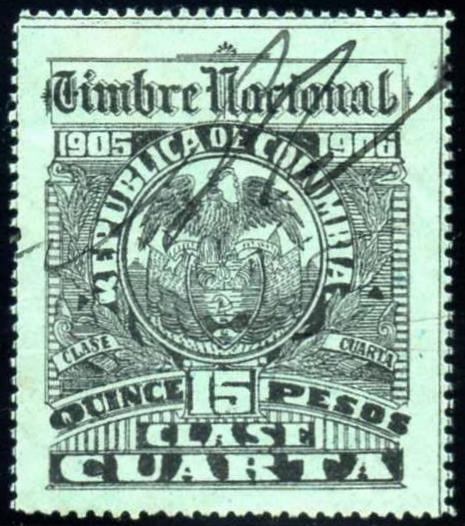
A 1905-06 revenue stamp of Colombia.

Alan Derek Anyon (1931 – 14 November 2025) was a British philatelist and expert in the revenue stamps of Colombia. In 2009, with Dieter Bortfeldt, he published the first dedicated catalogue of Colombian revenue stamps.

== Background ==
Alan Derek Anyon was born in London in 1931. He died on 14 November 2025, aged 94.

== Philately ==
Anyon was a Fellow of The Royal Philatelic Society London from 2009. Apart from The Royal, Anyon was a member of several other philatelic societies including the Revenue Society, the Cinderella Stamp Club, and the Colombia-Panama Philatelic Study Group (COPAPHIL). His displays of provisional and revenue stamps of Colombia have received eight gold medals worldwide and he wrote over 70 articles on those subjects.

== Outside philately ==
Anyon was a medical and chemical sales manager and served on the governing Council of the Royal Society for the Prevention of Cruelty to Animals (RSPCA) from 1995 until 2008. He was Deputy Treasurer of that society on two occasions. Anyon was a member of his local branch of the RSPCA for almost 50 years.

== Selected publications ==
- Handbook of Colombian Revenue Stamps. Bogota, Colombia: COLOMPHIL, Colombian Philatelic Research Society, 2009. ISBN 978-958-44-5092-0
- A different look at Colombia. Display given to The Royal Philatelic Society London 27 May 2010. London: The Royal Philatelic Society London, 2010. (With Dieter Bortfeldt)
- "Colombia: The Postmaster's Provisional Issues." in The Cinderella Philatelist, Cinderella Stamp Club, Vol. 51, No. 2, April 2011, pp. 54–58. (Corrections in Vol. 51, No. 3, p. 118.)

== See also ==
- Revenue stamps of Colombia
