= Karl Scherffer =

Austrian Jesuit mathematician and natural scientist

Karl Scherffer (9 November 1716 – 24 July 1783) was an Austrian Jesuit mathematician and natural scientist. He contributed works in mathematics, optics and astronomy. He promoted the mathematical works of Leonhard Euler and the natural philosophy of Roger Joseph Boscovich.

Scherffer was born in Gmunden and studied at the Steyr Gymnasium. He joined the Jesuit order in 1736 and studied philosophy at Graz. He then taught humanities in Krems. He studied mathematics from Erasmus Fröhlich in Vienna around 1740–41. He went to the University of Graz around 1748 and graduated in philosophy. He taught mathematics at Graz and was also involved in work at the Graz Observatory. In 1750 he became a faculty of philosophy at the University of Vienna and taught teachers for Jesuit schools. In 1757 Roger Boscovich was in Vienna dealing with a border dispute between Lucca and Tuscany. He spent time with Scherffer and left him a manuscript of Philosophiae naturalis theoria. Scherffer sent several comments to Boscovich. Scherffer and Boscovich also communicated on matters of astronomical angular measurement and improvements to telescopes. After the abolition of the Jesuit order in 1773 he became a professor of mathematics at Vienna and worked there until his death. He taught Newtonian ideas in physics.

Scherffer believed that the eye sensed light through perception of vibrations caused by light in the retina.
