= Alfredo Frohlich =

American philatelist

Alfredo Frohlich FRPSL
- Born: Bogotá, Colombia
- Occupations: Financial advisor and venture capitalist
- Known for: Charity fund-raising; Philatelic collections of Central and South America

Alfredo Frohlich FRPSL is an American venture capitalist and philatelist who has won numerous medals at philatelic exhibitions for his postal history collections of Chile, Colombia, Ecuador, and Panama. He is an accredited philatelic judge and has been a fellow of the Royal Philatelic Society London since 2010. In 2021 he received the Luff Award of the American Philatelic Society.

His interest in psychiatry led him to join the external advisory board of the University of Miami Department of Psychiatry and Behavioral Sciences for which he has run fund-raising events. He has also raised funds with his wife for a school for the autistic.

== Early life and family ==
Alfredo Frohlich was born in Bogotá, Colombia. He is married to Andrea and together they live in an Aventura, Florida, condominium whose design was profiled in Luxe Interiors + Design magazine in 2019.

== Career and fund-raising ==
Frohlich moved to Miami in the late 1990s where he worked as a financial adviser and venture capitalist. He became a naturalized American citizen in 2007.

He has a long-standing interest in psychiatry and is a member of the external advisory board of the University of Miami Department of Psychiatry and Behavioral Sciences where he has raised funds and taken a particular interest in depression, anxiety, and suicide prevention. He is also interested in autism and with his wife has raised funds for The Victory Center for Autism and Related Disabilities, and for Jewish causes.

== Collecting ==
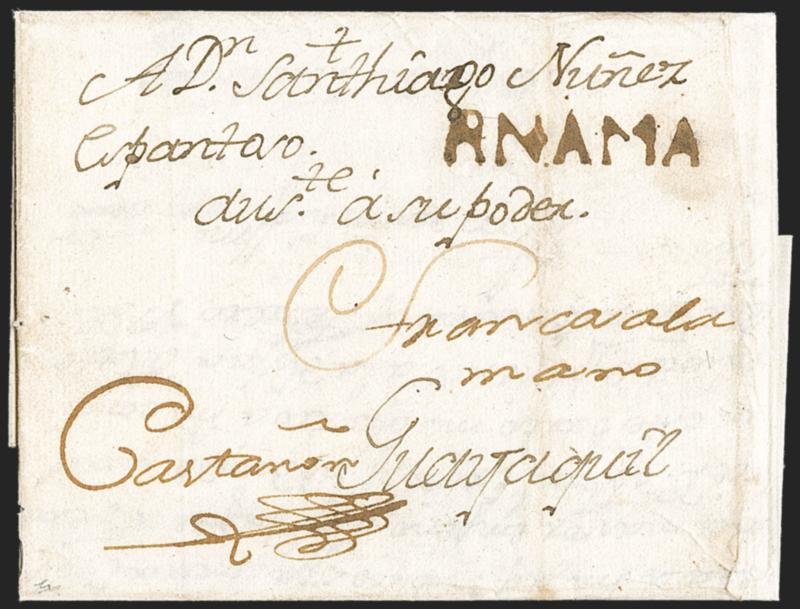
Folded letter datelined February 19, 1777, from Panama to Guayaquil, Ecuador, formerly in the Frohlich collection.

Frohlich's philatelic collections have focused on Central and South America. He has assembled award-winning collections of Colombia (confederation and federal governments), Chile, and the SCADTA issues of Ecuador. His collection of Colombia won the Champion of Champions award in 2007.

Auctioneer Charles F. Shreve has described Frohlich's greatest philatelic achievement as his collection of the evolution of the postal systems in Panama from 1777 to 1881 which won three large gold medals at Fédération Internationale de Philatélie endorsed philatelic exhibitions: Korea 2014, New York 2016, and Taipei 2016. The collection included an 1839 letter to General Tomás Cipriano de Mosquera, the future president of Colombia, that is also the earliest surviving registered letter from Panama. The collection was sold at auction by Siegel International in 2018. Frohlich has also formed a collection of the postal history of Delaware from 1773 to 1847 which was shown before the Collectors Club of New York in 2021.

He has been an accredited philatelic judge since 2008 and a fellow of the Royal Philatelic Society London since 2010. He is a former member of the National Postal Museum's Council of Philatelists. In 2021 he received the Luff Award of the American Philatelic Society.

== Selected publications ==
- The Lansa Story. Colombian Philatelic Research Society, 2005. (With Dieter Bortfeldt) ISBN 958-33-9206-5
- Private Mail Carriers of Colombia. Colombian Philatelic Research Society, 2006. (With Dieter Bortfeldt and Carlos Valenzuela) ISBN 958-33-9208-1
- 150 Years of Colombian Philately. Alfredo Frohlich, 2009.
