= Froelich (crater) =

Lunar impact crater

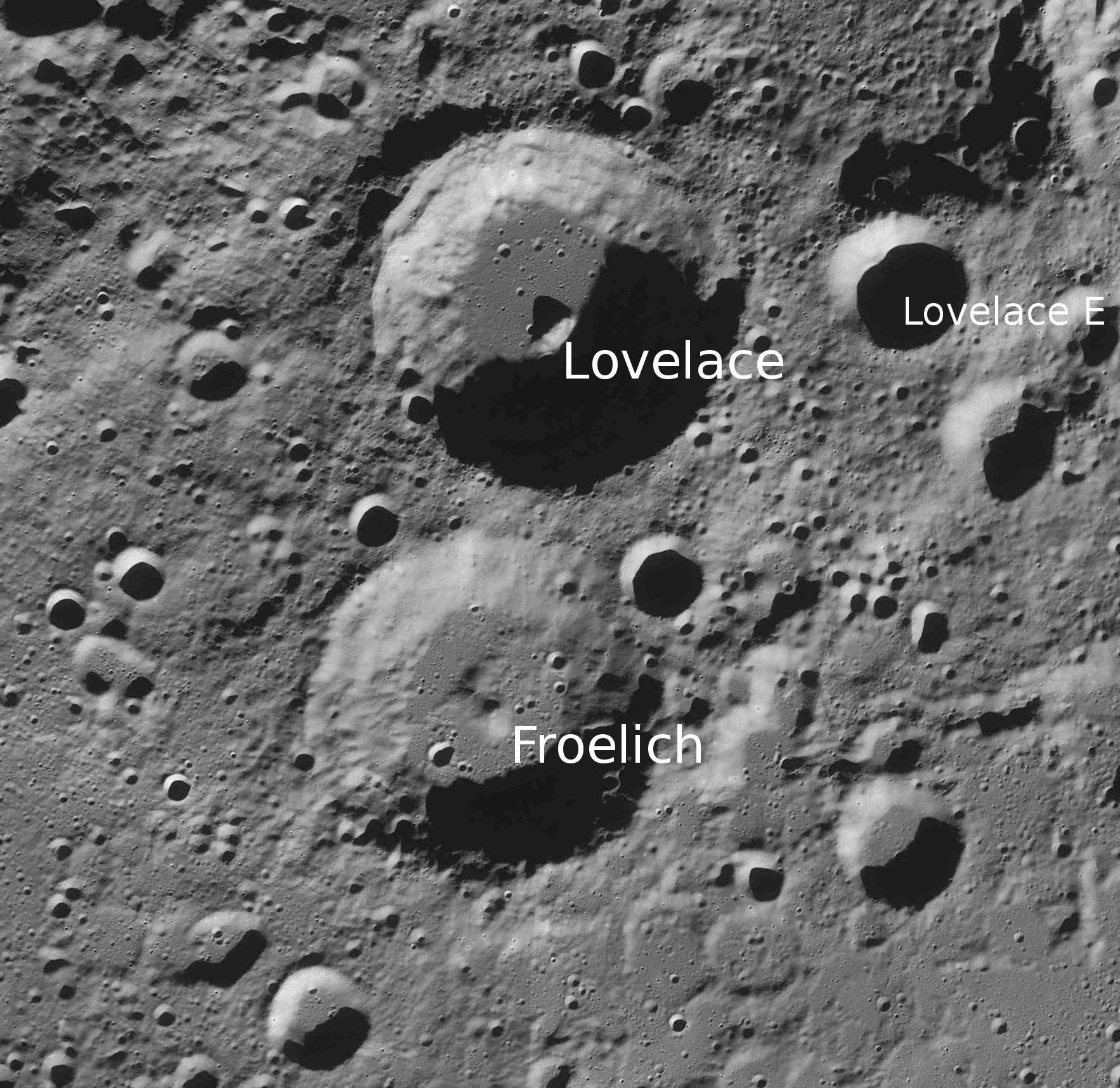
- Moon craters Froelich (below) and Lovelace (above) (north at top)
- Coordinates: 80.3°N 109.7°W
- Diameter: 56.73 km (35.25 mi)
- Depth: 3.18 km (1.98 mi)
- Colongitude: 115° at sunrise
- Formation: Nectarian
- Eponym: Jack E. Froehlich

Froelich is a lunar impact crater on the far side of the Moon. It is located in the northern regions, just beyond the north-northwestern limb. Only a few kilometers separate this formation from the crater Lovelace to the north. Farther to the south is the crater Merrill, and to the southeast along the limb is the larger Brianchon.

This crater dates to the Nectarian period of the lunar geologic timescale. It has a circular, symmetrical shape but the rim is worn and does not project very far above the surface. There is a groove in the western wall running perpendicular to the rim. The inner walls are generally featureless, except for small craterlets along the eastern and southern sides. The interior floor has a low ridge in the northeastern quadrant and a small central rise.

This formation is named after American rocket scientist Jack Edward Froehlich (1921-1967). Its designation was officially adopted by the International Astronomical Union in 1970.

== Satellite craters ==
By convention these features are identified on lunar maps by placing the letter on the side of the crater midpoint that is closest to Froelich.

Froelich	Latitude	Longitude	Diameter
M	77.6° N	109.3° W	29 km
