= Erasmus Fröhlich =

Austrian historian and numismatist

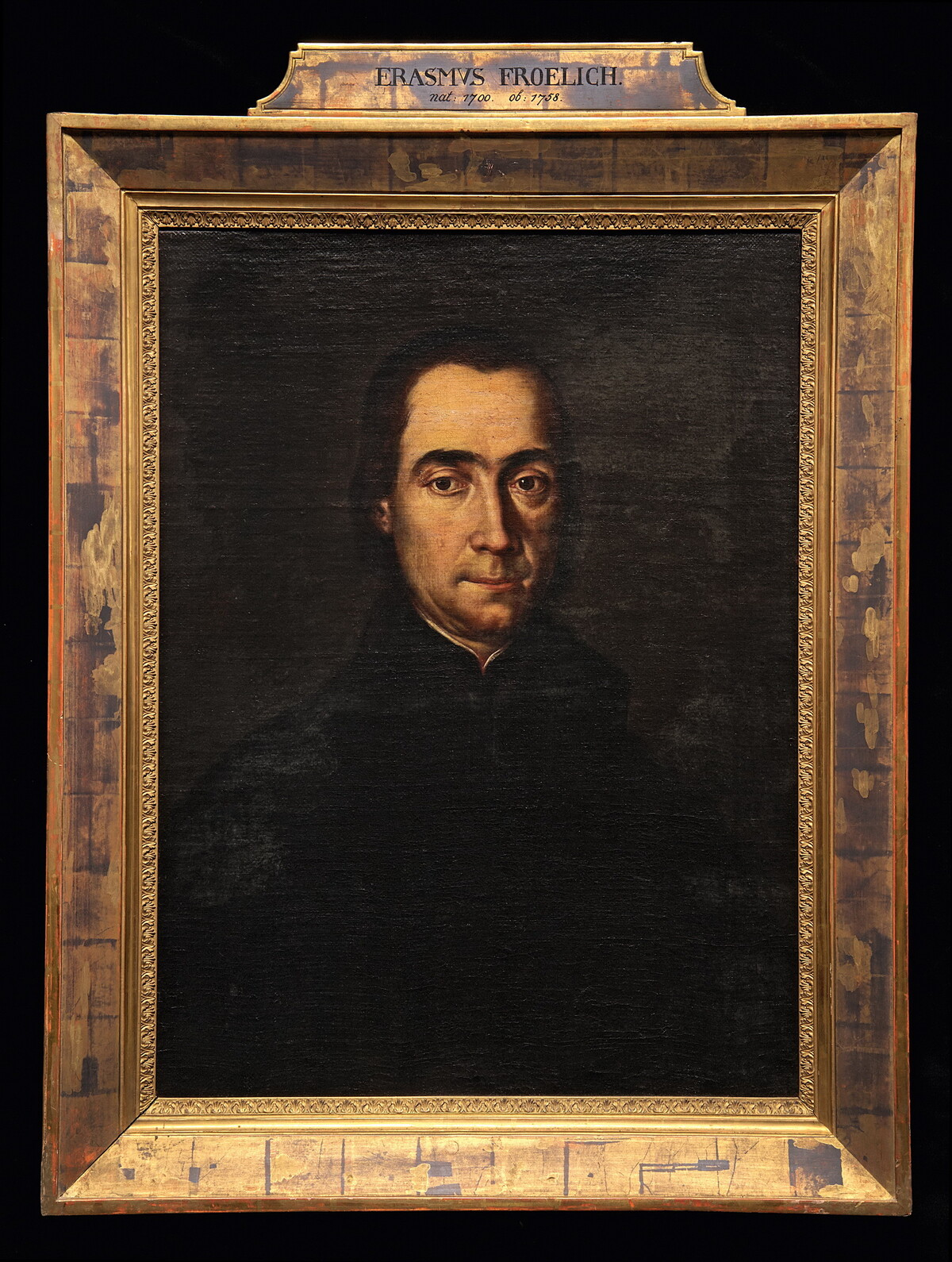
Painting by Peter Fendi

Erasmus Fröhlich (2 October 1700 – 7 July 1758) was an Austrian Jesuit mathematics teacher and numismatist. He also took an interest in history and astronomy. As a teacher at the Theresianum, he influenced a number of studies in the region in history, mathematics, and astronomy. He also served as the librarian at the Theresianum.

== Life and work ==
Fröhlich was born in Graz and joined the Jesuit order at sixteen. After studies in Graz and Vienna he taught mathematics at Klagenfurt and Vienna. His mathematics students included Karl Scherffer and He also began to collect coins and study them. This interest was inspired by Father Christian Edschlager who had worked in Turkey and Greece and Father Karl Granelli. He wrote on coinage between 1733 and 1737 in Quatuor tentamina in re nummaria vetere and related works. In 1744 he wrote on coinage related to the time of Seleucus I Nicator Annales compendiarii regum et rerum Syriae (1744). This work included some historic and theological views which were disputed by Leipzig scholar Gottlieb Wernsdorf. His work attracted the attention of Empress Maria Theresia who appointed him teacher of history, archaeology and Greek at the Theresianum. His students included Count Coronini who wrote on the history of Gorizia and Istria and Georg Pray who wrote on Hungary. He collaborated with Maximilianus Hell (1720–1792) on astronomy and on optics with Louis Bertrand Castel. Other correspondents included Joseph Khell who succeeded him at the Theresianum and the astronomer Christian Rieger (1714–1780).
