= Joseph Walcher =

Austrian Jesuit, matheatician and physicist (1719–1803)

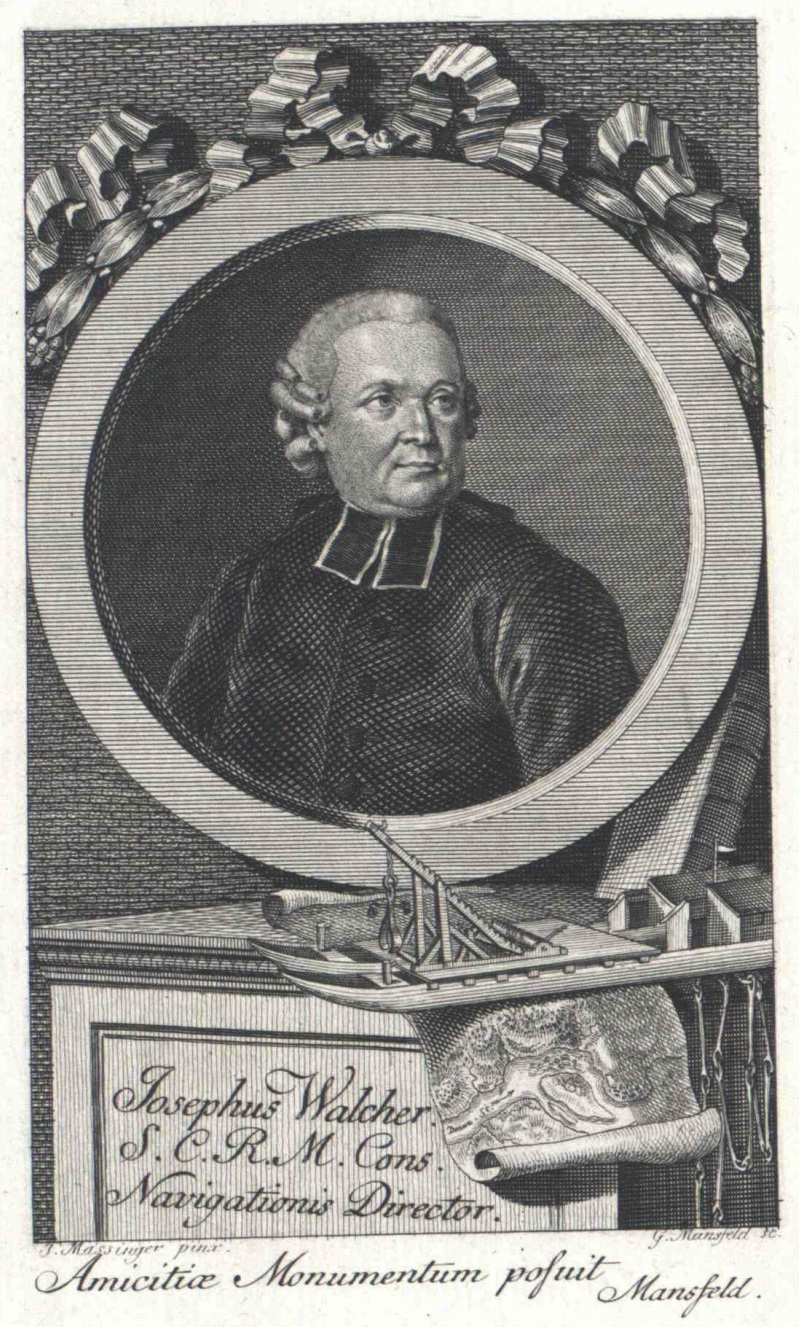

Joseph Walcher (8 January 1719 – 29 November 1803) was an Austrian Jesuit mathematician and physicist. He was involved in management and engineering of structures on the Danube river to enhance navigability and aid shipping. He also studied the glaciers of the Tyrol that fed the rivers of Austria.

== Early life and education ==
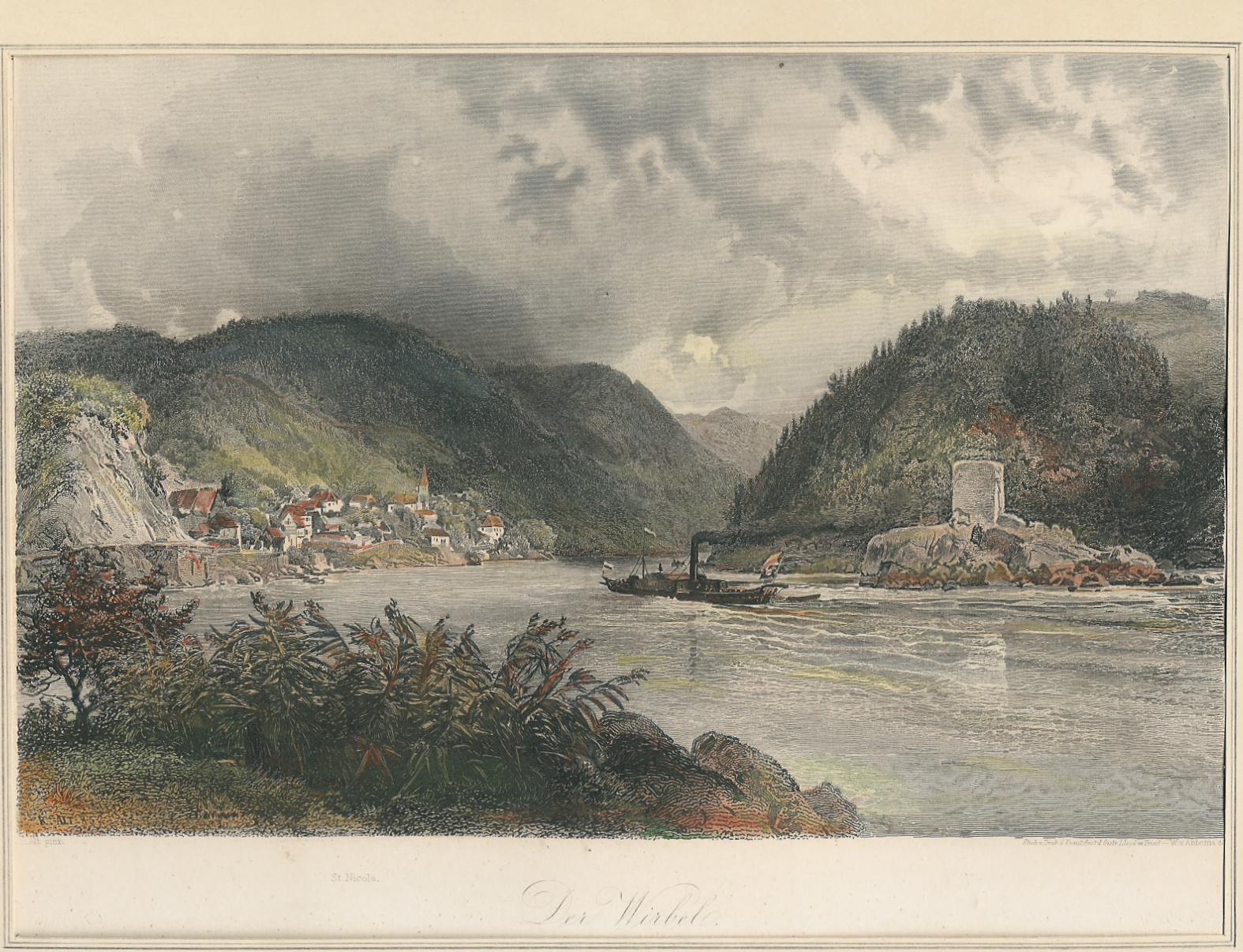
A picture of the famous eddy in the Danube. The island of Hausstein was eventually blown up in 1853.

Walcher was born in Linz and joined the Society of Jesus in 1737. After studying theology and mathematics, he became particularly interested in mechanics and hydraulics.

== Career ==
He was ordained priest in 1748. He taught Hebrew at Graz and then studied mathematics and physics in Vienna and Linz.

From 1756 to 1773 he taught mechanics at the Theresian Academy in Vienna. After the abolition of the Jesuit order in 1773, he was put in charge of navigation on the Danube by Maria Theresa because of his expertise in hydraulics. He helped direct improvements in shipping and navigation based on the management of the Rhine.

Under his direction several whirlpools in the Strudel rapids and dangerous rocky sections of the Wolfskügel and the Meisenkügel were cleared up. In 1771 he went to study the glaciers in the Oetzthal Alps which had threatened to break and cause damage. He published Nachrichten von den Eisbergen in Tyrol in 1773. In 1783 he designed a canal between the Vltava and the Danube by diverting the Rodl. The canal would start from the Moldau at Hohenfurth through the Haselgraben and reach Linz. This plan, however, was never realized.

== Later life, death, and legacy ==
In 1797 he was in charge of the mechanical museum of the Theresian Academy. His 50 years of priesthood was celebrated in Vienna in 1798. He became director of mathematics and physical sciences at the University of Vienna in 1802. The Walcherstraße in Vienna was named after him in 1897.
