= Adolf Froelich =

Polish inventor, dentist and participant in the Polish-Soviet War

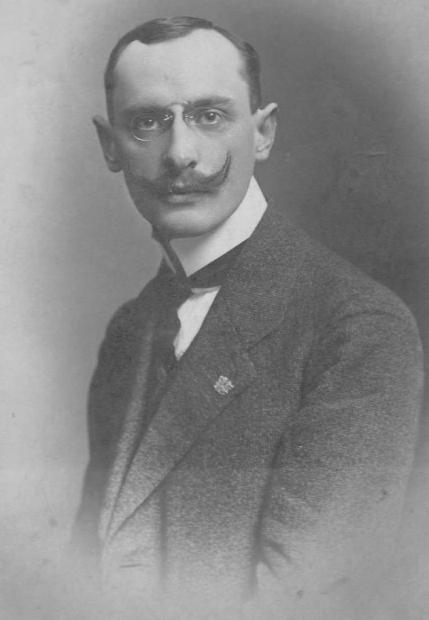
- Portrait of Froelich, c. 1912
- Born: 24 December 1887; Łaziska, Lublin Governorate, Congress Poland
- Died: 1943; Warsaw, General Government
- Education: TH München
- Relatives: Tomasz Froelich
- Military career
- Allegiance: Second Polish Republic
- Branch: Polish Armed Forces
- Rank: Podporuchnik
- Division: 9th Infantry
- Conflict: Polish–Soviet War

Adolf Froelich (December 24, 1887 – November 1943) was a Polish inventor, dentist and participant in the Polish-Soviet War.

== Curriculum vitae ==
Adolf Froelich was born in Łaziska, Congress Poland, to parents Reinhold Froelich and Antonina Wilhelmina Józefina Froelich (née Majewska). He studied brewing technology at the Royal Bavarian Academy for Agriculture and Beer Brewing, a department of TH München, based in Freising. Furthermore, he studied dentistry. He attained his dentist's approbation in 1918. As a dentist he worked inter alia in Jędrzejów. In 1932 he invented the twin propeller. He was an officer (rank; podporuchnik) of the Polish Armed Forces. As a dentist he took part in the Polish-Soviet War being a member of the 9th Infantry Division. He died in Warsaw.

=== Bibliography ===
- Urząd Patentowy Rzeczpospolitej Polskiej Opis Patentowy Nr 18229, Warszawa 21 sierpnia 1933, Adolf Froelich, Podwójne śmigło.
