= Postage stamps and postal history of Chad =

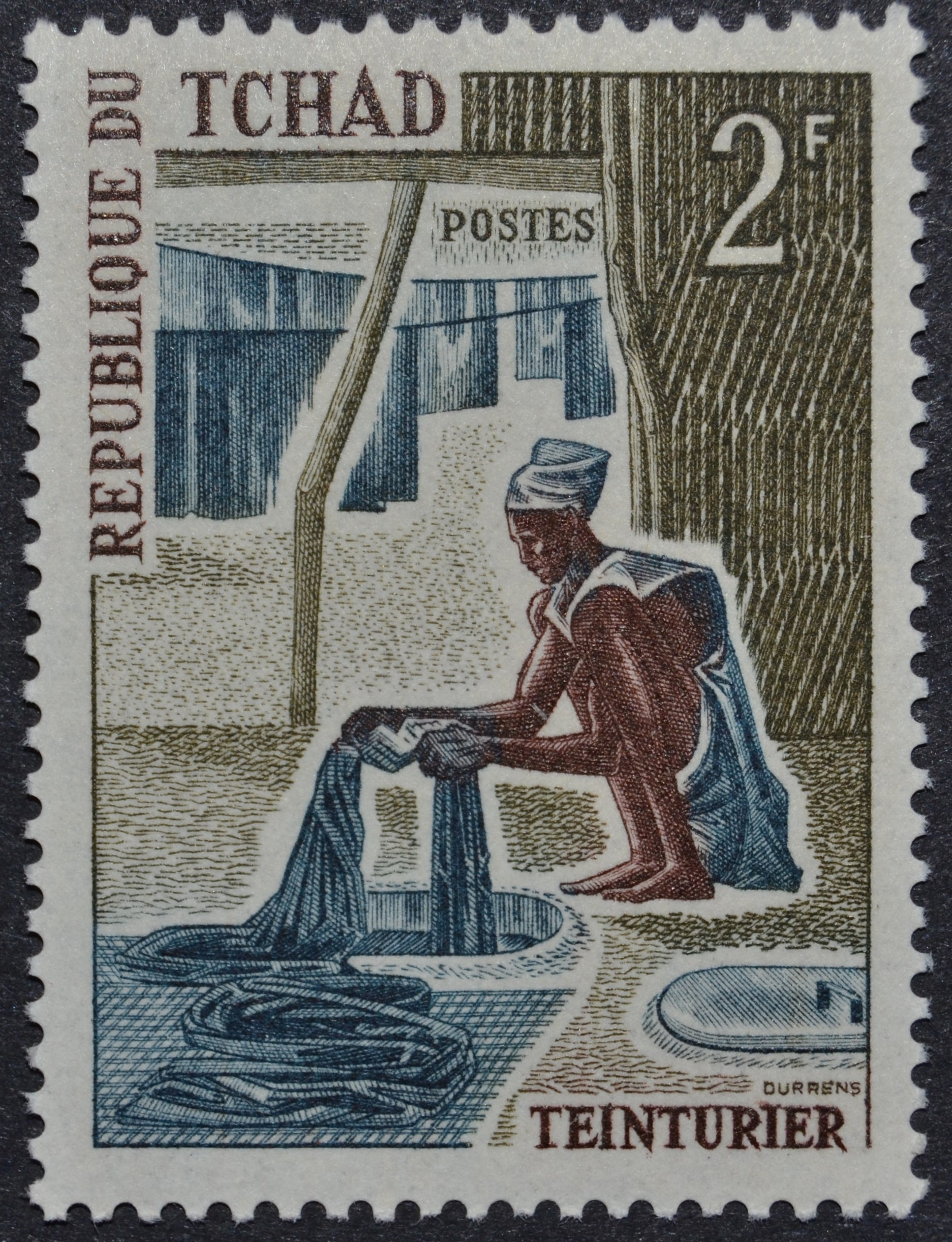
A 1970 stamp of Chad

This is a survey of the postage stamps and postal history of Chad.

Chad is a landlocked country in central Africa bordered by Libya to the north, Sudan to the east, the Central African Republic to the south, Cameroon and Nigeria to the southwest, and Niger to the west. Chad is divided into three major geographical regions: a desert zone in the north, an arid Sahelian belt in the centre and a more fertile Sudanese savanna zone in the south.

== First mails ==
Regular mail service in Chad began soon after the French occupation of the area, with a post office established at Fort-Lamy in 1905. Additional offices were opened at Abeche (1909), Amm et Timan (1910), Ati (1909), Bousso (1910), Fada (1920), Faya-Largeau (1920), Mandjafa (1910), and Tchekna (1910).

Mail used stamps of French Congo until 1915, then stamps of Ubangi Shari, whose overprints read "OUBANGUI-CHARI-TCHAD".

== Overprints ==
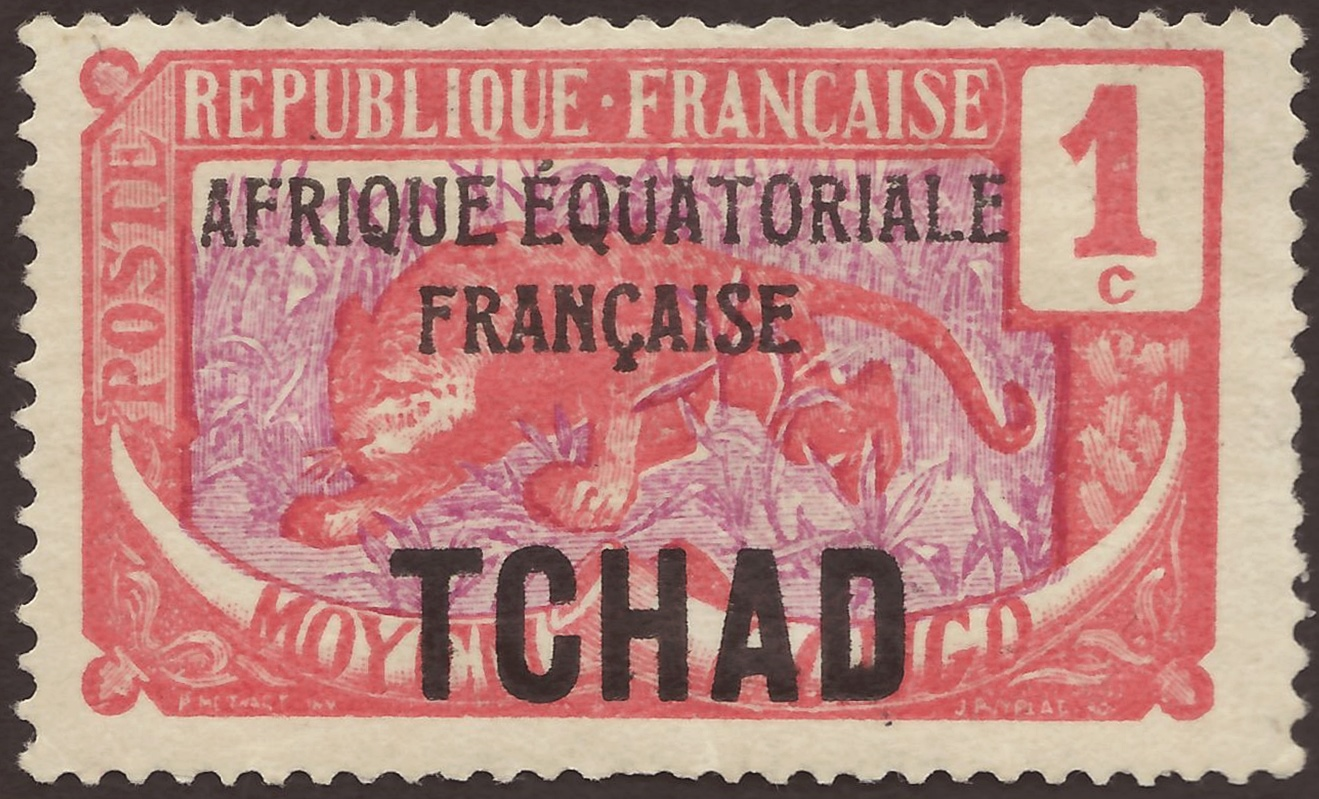
A French colonial stamp overprinted for use in Chad

Chad came under civil administration in 1920, and in 1922 received its own stamps, consisting of the issues of Middle Congo overprinted "TCHAD". The initial issue consisted of 18 values ranging from 1 centime to 5 francs. As with Oubangui-Chari, the administrative situation was clarified from 1924 on by the addition of an additional overprint "AFRIQUE EQUATORIALE FRANCAISE". 32 color and value combinations appeared between 1924 and 1933, along with another 9 surcharged with new values.

== 1930s ==
In 1930, a set of colorful postage due stamps were the first to be inscribed with the name of the colony, followed by the Colonial Exposition Issue in 1931.

Separate stamps issues came to an end in 1936, after which Chad used the stamps issued for all of French Equatorial Africa.

== Independent Chad ==
A 1972 stamp of Chad

In 1959, approaching independence, the country issued its first stamps omitting the letters RF (standing for "République française", French Republic). These included a 15-franc issue depicting a cotton flower, fishermen on Lake Chad and the head of an antelope.

Independence in 1960 was not reflected in postage stamps until 1961, when three stamps were issued to celebrate admission to the UN.

== See also ==
- Postage stamps and postal history of Ubangi-Shari
- Postage stamps of French Equatorial Africa

== Sources ==
- Stanley Gibbons Ltd: various catalogues
- Encyclopaedia of Postal Authorities
- Rossiter, Stuart & John Flower. The Stamp Atlas. London: Macdonald, 1986. ISBN 0-356-10862-7
