= Postage stamps and postal history of the Republic of the Congo =

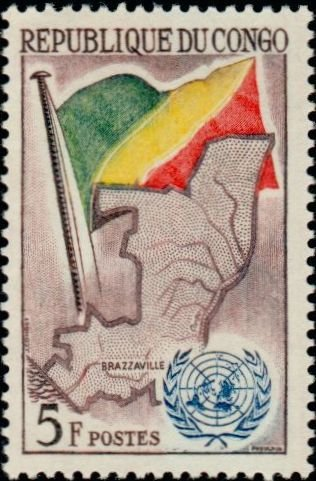
A 1961 stamp of the Republic of the Congo

This is a survey of the postage stamps and postal history of the Republic of the Congo, a former French colony known as Middle Congo or French Congo, and now often known simply as The Congo.

The Republic of the Congo is a country in central Africa bordered by Gabon, Cameroon, the Central African Republic, the Democratic Republic of the Congo (formerly known as Zaire), the Angolan exclave province of Cabinda, and the Gulf of Guinea.

== French Congo ==
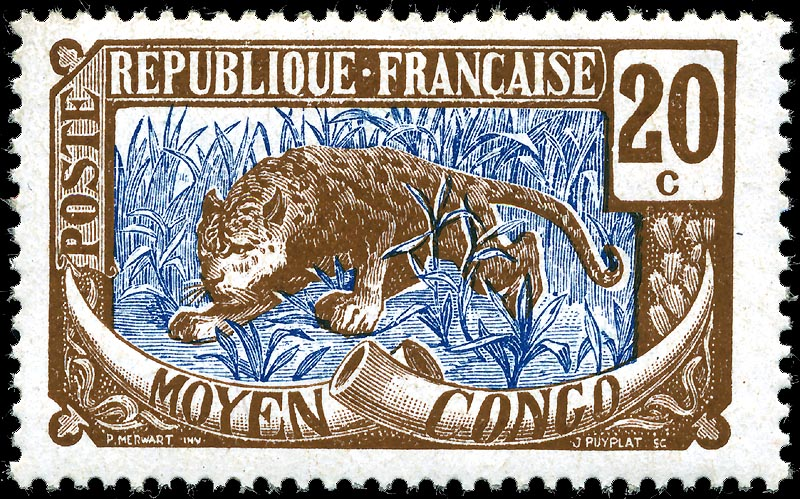
A 1907 stamp of Middle Congo

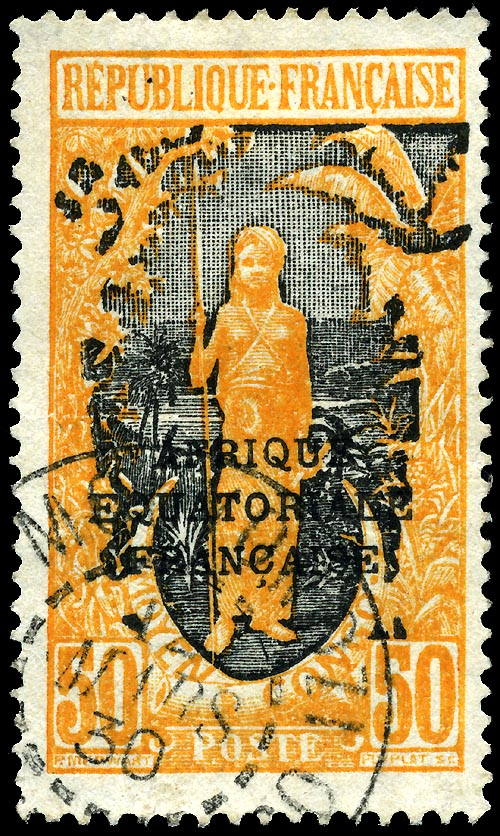
A stamp of Middle Congo overprinted "Afrique Equatoriale Française" in 1925

The first stamps used in the area were those of French Congo in 1891. The stamps of French Congo were also used in Gabon, and later in Ubangi-Shari in 1893. From 1907, stamps were inscribed "Moyen Congo" (Middle Congo) which were used in Ubangi-Shari and Chad as well.

As Middle Congo was joined to French Equatorial Africa, stamps were overprinted in 1924 with the inscription "Afrique Equatoriale Française". Stamps were issued for Middle Congo until being replaced by the stamps of French Equatorial Africa in 1936.

== Republic ==
Middle Congo became an autonomous state within the French Community on 28 November 1958 and was renamed the Republic of the Congo The first stamp of the Republic of the Congo was issued on 28 November 1959. Congo gained full independence on 15 August 1960.

== People's republic ==
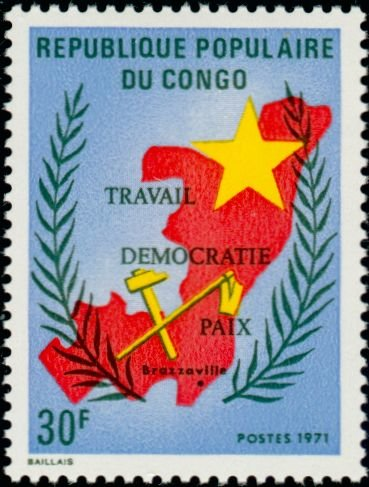
A 1971 stamp of the People's Republic of the Congo

Between 1970 and 1991, the country was known as The People's Republic of the Congo.

== See also ==
- Congolese Posts and Savings Company
- Postage stamps and postal history of Ubangi-Shari
- Postage stamps and postal history of Chad
- Postage stamps of French Equatorial Africa
