= Hayatu ibn Sa'id =

Mahdist leader (1840–1898)

Personal life
- Born: 1840 Kofar Rini, Sokoto, Sokoto Caliphate
- Died: January 1898 (aged 57–58) Dikwa, Bornu
- Dynasty: Fodiawa

Religious life
- Religion: Islam
- Denomination: Sunni
- Jurisprudence: Maliki

Muslim leader
- Dynasty: Fodiawa

Military service
- Allegiance: Mahdist State (1883–1898); Sokoto Caliphate (until 1878)

Shehu Hayatu ibn Sa'id (Arabic: حياة بن سعيد, romanized: Hayāt bin Sa‘īd; 1840 – 1898), also known as Hayatu Balda, was a 19th-century Islamic scholar and the leading Mahdist leader in the Central Sudan region. He was the great-grandson of Usman dan Fodio, the leader of the Sokoto jihad and first caliph of Sokoto. Hayatu left Sokoto in the late 1870s to settle in Adamawa, the emirate on the easternmost end of the caliphate. In 1883, he was appointed as the deputy of the Sudanese Mahdi, Muhammad Ahmad, and was tasked with leading a jihad over the Sokoto Caliphate. Despite several attempts by Lamido Zubeiru of Adamawa to persuade Hayatu to abandon his Mahdist cause, conflict ensued resulting in a disastrous defeat for Zubeiru's forces in 1893. This victory bolstered Hayatu's following and influence, leading to an alliance with Rabih az-Zubayr, a Sudanese warlord and Mahdist sympathiser. Together, they conquered the weakened Bornu Empire in 1893, aiming eventually to conquer the Sokoto Caliphate. Hayatu served as the Imam of Rabih's Bornu, acting as its spiritual leader. However, the alliance eventually fractured, and Hayatu was killed during an attempted escape from Bornu in 1898.

== Early life ==
Hayatu was born around 1840 in Sokoto, likely in Kofar Rini where his father resided. He was the eldest son of Sa'id ibn Bello, a son of the second caliph of Sokoto, Muhammad Bello. His mother, Khadijah, was the daughter of Sarkin Rafi Idrisu, who belonged to the family of Gidado dan Laima, the second Waziri of Sokoto. From a young age, Hayatu was known for his good memory and sharp intellect. He received his early education from his father, who was reputed for his scholarship and piety.

Hayatu later devoted himself primarily to scholarly pursuits, such as studying, teaching, writing, and composing poems. He also participated in the administration of Gandi (in modern-day Rabah), a ribat (fortified frontier garrison) under the command of his father.

== In Sokoto ==
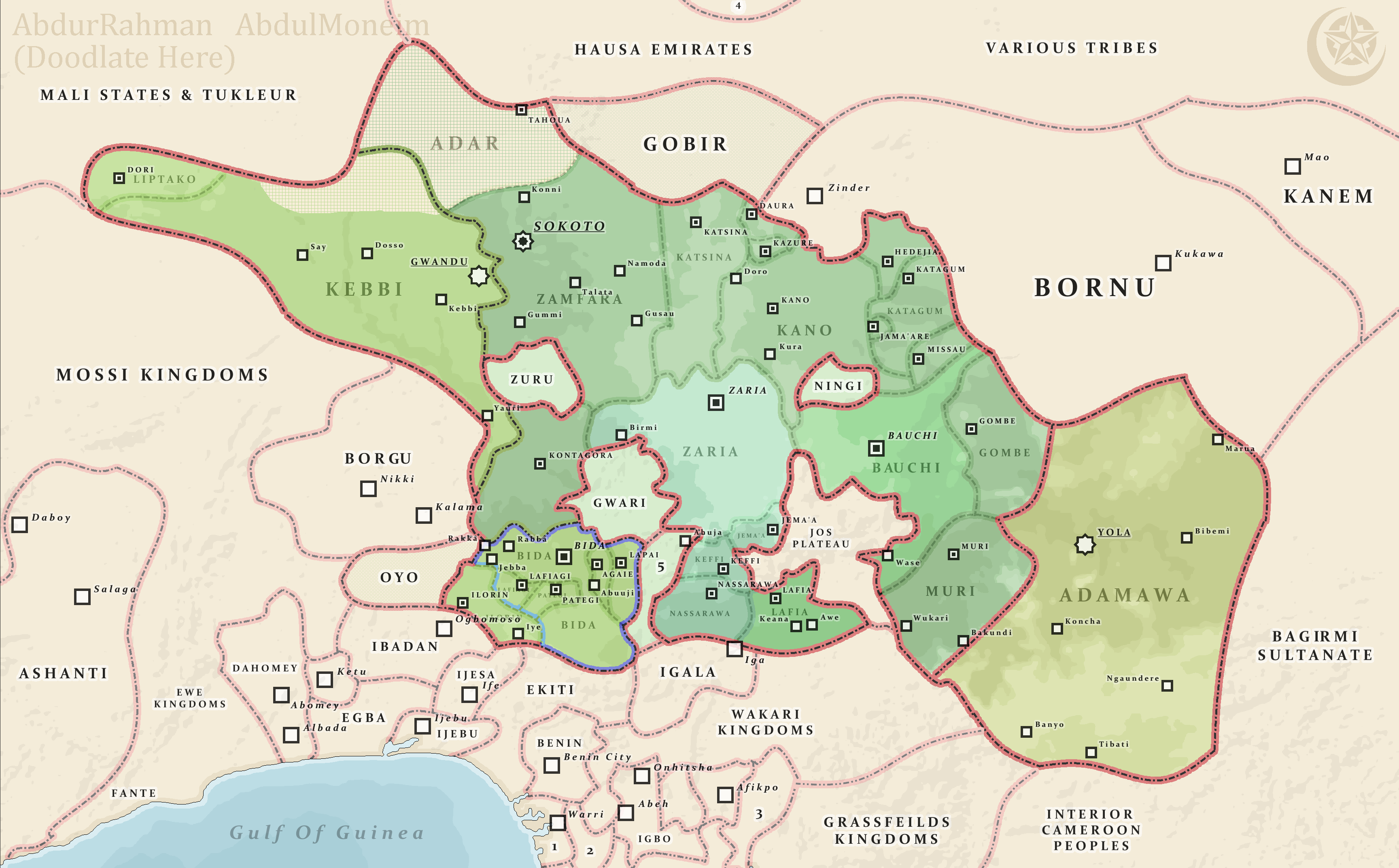
Map of the Sokoto Caliphate

In 1867, following the death of Caliph Ali Karami (r. 1866–1867), a succession dispute emerged in Sokoto. The two contenders for the position were Ahmad al-Rufa’i, a son of Usman dan Fodio, and Abubakar Atiku na Rabah, a son of Muhammad Bello. Hayatu recommended Rufa’i, arguing his greater qualification as a son of Usman, which ultimately resulted in Rufa’i's appointment as caliph. From 1867 to 1873, Hayatu served as one of Rufa'i's closest advisers.

In the late 1860s, Hayatu succeeded his father as the commander of the ribat of Gandi. After ruling for a few years, he returned to Sokoto during the reign of Abubakar Atiku (r. 1873–1877), who succeeded his uncle Rufa'i. The primary reason behind his resignation (or removal) from Gandi is unclear. Martin Njeuma suggested that he "ran into problems with the principal inhabitants, and he was relieved of his duties by popular action." However, Asma'u G. Saeed notes that the large population of non-Muslim slaves in the ribat, some of whom had considerable political influence, made it difficult for learned Islamic scholars like Hayatu to implement Sharia law. She further added that, of the four commanders who ruled Gandi—namely Ibrahim (a son of Muhammad Bello), Sa’id, Hayatu, and Buhari (Hayatu's younger brother)—only the first died there while the remaining three left.

Not long after returning to Sokoto, in 1878, Hayatu left the city and settled in Adamawa, located at the easternmost end of the caliphate. The exact reason for his emigration is unclear, but several theories have been proposed. Siegfried Passarge, a German traveler, suggested that Hayatu was undertaking the pilgrimage to Mecca. Historian Sa'ad Abubakar suggested that "Hayatu may have become disenchanted with affairs in Sokoto after his father’s failure to become Caliph." Saeed remarked that the reason behind his emigration, and that of "many other scholars," was likely due to his perceived "declining moral and intellectual standards within the Sokoto Caliphate." She further added that "Hayatu stood for the revival of Islam and had come to believe that this time, the inspiration was coming from outside the territory of the Caliphate as predicted by the Shehu." According to Njeuma, some of Hayatu's followers in Maroua and Balda claim that he had a supernatural revelation prior to leaving Sokoto, which made him "aware that the fulfillment of Uthman's prediction that the Mahdi would appear before the end of Uthman's jihad was at hand." However, Njeuma suggests that:

Adamawa was one of the richest emirates, and one with a stable regime. Adamawa's ruler, Sanda, had a special admiration for learned men and wanted them in his emirate. In Adamawa Hayatu would command respect not only as a descendant of Uthman but also for his personal merit as a learned man. The state of learning in Adamawa still offered much scope for development compared with some of the emirates in Hausaland.

== In Adamawa ==
As a descendant of Usman dan Fodio and a respected scholar, Hayatu was well received in Yola, the capital of Adamawa. He arrived with a following of thirty-three students and a large retinue of attendants. He spent his time teaching and visiting other parts of the emirate. He received gifts from all over the emirate, which he invested in buying horses and bridles. In 1882, Hayatu left Yola to journey to the 'East', about a year after the Sudanese Mahdi, Muhammad Ahmad, made his announcement.

On his way to the 'East,' Hayatu stayed in Maroua, in the northeast of Adamawa. He then moved to Bogo, about 20 miles from Maroua. He settled there with a large force, hoping to make it the capital of his new state. The district governor of the town, Lamdo Garei, permitted him to settle in Balda, eight miles away, a nursery where the successor to the governor at Bogo received experience in administration. From Balda, Hayatu launched his jihad against the non-Muslim peoples of the area, including the Musgum, Masa and Semaya peoples. The Fulani Muslims of Bogo had failed to subdue these tribes for several decades but Hayatu was hoping to succeed by using the belief in the expectation of the Mahdi to rally the Muslims.

The jihad campaigns were mainly successful, and the newly conquered tribes formed a new district under Hayatu's leadership. Consequently, Balda rapidly grew in size and influence, attracting many young and skilled fighters from as far as Hausaland. His followers built a school, market, and mosque, which served as centers for disseminating Hayatu's ideas about his jihad and the advent of the Mahdi. His followers viewed him as "a remarkable leader was greatly enhanced by combining the role of a teacher, conqueror, administrator and religious leader all in himself." They also viewed him as a healer and that his prayers were "effective in a special way."

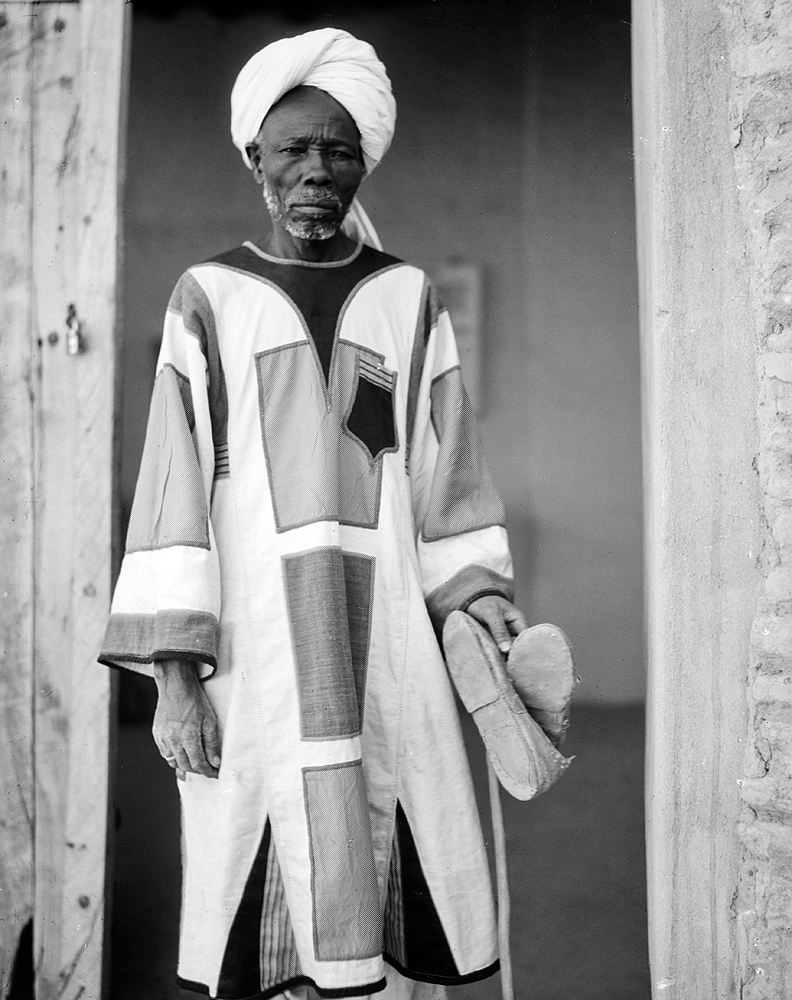
The caretaker of the Khalifa Abdullahi's house, wearing a jibba of the type formerly worn by leaders of the Mahdist Army (1936)

In 1883, Hayatu sent a mission to Muhammad Ahmad with a message pledging his complete submission. Muhammad Ahmad replied, appointing Hayatu as his deputy (amil) over the Sokoto Caliphate and instructing him to "declare the jihad on anyone who disobeys God and His messenger and rejects our Mahdism." He also mentioned that he had sent messages "to all the emirs of Sokoto and their followers" informing them of Hayatu's appointment.

Hayatu began sending messages to the governors of neighboring districts—Kalfu, Marua, Bogo, Madagali, Uba and Moda—urging them to "fulfill Uthman's instructions" by submitting to the Mahdi upon his appearance. Hayatu's growing influence threatened these governors, who faced the choice of either resisting him or accepting his invitation. They avoided violent conflict with him due to his importance as a member of the Sokoto royal family and the political nature of the situation, believing the Lamido of Adamawa to be the most suitable to resolve it. Consequently, some governors sent a mission to Lamido Sanda in Yola to inform him of the situation. Sanda, "a ruler who avoided military campaigns as a plague," refused to act against Hayatu. Hayatu's descent from Usman dan Fodio made Sanda even more unwilling to fight against him. This timid response from Sanda further increased Hayatu's following. By 1890, a Mahdist community had formed in northern Adamawa, covering the entire Marua-Mandara region as far south as Mubi. Hayatu's community, dominated by young and religiously minded men, peacefully cohabited with other Muslims and were marked by their uniform, the patched jibba of the Mahdiyya in Nilotic Sudan.

The increasing number of followers he received from the Sokoto Caliphate encouraged Hayatu to send a mission to the Sokoto authorities urging them to join him. However, Sokoto had already rejected Muhammad Ahmad's claims as the Mahdi. They pointed out that some key signs that were to precede the appearance of the Mahdi, such as wars and major disturbances, "had not fully manifested themselves in the empire." Recognizing the Mahdi would also go against the caliphate's political interests, as the Mahdi was denounced by several Muslim countries. The British, who were on friendly terms with Caliph Umaru, had likely made clear their opposition. Sokoto's silence ensured that none of the other emirs of the caliphate openly supported Hayatu's cause.

Hayatu continued to maintain regular communication with the Mahdiyya leaders through letters to the Khalifa of Muhammad Ahmad, Abdullahi, while his following continued to strengthen in Adamawa. However, in October 1890, Sanda was succeeded by his openly anti-Mahdist half-brother, Zubeiru. Unlike Sanda, Zubeiru was "a more determined and strong character, who apparently did not nurse any similar deep-seated respect for Hayatu." Upon hearing of Zubeiru's ascension, Hayatu immediately called on his followers to prepare for war, expecting an attack from Zubeiru. During the wet season of 1891, Zubeiru sent a letter to Hayatu urging him to abandon his ambitions to take over Adamawa and to settle in Yola. He also promised to provide for him "until the throne in Sokoto fell vacant." Hayatu sent a brief reply, making it clear he was only loyal to the Mahdi.

After receiving permission from the Caliph of Sokoto, Abdur Rahman Atiku, to arrest Hayatu and rallying his governors, Zubeiru marched against Hayatu with at least forty different divisions numbering over 10,000 men in 1893. Despite his comparatively smaller army, Hayatu was convinced of his victory over Zubeiru and constantly encouraged his men of their "assured victory." Partly due to many of his soldiers refusing to fight, the military campaign ended in disaster for Zubeiru. However, while most of Zubeiru's forces were retreating, he had some of his men ransack and set fire to Balda before fully withdrawing his troops.

Although he had won the battle, Hayatu realised that he had to start from Sokoto itself before his movement could gain serious support from the caliphate's emirates. Though he had many sympathisers, most felt that he needed to withdraw his allegiance from a foreign power and "submit to the demands of the established authority." His victory over Zubeiru encouraged Rabih az-Zubayr, the Sudanese warlord, to enter into an alliance with him. Rabih was a sympathiser of the Mahdist cause and had plans of conquering Bornu. He sent a message congratulating Hayatu on his victory and proposed a meeting in Mandjaffa in Baghirmi. This meeting led to an alliance between the two with the goal of first conquering Bornu and later having Rabih aid Hayatu in conquering Mandara and the Sokoto Caliphate. As an assurance of good faith, Rabih gave Hayatu his daughter, Hauwa, in marriage.

== In Bornu ==
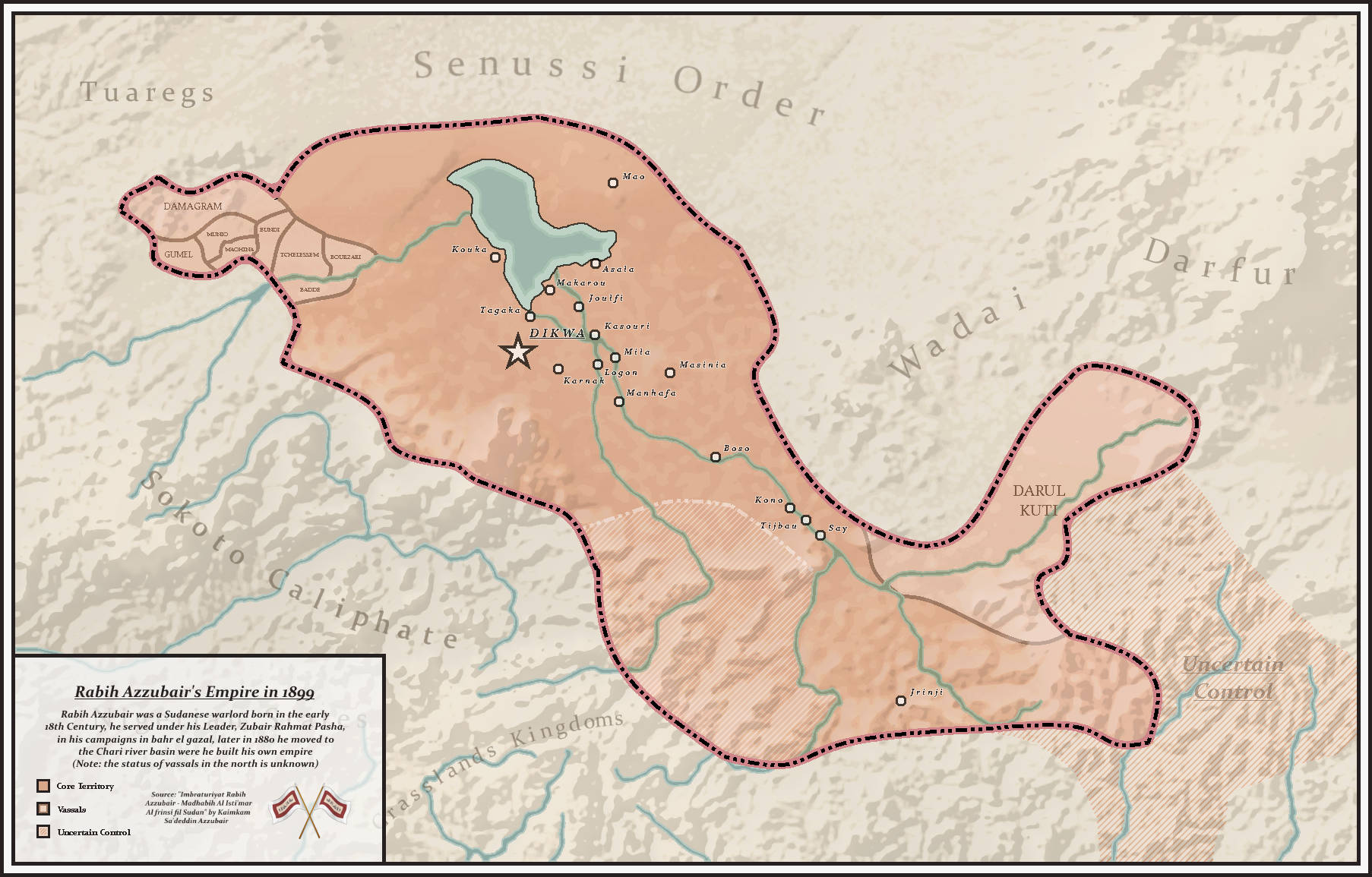
Map of the domain of Rabih az-Zubayr in 1899.

In October 1893, the alliance successfully defeated Mai Hashim, conquering Bornu and installing Rabih as its new ruler. Early in 1894, Hayatu relocated to Rabih's new capital Dikwa and was appointed the Imam of Bornu. His new wife, Hauwa, was described by Émile Gentil, a French colonial officer, as an intelligent but depraved woman who was accustomed to wearing male clothing. He further described her as a remarkable shooter who "never went out unless armed with a rifle."

Hayatu remained in Bornu, serving as the spiritual leader of Rabih's army but was quickly overshadowed by Rabih. He grew frustrated as Rabih prioritised measures against the French advances into the Chad region. Additionally, the severe defeat of the Mahdist army in Sudan greatly diminished the fervour of the cause. Despite these circumstances, Hayatu apparently maintained "a high sense of responsibility." Gentil described him as "a very sympathetic character, a sort of righter of wrongs. Very pious, he spoke out vehemently against crimes." Citing Rabih's reputation as a tyrannical leader, Gentil further suggested that Hayatu "could not have approved of Rabah's actions."

Nevertheless, by late 1897, Hayatu gave up on the alliance and planned to flee Dikwa. He sent secret letters to his supporters, including Jibril Gaini of Gombe, informing them of his intention to break the alliance with Rabih. In January 1898, while Rabih was on a military campaign against the French, Jibril sent about fifty horsemen to escort Hayatu out of Dikwa. However, Hauwa informed her brother Fadl-Allah, Rabih's second-in-command, of the plan, who attempted to stop it. A battle ensued, during which Hayatu was killed. His followers who accompanied him were completely killed as they refused to abandon his body.
