= Postage stamps and postal history of the Central African Republic =

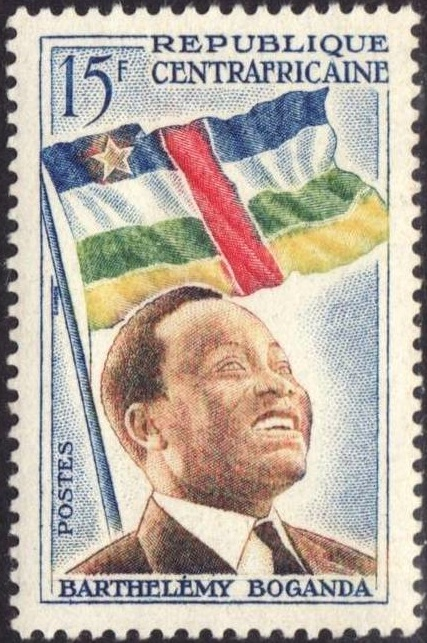
The first Central African Republic stamp issued in 1959 depicting Boganda

The Central African Republic has been issuing stamps since 1959. Before this, it was called Ubangi-Shari.

Ubangi-Shari became an autonomous state within the French Community and was renamed the Central African Republic on 1 December 1958. The Republic became fully independent on 13 August 1960.

From 4 December 1976 to 1979, the country was renamed the Central African Empire when President Bokassa crowned himself emperor. It issued stamps labelled Empire Centrafricaine in 1977.

In 1979 the name of the country was restored to the Central African Republic.

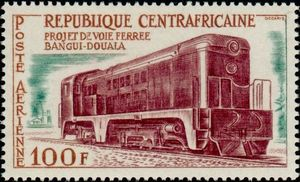
Bangui-Douala Railway Project, 1963

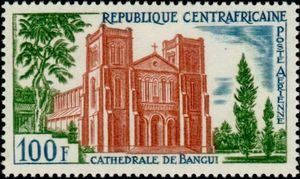
Cathedral of Bangui, 1964

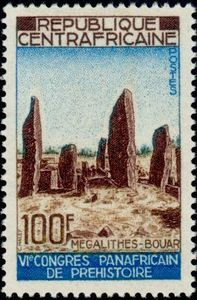
Pan-African Congress on Prehistory, 1967

== See also ==
- Postage stamps and postal history of Ubangi-Shari
