= Postage stamps and postal history of Ubangi-Shari =

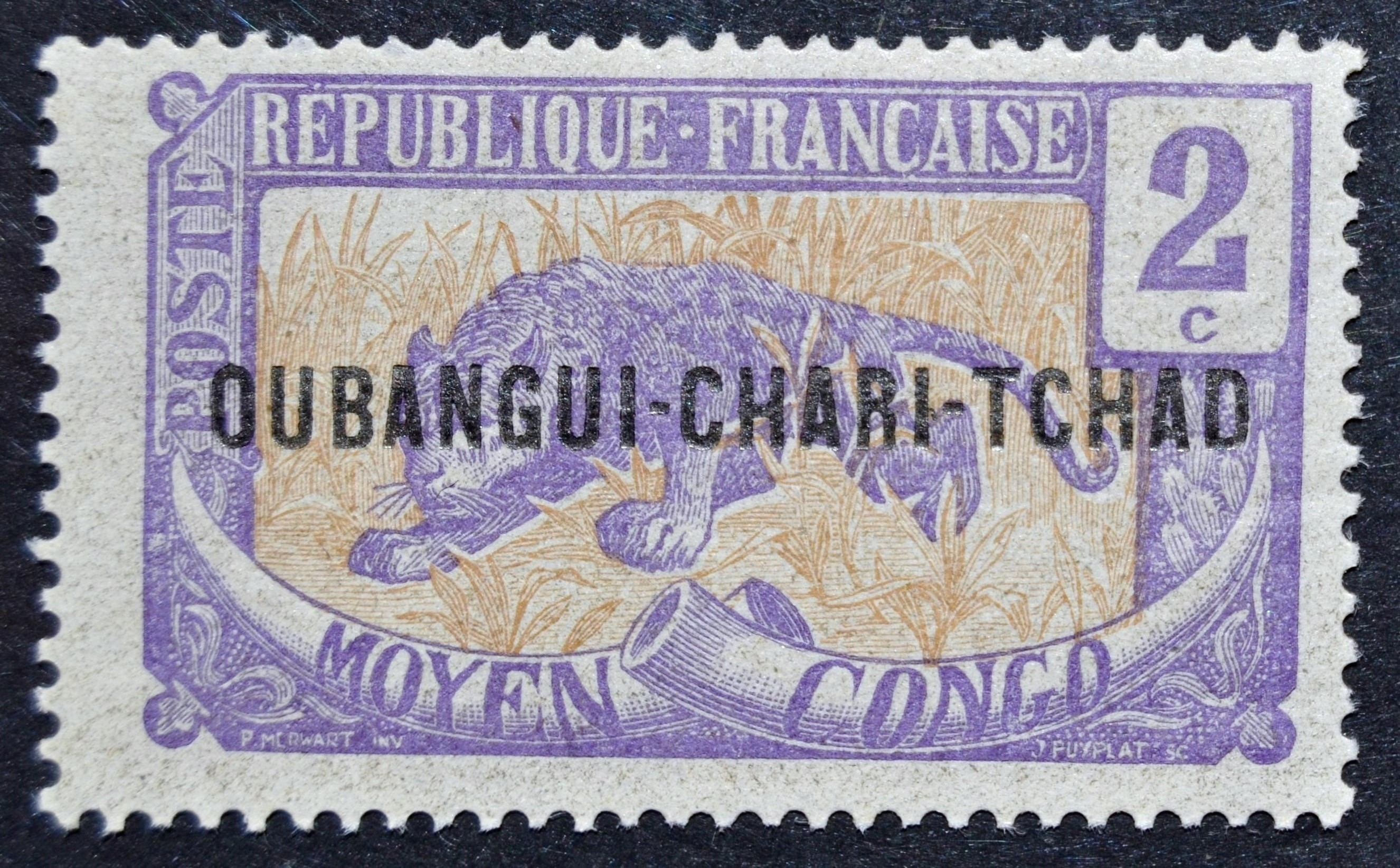
A Middle Congo stamp overprinted for Oubangi-Chari-Tchad

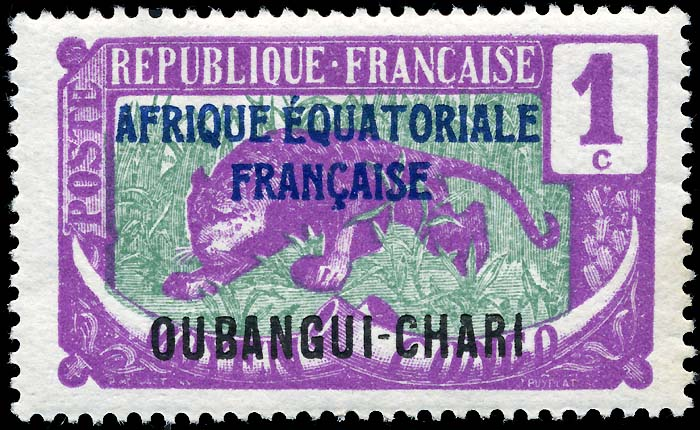
This 1-centime stamp of 1924 has two different overprints.

Ubangi-Shari (French: Oubangui-Chari) was a French colony in central Africa which later became the independent country of the Central African Republic on August 13, 1960. It followed the establishment of the Bangui outpost in 1889, and was named in 1894.

== Colonial history ==
The French did not establish a colonial administration until 1903, upon defeating Egyptian forces (the territory was claimed by the Egyptian Sultan). In 1906, the French settlements around Lake Chad were merged with Ubangi-Shari to form Ubangi-Shari-Chad (Oubangui-Chari-Tchad). In 1910, French Equatorial Africa was formed consisting of the four territories: Chad, Ubangi-Shari, Middle Congo, and Gabon. In 1915, Ubangi-Shari-Chad was made into an autonomous civilian colony. Chad was separated in 1920.

== Postal history ==
Military postal service began at Bangui in 1893, at Fort Possel in 1894, and was gradually extended along the Ubangi River and northwards into the country during the 1900s. Civilian mail used postage stamps of Middle Congo (Moyen Congo) from 1907.

In 1915, Middle Congo stamps were overprinted "OUBANGUI-CHARI-TCHAD" for use in Ubangi-Shari-Chad, and then in 1922 just "OUBANGUI-CHARI" after Chad obtained its stamps. In 1924, stamps were issued with the additional overprint "AFRIQUE EQUATORIALE FRANCAISE". A number of those were surcharged with new values between 1925 and 1927.

In 1928, postage due stamps of France were overprinted "OUBANGUI-CHARI / A. E. F.", followed in 1930 by a set of 11 postage dues issued specifically for the colony; printed in two colors, the lower values depicted a landscape, and the higher values Émile Gentil.

A 1931 set of four stamps for the Colonial Exposition was the last to be produced for the territory; from 1936 on, French Equatorial Africa issues were used until 1959.

== See also ==
- Postage stamps of French Equatorial Africa
- Postage stamps and postal history of the Central African Republic
