= Mandjafa =

Mandjafa مانجافا
- Town
- Location within Chad
- Coordinates: 12°02′15″N 15°09′46″E
- Country: Chad
- Region: Chari-Baguirmi Region

Mandjafa (Arabic: مانجافا) is a small town in Massenya, Chari-Baguirmi, southwestern Chad. Its post office opened in 1910.
