= Coded postal obliterators =

Postmark type

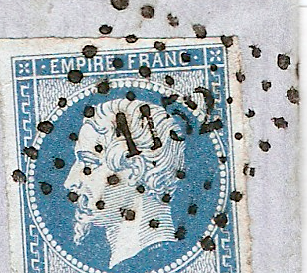
Detail of a French stamp of 1854 cancelled with a “losange à petits chiffres” number 1152. This number was assigned to Dunkerque.

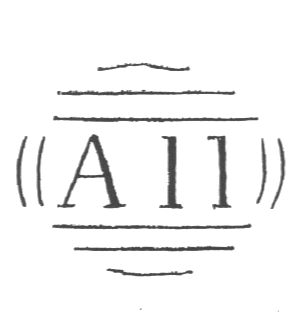
"A11" cancel of Castries, Saint Lucia

Coded postal obliterators are a type of postmarks that had an obliterator encoded with a number, letter or letters, or a combination of these, to identify the post office of origin. They were introduced in the United Kingdom of Great Britain and Ireland in 1843, three years after the first stamp was issued. They became common throughout the nineteenth century but very few remained in use until the twentieth century.

The practice of cancelling a stamp on a letter with a device to prevent reuse and applying alongside, or on the reverse of the article, a dated stamp including the post office name, began in 1840 when postage stamps were introduced in the United Kingdom.

Soon, in many countries, various systems developed where the obliterator had a code identifying the post office of origin. Most such codes were enclosed within a design of dots, rays, bars or concentric circles or ovals to ensure the effective cancellation of the stamp. Similar designs without an enclosed code are known as dumb or mute obliterators. Later the duplex canceller with the datestamp on the left and the obliterator on the right came into common use. Coded obliterators were used throughout the nineteenth century but few persisted to the twentieth century.

Coded obliterations are collected by philatelists and rare examples can command high prices.

Postal administrations which used coded obliterators include:

== United Kingdom and colonies ==
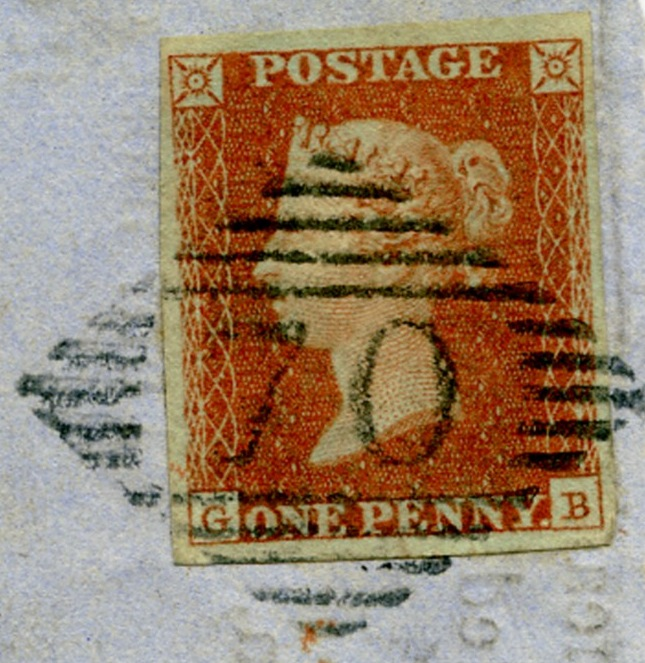
Penny Red with a numeral "70" postmark of Boyle within the diamond shaped cancel as used in Ireland

The first coded obliterators were numerals within a Maltese cross design used at the London mail centre from 1843. From 1844 distinctive and different barred designs were introduced for England, Scotland and Ireland. England and Wales numerals were within a circle of bars, while Scotland used a rectangular form and Irish codes within a barred diamond. Codes corresponding to London postal districts e.g. W21 were also used.

=== British Post Offices abroad ===
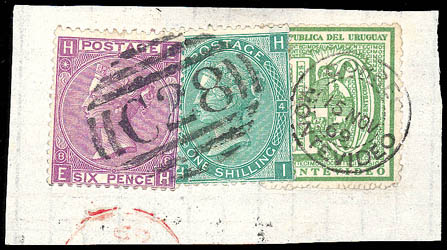
British stamps with a "C28" postmark of Montevideo, Uruguay

Coded obliterators were used at many British post offices operating in foreign countries (mainly in Central and South America and the Ottoman Empire) using British stamps. They include:

- Argentina: "B32" (Buenos Aires)
- Bolivia: "C39" (Cobija)
- Brazil: "C81" (Bahia) "C82" (Pernambuco) and "C83" (Rio de Janeiro)
- Chile: "C30" (Valparaíso), "C37" (Caldera) and "C40" (Coquimbo)
- Colombia: "C35" (Panama), "C56" or "C65" (Carthagena), "C62" (Santa Martha), "E88" (Colon) and "F69" (Savanilla)
- Cuba: "C58" (Havana) and "C88" (St Jago-de-Cuba)
- Danish West Indies: "C51" or "D26" (Saint Thomas)
- Dominican Republic: "C86" (Porto Plata) and "C87" (Santo Domingo)
- Ecuador: "C41" (Guayaquil))
- Fernando Po: "247" (Fernando Po)
- Haiti: "C59" (Jacmel) and "E53" (Port-au-Prince)
- Mexico: "C63" (Tampico)
- Nicaragua: "C57" (Greytown)
- Ottoman Empire: "G06" (Beyrout), "C" (Constantinople), "F87" (Smyrna) and "S" (Stamboul)
- Peru: "C36" (Arica), "C38" (Callao), "D87" (Iquique), "C42" (Islay), "C43" (Paita), "D65" (Pisagua) and "D74" (Pisco and Chincha Islands)
- Puerto Rico: "F84" (Aguadilla), "F83" (Arroyo), "F85" (Mayaguez), "582" (Naguabo), "F88" (Ponce) and "C61" (San Juan)
- Uruguay: "C28" (Montevideo)
- Venezuela: "D22" (Ciudad Bolivar) and "C60" (La Guayra)

=== Antigua ===
Antigua used barred obliterators "A02" (St. John's) and "A18" (English Harbour), originally on the stamps of Great Britain.

=== Australian colonies ===
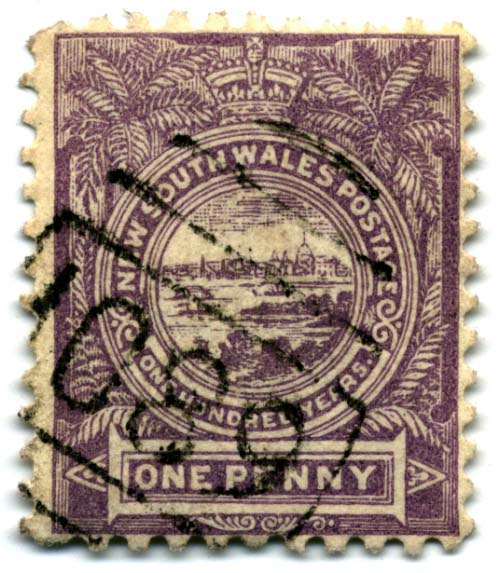
New South Wales stamp with a "1089" postmark

Prior to federation, the Australian colonies all used coded obliterators:

- New South Wales used numerals to "2094" in a number of types and LHI for Lord Howe Island.
- Queensland used numerals to "747" and "BNG" on stamps used in Papua.
- South Australia used numerals to "313".
- Tasmania used numerals within bars to "390". Norfolk Island used numeral "72" when part of Tasmania.
- Victoria used numerals, within various devices, to "2100". Earlier types incorporated the letter "V".
- Western Australia used numerals to "36" and letter codes such as "GT" for Geraldton.

=== Bahamas ===
Bahamas used barred obliterator "A05" (Nassau), originally on the stamps of Great Britain.

=== Barbados ===
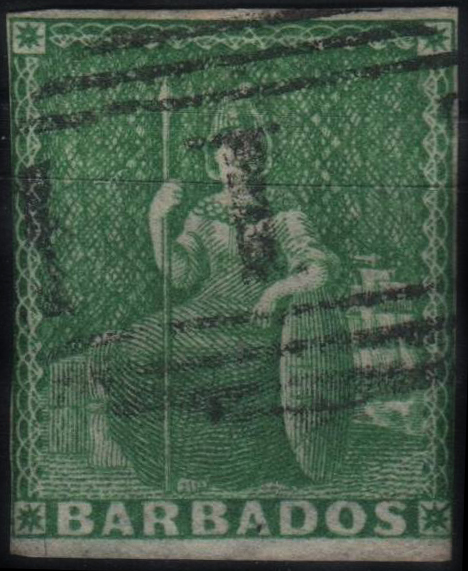
Barbados stamp with a "1" postmark

=== British Guiana ===
British Guiana used barred obliterators "A03" (Georgetown) and "A04" (New Amsterdam), originally on the stamps of Great Britain.

=== British Honduras ===
British Honduras used a barred obliterator "A06" (Belize City), originally on the stamps of Great Britain.

=== British Virgin Islands ===
The British Virgin Islands used a barred obliterator "A13" (Tortola), originally on the stamps of Great Britain.

=== Canada ===
Canada and the provinces of Newfoundland, Prince Edward Island and British Columbia used numeral obliterators.

=== Cyprus ===
Cyprus used barred obliterators "982" (Famagusta), "974" (Kyrenia), "942" (Larnaca), "975 (Limassol), "969" (Nicosia), "981" (Paphos), "D48" (HQ Camp, Nicosia) and "D47" (Polymedia Camp, Limassol), originally on the stamps of Great Britain.

=== Dominica ===
Dominica used a barred obliterator "A07" (Roseau), originally on the stamps of Great Britain.

=== Egypt ===
Egypt used a barred obliterator "B01" (Alexandria) or "B02" (Suez), originally on the stamps of Great Britain.

=== Gibraltar ===
Gibraltar used the barred obliterators "G" and "A26", originally on the stamps of Great Britain.

=== Grenada ===
Grenada used a barred obliterator "A15" (St. George's), originally on the stamps of Great Britain.

=== Hong Kong ===
Hong Kong used a barred obliterator "B62". Also the "62B" supplementary killer. The treaty ports of China or Japan, where the Hong Kong stamps were utilised by the British administrators and consulates acting as local post masters for the traders operating in China, were issued with their own barred obliterators

- * * * * CHINA * * * * *

AMOY 1844 "A1" (1866–85) & "D27" (1876–85)

CANTON 1844 "C1" (1866–85)

FOOCHOW 1844 "F1" (1866–85)

HANKOW 1872 "D29" (1879–85)

KIUNGCHOW (HOIHOW) 1873 "D28" (1876–85)

NINGPO 1844 "N1" (1866–85)

SHANGHAI 1844 "S1" (1866–85)

SWATOW 1861 "S2" (1866–85)

- * * * * JAPAN * * * * *

KOBE 1869 "D30" (1876–79)

NAGASAKI 1860 "N2" (1866–79)

YOKOHAMA 1859 "Y1" (1867–79)

=== Jamaica ===
Jamaica used the barred obliterator "A01" for the capital Kingston, originally on the stamps of Great Britain. The obliterators "A27" to "A78" were used by various district post offices, once again also originally on British stamps.

=== Malta ===
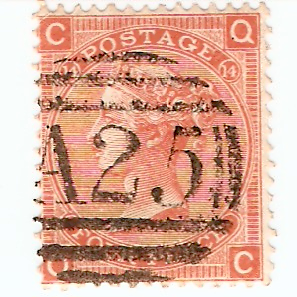
British stamp with an "A25" postmark of Valletta, Malta

Malta used the barred obliterators "M" and "A25" (both Valletta), initially on British and later on Maltese stamps:

- The "M" postmark was introduced in 1857 and remained in use until 1860. This cancel is only found on British stamps and the initial printing of Malta's first stamp, the Halfpenny Yellow.
- The "A25" cancel was introduced in 1859 and it remained in use until 1904. There are several distinct types of this cancel since it was used for a long period of time. "A25" cancels are mainly found on British and Maltese stamps, and also on some foreign stamps due to maritime mail.

=== Mauritius ===
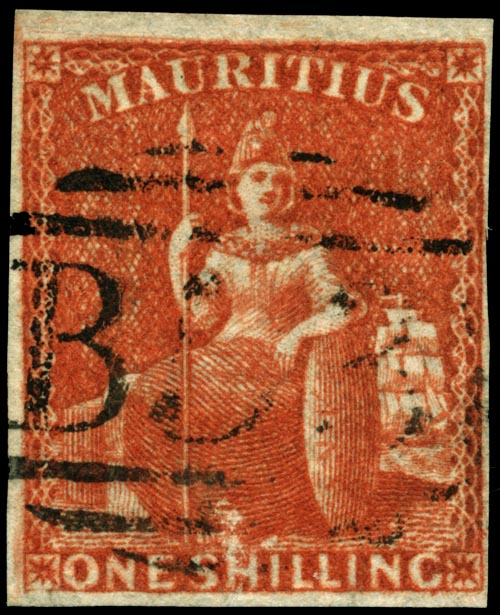
Mauritius stamp with a "B53" postmark

Mauritius originally used a "B53" barred obliterator, and later other "B"-prefixed codes and barred numerals.

=== Montserrat ===
Montserrat used a barred obliterator "A08" (Plymouth), originally on the stamps of Great Britain.

=== Nevis ===
Nevis used a barred obliterator "A09" (Charlestown), originally on the stamps of Great Britain.

=== Saint Christopher ===
Saint Christopher used a barred obliterator "A12" (Basseterre), originally on the stamps of Great Britain.

=== Saint Lucia ===
Saint Lucia used a barred obliterator "A11" (Castries), originally on the stamps of Great Britain.

=== Saint Vincent ===
Saint Vincent used a barred obliterator "A10" (Kingstown), originally on the stamps of Great Britain.

=== Seychelles ===
Seychelles used a barred obliterator "B64", originally on the stamps of Mauritius.

=== South African colonies ===
The British South Africa Company, Cape of Good Hope, Natal, Orange Free State and Transvaal used numeral obliterators.

=== Trinidad and Tobago ===
Trinidad and Tobago used a barred obliterator "A14" (Scarborough), originally on the stamps of Great Britain.

== Denmark ==
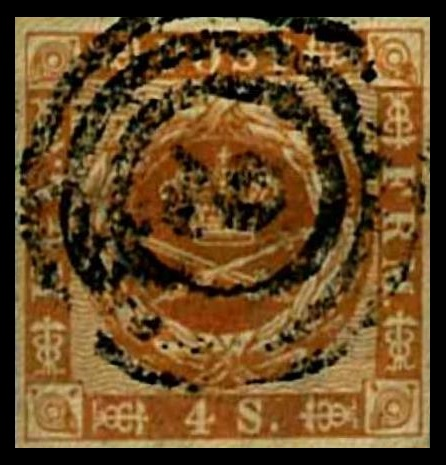
Denmark stamp with a "2" postmark

Denmark used a series of numerals (to 286) within three concentric circles. Some duplex obliterators were used. They were all withdrawn in 1873.

== France ==
The obliterator was as a diamond or trapezoidal shaped grid of dots, measuring about 20 millimeters (0.75 inches) on each side, with a set of numbers at its center. The number consisted of anywhere between one and four digits, and was unique to the post office that used it. For this reason, such numbers are sometimes referred to by philatelists as "town numbers."

Two main types of the losange were used, the "losange à petits chiffres" (small numbers) from 1852 to 1862, and the "losange à gros chiffres" (large numbers) from 1862 to 1876. Distinguishing the two is based largely on the size of the numbers and the size of the dots in the cancel. The dots are noticeably smaller in the "losange à petits chiffres" and its numbers measured approximately 4 millimeters high. Town numbers between 1 and 4494 are documented. Town numbers from 3704 to 4018 and 4222 indicate use at a French Post office abroad.

The "losange à gros chiffres" obliterator had numbers twice as big being nearly 8 millimeters tall. Since the overall size of the cancel remained the same, a larger portion of a large number obliterator consisted of the town number. The list of numbers used increased as the number of new post offices opened, with numbers known up to 6449. Town numbers 2387 and from 5079 to 5156 were those assigned to French post offices outside continental France.

== German states ==
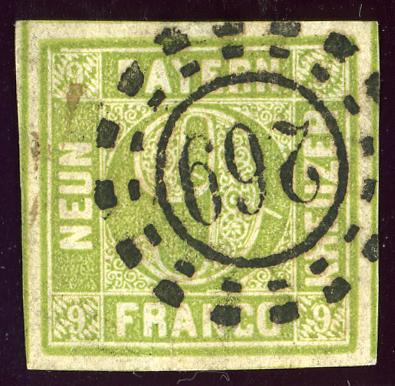
Bavarian stamp with a "269" postmark of Landshut

Prior to unification, various German states had numeral obliterators:

- Baden used numerals to 177.
- Bavaria used numerals to 920.
- Brunswick used numerals to 50.
- Prussia used numerals to 1987.
- Saxony used numerals to 220.
- Schleswig used numerals to 42.
- Thurn and Taxis used numerals to 424.

== Greece ==
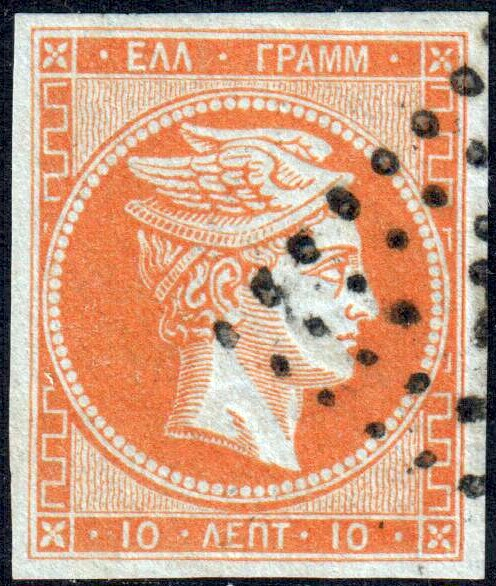
Large hermes head, Athens print (1862) cancelled with dotted rhombic obliteration.

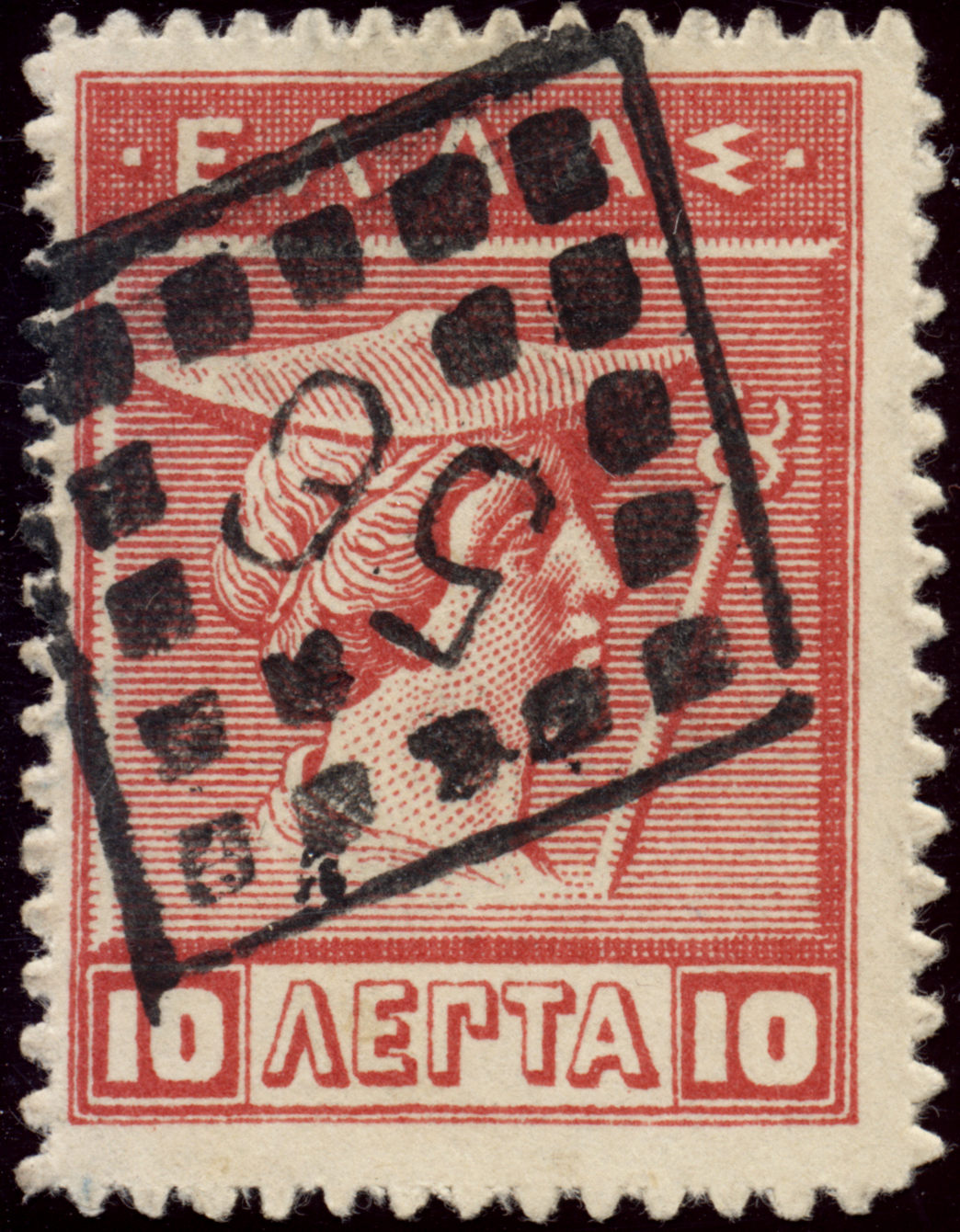
1913 stamp of Greece cancelled with rural postman's rhombic obliteration.

The Hellenic Post Office introduced numerically coded postal obliterations in October 1861, with the introduction of the first postage stamps. They were of rhombic (diamond) shape with the number of the post office at the center. In philatelic publications they are classified as Type I Classic Postmarks. A total of 150 different numbers can be found. The Type I obliterations were withdrawn in January 1881, so they are found only on Large Hermes definitives and on the first two issues of postage due stamps (1875/1876) of the period.

After the founding of the rural postal service (1909), the rural postmen were initially equipped with diamond undated obliterators with the number of the service. These were later replaced with dated postmarks with the number of the service and a small postal horn at the bottom. The original coded obliterations were used until at least 1939.

=== Crete ===
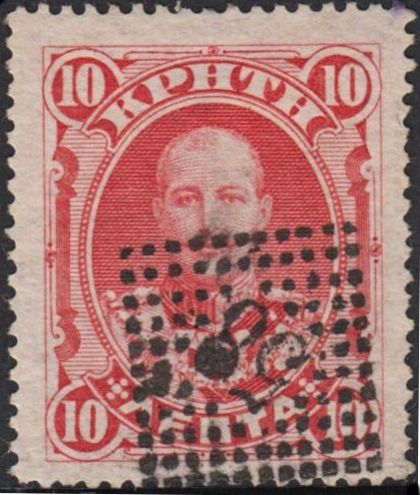
Stamp of Crete (1900) cancelled with dotted rhombic obliteration "58".

The post office of the Cretan State supplied every rural postman with a numerically coded obliteration. They were of diamond shape and were used from 1900 to 1907 to cancel the stamps on letters collected by the postman. Philatelic literature distinguishes four types of postmarks based on the number of dots per side (11, 12, 13 or 18).

== Netherlands and colonies ==
Netherlands and its colonies Curaçao, Suriname and Dutch East Indies used a numeral series.

== Venezuela ==
Venezuela used a series of barred numerals.
