= History of Puerto Rico on stamps =

Puerto Rico has been on the stamps of Spain and of the United States

Puerto Rico topics have been featured on the stamps of Spain and of the United States. Spanish stamps are found at Postage stamps and postal history of Puerto Rico.

== On United States stamps ==
=== U.S. possession ===
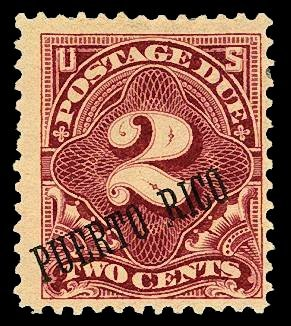
Overprint U.S. postage due

An independent postal service under U.S. authority was established March 15, 1899. But with the Foraker Act of 1900, the postal service of Puerto Rico ceased to be a separate adjunct of the U.S. and was assimilated into the United States postal system. Stamps were originally overprinted with the spelling Anglicized to "PORTO RICO" and later, in 1900, with "PUERTO RICO". Likewise, postal cards and stamped envelopes were also initially overprinted "PORTO RICO" and later "PUERTO RICO". U.S. stamps are now used on the island.

=== Commonwealth ===
- In the “Flags of our nation series” 2008-2012, of the fifty-five, five territorial flags were featured for Guam, American Samoa, Northern Marianas, Puerto Rico and U.S. Virgin Islands. Forever stamps included the Puerto Rico Flag illustrated by a bird issued 2011. The flag of the Commonwealth of Puerto Rico has five alternating red and white horizontal stripes; a five-pointed star is centered on the blue triangle on the left. “Snapshot art” shows a Puerto Rican tody, a colorful bird found on the main island.
- The USPS Crested Honeycreeper stamp viewable at Arago, was issued as a 32-cent in the Tropical Birds commemorative set on July 29, 1998 in Ponce, Puerto Rico.

=== Historic places and events ===
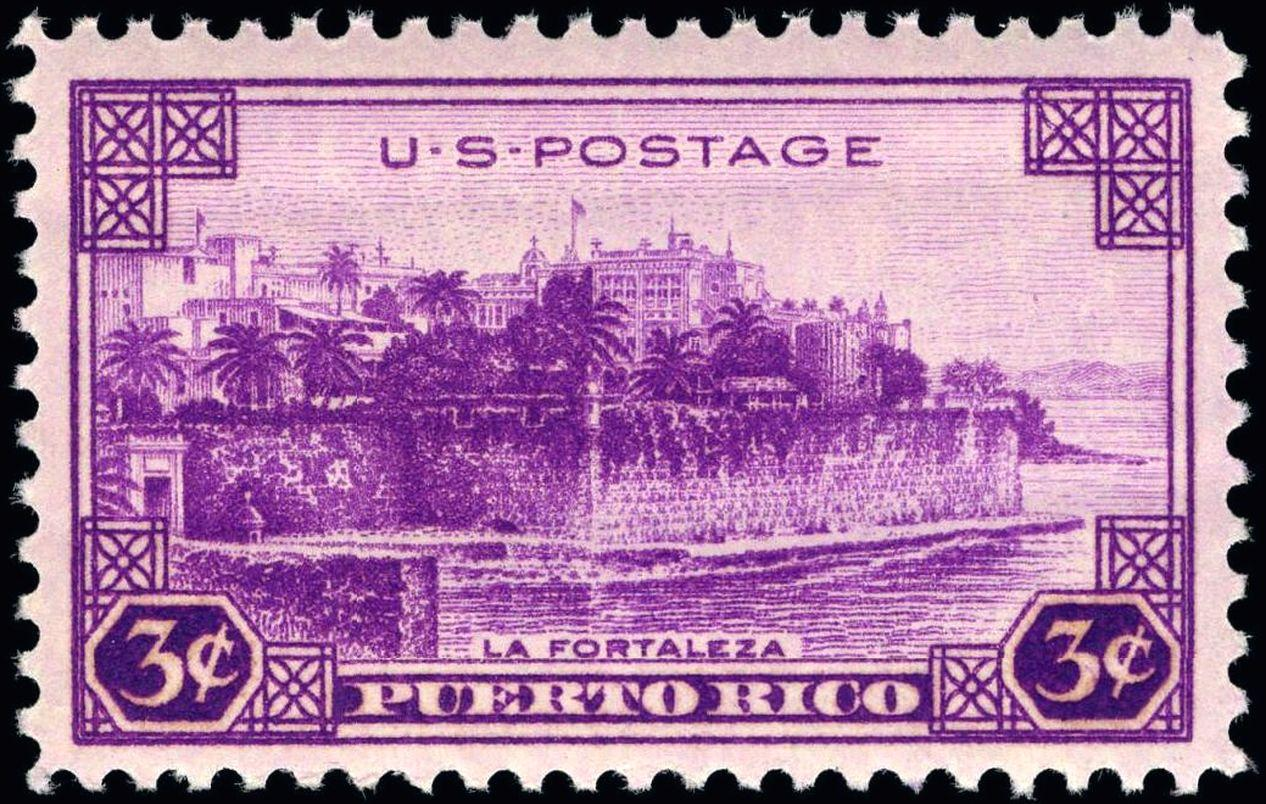
Puerto Rico territory 1937 issue

Insular Territories were commemorated over three months of October to December 1937, in four 3-cent stamps commemorating Hawaii, Alaska, Puerto Rico and U.S. Virgin Islands. The third stamp honored Puerto Rico featuring 'La Fortaleza', the Spanish Governor's Palace. Puerto Rico was ceded by Spain in an 1898 treaty ending the Spanish–American War. Though some thought the stamp was limited to Puerto Rico, it was valid throughout the U.S. and its territories.

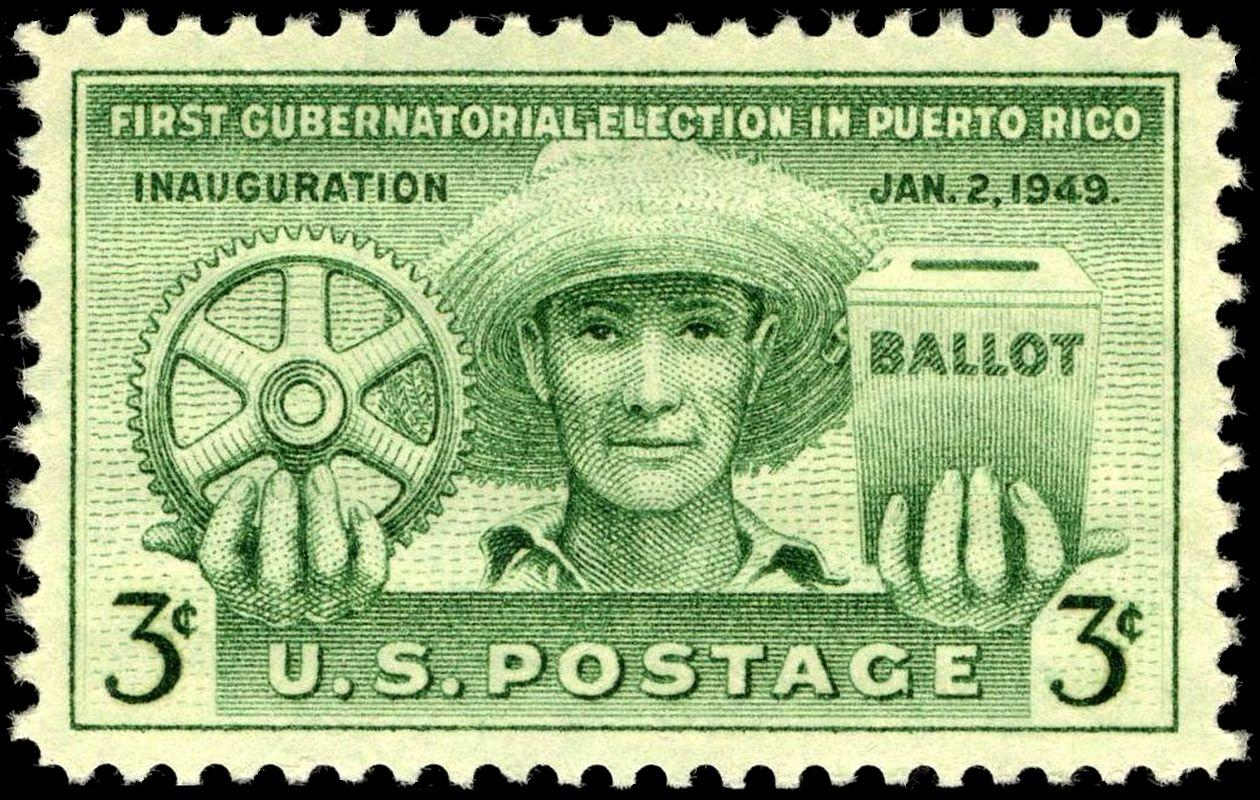
Puerto Rico election 1949 issue

The first free election for governor of the US territory of Puerto Rico was honored with a 3-cent stamp on April 27, 1949, at San Juan, Puerto Rico. Prior to January 2, 1949, the US president appointed Puerto Rico's governors. The stamp's shows a rural Puerto Rican holding a cogwheel for industry and a box representing the election. The stamp was inspired by a sketch prepared by Irene Delano of the Office of the Governor of Puerto Rico. 'Inauguration' refers to the election of Luis Muñoz Marín, the first democratically elected governor of Puerto Rico. The United States issued a 5-cent definitive stamp in Muñoz Marin's honor on February 18, 1990.

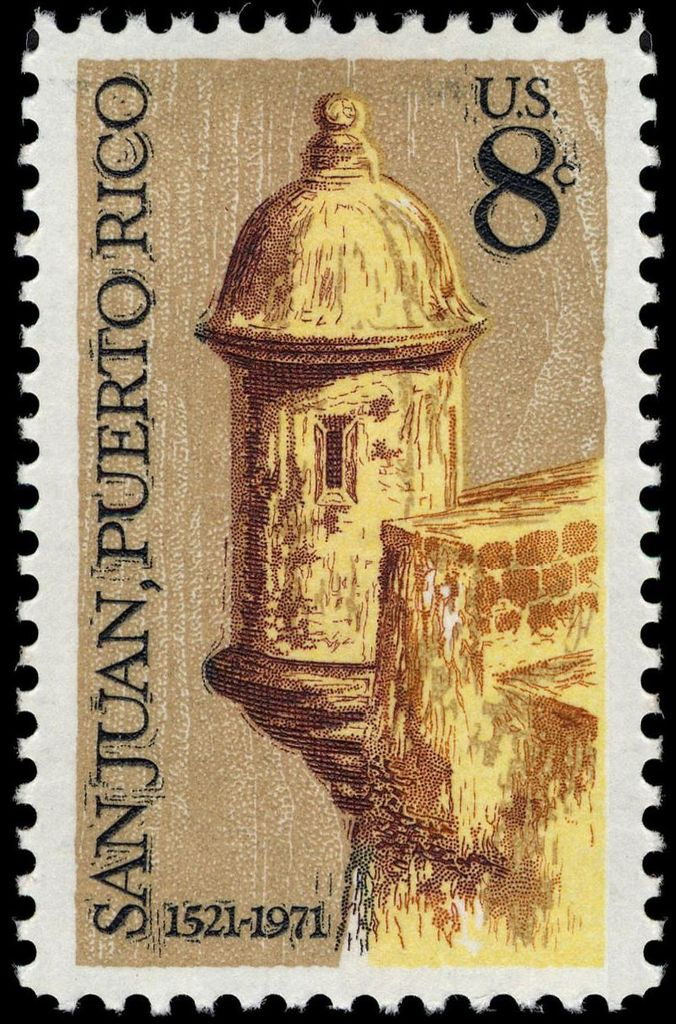
San Juan 450th 1971 issue

San Juan, Puerto Rico was commemorated with an 8-cent stamp on its 450th anniversary issued September 12, 1971. The vignette pictures a sentry box from Castillo San Felipe del Morro. San Juan was founded in 1519, and fortress construction began in 1539.

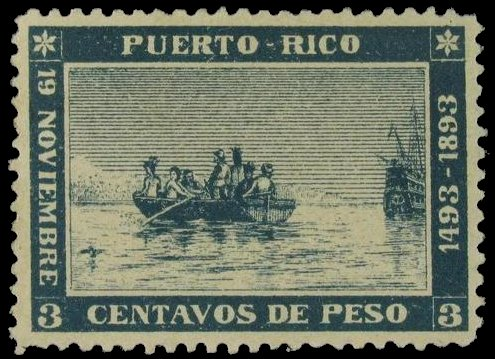
Spanish 400th anniversary of Columbus at Puerto Rico

A Spanish commemorative postage stamp was issued on the occasion of the four hundredth anniversary of Columbus’ arrival in Puerto Rico in 1493, issued in 1893 when the island was still under Spanish rule. It is the only colonial-era Puerto Rican stamp that does not bear the face of the King of Spain.

- Columbus landing in Puerto Rico was commemorated the 500th anniversary with a 29-cent stamp on November 19, 1993. The stamp depicts two caravel ships approaching land. Selected post offices in Puerto Rico participated in local stamp ceremonies and offered special 500th anniversary pictorial cancellations. Designed by artist Richard Schlecht.
- Ponce de Leon was commemorated on a USPS 20-cent stamp on October 12, 1982 in San Juan PR. It was the opening day of the major international philatelic exhibition ESPAMER ’82 held there from October 12–17. Ponce de Leon was named governor of Puerto Rico in 1509, having accompanied Columbus on his voyage to Puerto Rico in 1493. Royal orders to search for new lands led him to discover Florida in 1513.
- The Arecibo Observatory was commemorated on July 10, 2000. Located at Arecibo PR, it is the world’s largest radar/radio telescope.

=== Modern personalities ===
Five Puerto Rican personalities have been featured on six USPS postage stamps. These include

- Roberto Clemente in 1984 as an individual and in the Legends of Baseball series issued in 2000. The image at Arago of the Roberto Clemente single is one of 20 stamps issued in the Legends of Baseball series.

Roberto Clemente was honored on his 50th birthday with a 20-cent commemorative stamp for the baseball superstar on August 17, 1984, in Carolina, Puerto Rico, his birthplace. The First Day Ceremony was held at the Roberto Clemente Sport City facility. Clemente played for the Pittsburgh Pirates from 1955 until his death in a plane crash in 1972, on his way to distribute supplies to earthquake victims in Nicaragua. Over that career, he played in twelve All-Star games and won eleven Golden Glove awards as a right fielder. Holding a lifetime batting average of .317, he led the National League in batting four times, and was named the League's most valuable player in 1966. Clemente led the Pirates to two world titles in 1960 and 1971, voted most valuable player in the 1971 World Series. He was elected to the Baseball Hall of Fame in 1973. The stamp was designed by Juan Lopez-Bonilla, the gravure process was used for printing, issued in panes of fifty.

- Luis Muñoz Marín in the Great Americans series. The United States issued a 5-cent definitive stamp in Marin's honor as the first elected Governor of Puerto Rico on February 18, 1990.
- Felicitas Mendez, was honored for her leadership towards racial equality in American schools on a 41-cent stamp. The issue on September 14, 2007 marked the 60th anniversary of the Mendez v. Westminster case where Hispanic parents in California successfully sued to end segregation in their schools. According to Ethel Kessler, the stamp’s art director and designer, the illustrator Rafael Lopez “masterfully integrated the look of the Mexican muralists with the idea of looking forward to the light.”
- Julia de Burgos was honored as a poet in the Literary Arts series issued 2010. The 44-cent stamp was released on Nov. 15, 2010 for National Hispanic Heritage Month. She was one of Puerto Rico's most celebrated poets, an award-winning writer and journalist. Hers is one of 75 other Hispanic-themed stamps. The stamp features a portrait of Julia de Burgos created by artist Jody Hewgill. The stamp features the poet with blue water flowing behind her, evoking one of her best known poems, “Río Grande de Loíza,” a sensuous ode to the Puerto Rican river where she was raised. She wrote of love and the search for personal and political freedom, perhaps best known for her feminist poems such as “Yo Misma Fui Mi Ruta” ("I was my own path”). She was a teacher, journalist and supporter of the Puerto Rican pro-independence movement in New York during the 1940s. She died there in East Harlem in 1953 at age 39 leaving behind 203 poems in Spanish published in four books.
- Tito Puente is an exemplar of Latin jazz and mambo music included in the USPS Latin Legends series devoted to American music and culture issued on March 16, 2011.
- José Ferrer in the Distinguished American series, commemorated as an actor, issued 2012.
