= Squared-circle postmark =

Postal marking

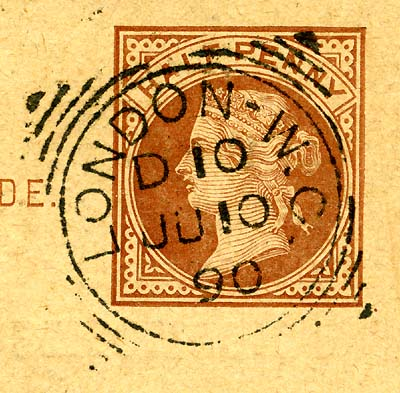
Type 1 squared circle on a postal card mailed London, June 1890

A squared-circle postmark is a type of postmark that surrounds the circle of town and date with a set of concentric arcs forming a square outline.

They were introduced in the United Kingdom in late 1879 as an alternative to the duplex cancels, which were somewhat larger and more cumbersome to use. The additional arcs constituted the "killer" that marked the stamp as having been used. They declined in use from the 1910s, when new types of cancelling devices became available, and disappeared by the 1930s.

Three major types were used:

- Type 1, the first used, has three arcs between the circle and outer corner triangle
- Type 2 has two arcs, and heavier corner triangles
- Type 3 has one arc

In all cases, the name of the town or village was curved along the inside top of the inner circle, with a time of day (plaintext or coded, using several systems), and date underneath.

The squared circles came to be used in hundreds of towns in England and Wales (though not Scotland or Ireland), resulting in a total of about 4,000 distinct types. They were also used in a number of colonies of the British Empire. Similar postmarks were also used in Italy at around the same period.

Today some postal authorities still use this type or similar markings:

- Hongkong Post, a former British colonial, continues to use this marking.
- Canada Post used this mark and continues to use it for first day cover cancellations.
