= Grenada Grenadines =

Grenada Grenadines may refer to:

- The islands of the Grenadines belonging to the country Grenada
- The name used on some postage stamps of Grenada
