= USCS =

USCS may refer to:

- Unified Soil Classification System, a soil classification system used in engineering and geology
- United States Code Service, an unofficial codification with editorial enhancements of United States laws published by LexisNexis
- United States Commercial Service, a trade promotion arm of the International Trade Administration within the United States Department of Commerce
- United States Conciliation Service, a former agency within the U.S. Department of Labor
- United States Customs Service, a former portion of the U.S. Federal Government dedicated to keeping illegal products outside of U.S. borders
- United States customary units, U.S. customary system of units, also known in the United States as English units
- Universal Ship Cancellation Society, an international philatelic non-profit organization
- University of South Carolina Spartanburg, a public university in Spartanburg, South Carolina
- Universidade Municipal de São Caetano do Sul, a university in São Caetano do Sul, Brazil
