= IPOSTEL =

Venezuelan postal regulator

Instituto Postal Telegráfico de Venezuela

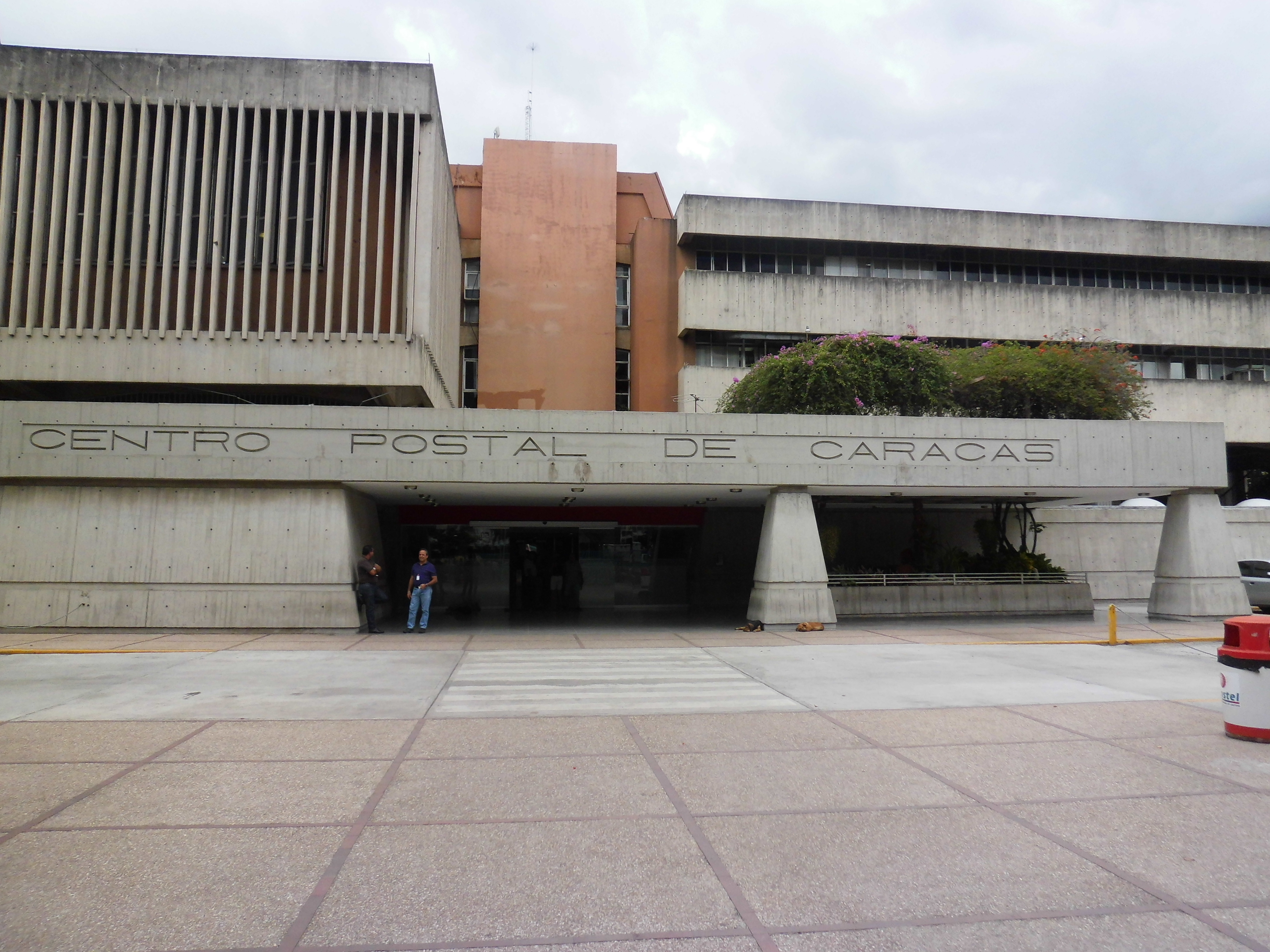
- Caracas Postal Center, IPOSTEL's main headquarters.
- Company type: Public
- Industry: Postal service, logistics
- Founded: January 28, 1978; 47 years ago
- Headquarters: Venezuela

The Instituto Postal Telegráfico (IPOSTEL) is a Venezuelan public regulatory organization of the national postal sector and provider of postal, logistic and printing services.

== History ==
IPOSTEL was granted the status of an autonomous institute by law published in the Official Gazette of Venezuela on January 28, 1978. In January 1991, the telegraphic postal career was professionalized, based on the Law of Creation of the Institute. The training, training and improvement studies of personnel are carried out at the Postal Telegraph School, having its headquarters in the Postal Center of Caracas, in whose annex is the Postal and Telegraph Museum, inaugurated on November 28, 1983 with the objective of preserving the cultural and historical heritage of the postal and telegraphic service of Venezuela. By 2016, Ipostel had 329 offices open in the country, 11 for every million inhabitants, and 2,100 postmen, 67 for every million inhabitants.

== In popular culture ==
The Venezuelan rock band La Vida Bohème released the song titled "I.P.O.S.T.E.L." as part of their album "Nuestra".

== See also ==
- Postage stamps and postal history of Venezuela
