= Duplex canceller =

Tool to postmark letter and cancel stamp

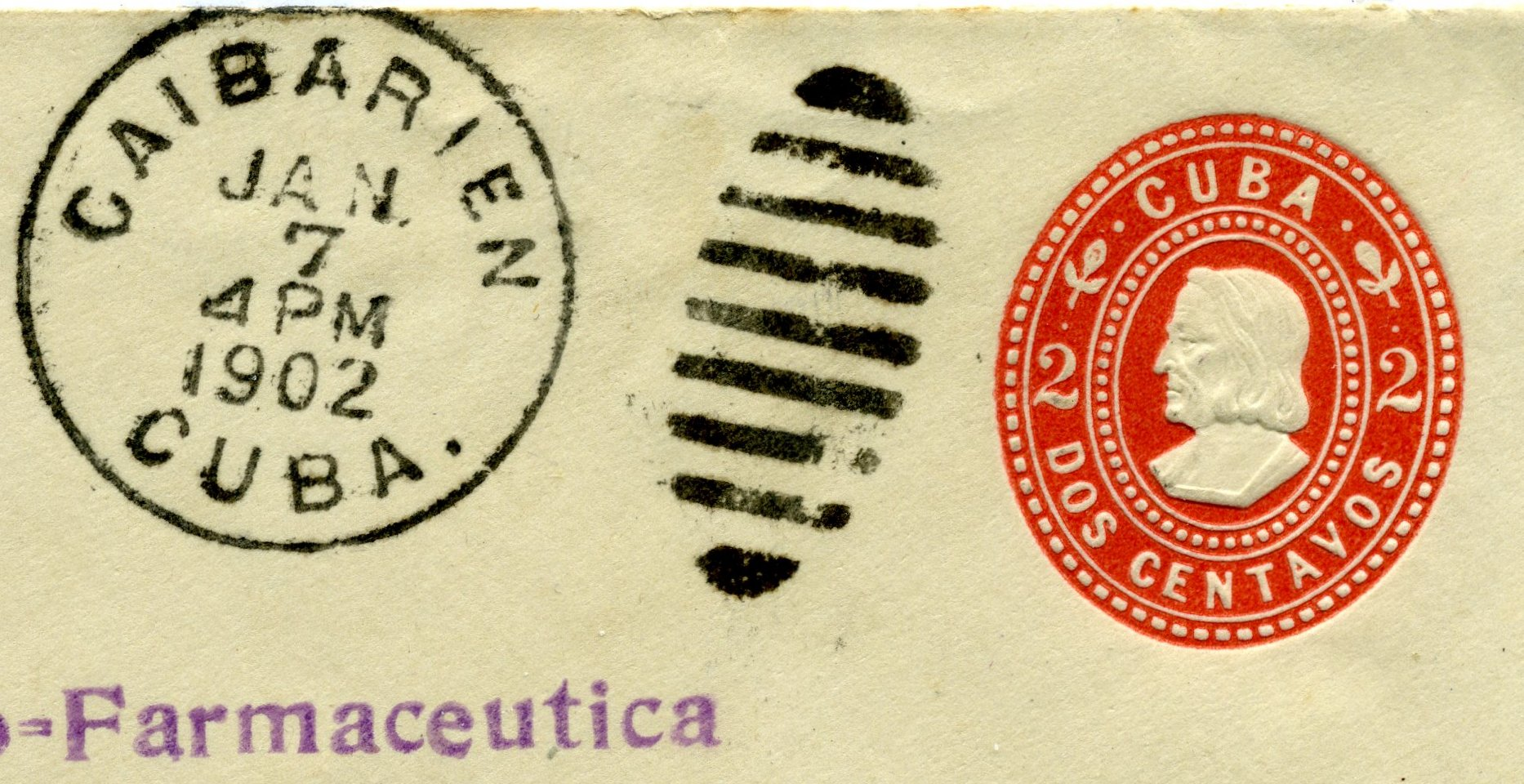
Misapplied duplex cancellation which failed to obliterate the postal stationery indicium.

A duplex canceller was a hand stamp used to cancel postage stamps and imprint a dated postmark applied simultaneously with the one device. The device had a steel die, generally circular, which printed the location of the cancel, together with the time and date of cancel. This die was held in place by a handle with an obliteration marker, often oval shaped, off to the right side that was applied over the postage stamp to prevent its reuse. The ink came from an ink pad.

In many countries the obliterator part of the canceller was coded, in various ways, to identify the post office.

In the United States, they were first used in the 1860s and use continued into the 1940s.

Some machine cancelling devices like the French Daguin machine or the Italian Dani Machine also applied both the "killer" and the date stamp simultaneously. Especially in the Italian literature (and in German literature about Italian cancels) these cancelling devices are referred as duplex cancel.
