= Postage stamps and postal history of Nicaragua =

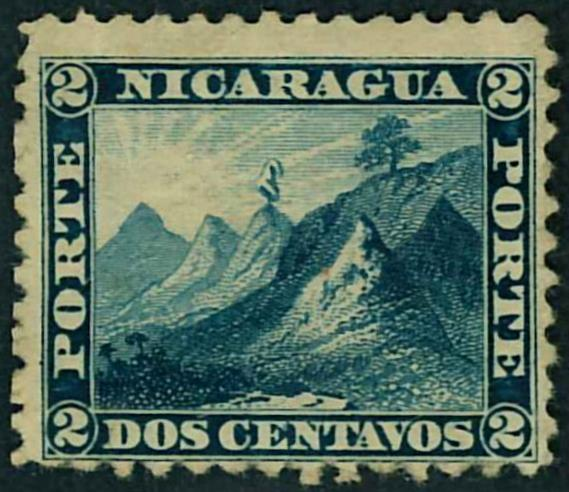
The first stamp of Nicaragua issued in 1862

This is a survey of the postage stamps and postal history of Nicaragua.

== First stamps ==
Nicaragua gained independence from Spain in 1821. It has produced its own stamps since 1862.

Collectors of the stamps and covers of Nicaragua join the Nicaragua Study Group. Search the web to find the group.
