= Postage stamps and postal history of the British Virgin Islands =

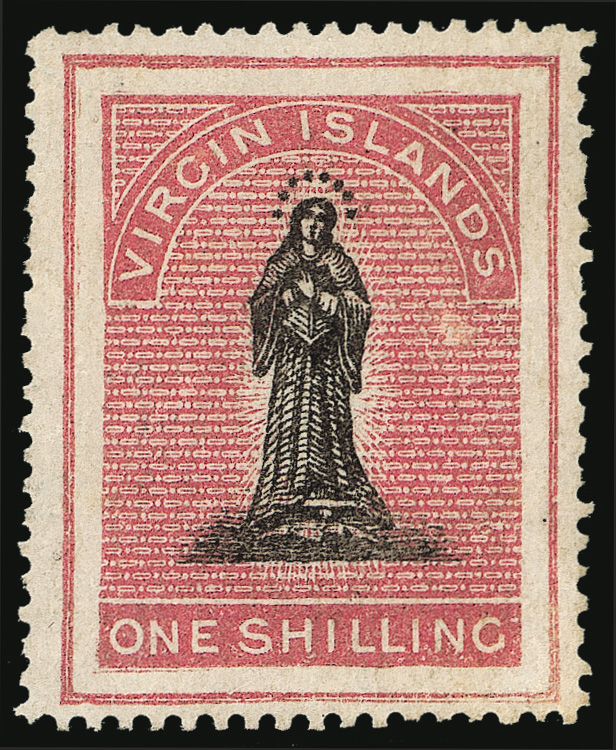
1867 stamp

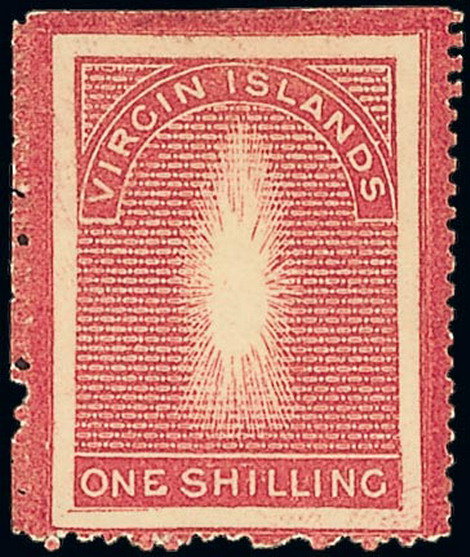
1867 The Missing Virgin is the rarest stamp – only four or five examples are known; the last time a Missing Virgin was at auction was on December 11, 2015 when it fetched GBP120'000.

The colony of the British Virgin Islands has issued its own stamps since 1866. The first Post Office was opened in Tortola in 1787. At the time postage stamps were not yet invented, and it was not until 1858 that a small supply of adhesive stamps issued by Great Britain depicting Queen Victoria were utilized by the local Post Office. These stamps were cancelled by an A13 postmark and are extremely rare so cancelled.

== Early postal communications ==
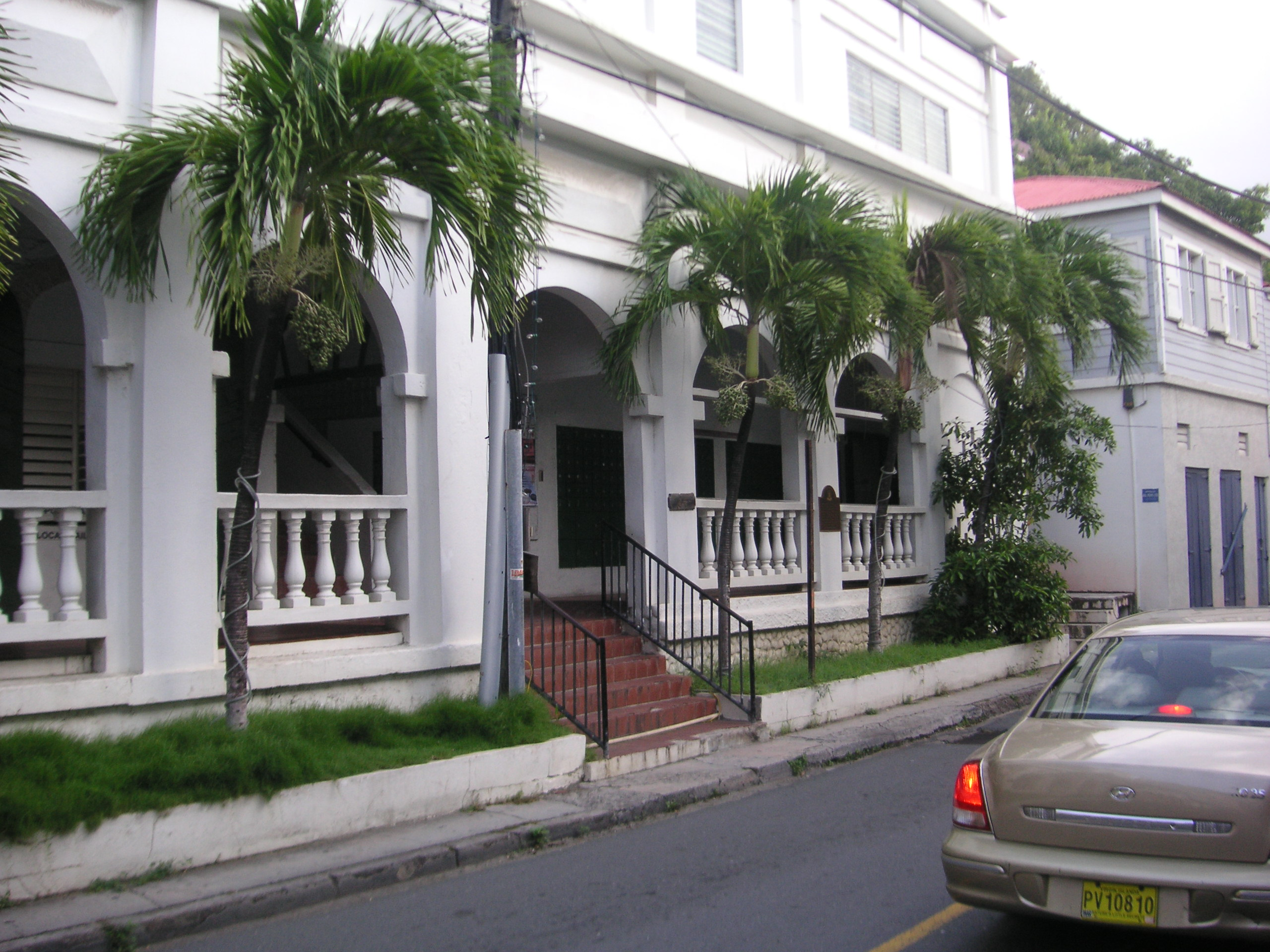
The Old Post Office, Road Town, Tortola

During the early 1800s Tortola became a key port for the postal network in the Caribbean. In fact, Road Town, the main port of the British Virgin Islands, was the last stop on the return leg of the "Leeward Islands Packet" as well as a very important transfer point for mail boats connecting British islands in the Lesser Antilles. This pre-eminence deteriorated during the next 20 years and in 1823 control of the packet service was transferred to the Admiralty, and as contracts expired the packets were replaced with naval brigs. This change had been discussed for a number of years and the immediate effect on the existing schedules and routes was minimal and did not affect the Virgin Islands. By the mid-1830s the West Indies were still served twice a month by sailing packets, the round trip being almost three months long. Barbados remained the first port for the packets, and St. Thomas was their last port before they sailed homeward. In St. Thomas they awaited the mail boats from the Leeward Islands. As a result of progress, in 1835 steamers began taking over the mail boat service in the West Indies and a regular steamer service began in 1842, when the Royal Mail Steam Packet Company started a twice-monthly service from Britain, between Falmouth and the West Indies. From its very inception, the service of the Royal Mail Steam Packet Company included a route from St. Thomas to Demerara (via the Leeward Islands and Barbados) and vice versa. Indeed, Tortola was the first stop on the southward leg and the penultimate on the return voyage. The round trip took fourteen days. When a new contract was signed in 1850, the new routes did not include Tortola and the reasons for this decision included the collapse of the local economy following the 1834 emancipation from slavery, and the lower volume of mail. The correspondence for Tortola was now transferred at St. Thomas. This is confirmed by the company's March 1860 schedule which states that "the mails for Tortola are to be delivered to the company's superintendent at St. Thomas, who will be held responsible for their immediate transmission and for the due embarkation of the return mails."

== First stamps ==
The first stamps, denominated 1 penny, green, and 6 pence, rose, were issued in December 1866 and early 1867, and featured a depiction of Saint Ursula, who, according to legend, had 11,000 virginal handmaidens, after whom the islands had been named. Actually, the Virgin depicted on the early stamps is neither St. Ursula nor a Madonna. The model given to the engraver was the impression of the seal of the local court of justice featuring the goddess of justice holding the scales in one hand, whence the re-elaboration of St. Ursula and the 11 oil lamps symbolizing 1,000 virgins each. From 1867 to 1889, the colony issued a number of St. Ursula stamps with various vignettes, several showing her holding a bunch of lilies. The rarest British Virgin Islands stamp is among these St. Ursula issues, but one where St. Ursula is missing. It is a variety of the 1867 1 shilling stamp with a rose background (Scott #8c) and is known as "the missing virgin".

== Leeward Islands stamps ==
In 1871 the British Virgin Islands and five other Lesser Antilles presidencies formed the newly established Federal Crown Colony of the Leeward Islands, which began issuing its own stamps in October 1890. Leeward Islands stamps were meant to replace local issues but for practical considerations were used concurrently with Virgin Islands stamps. In January 1899, the Virgin Islands resumed issuing their own stamps. Between 1903 and 1956, Virgin Islands and Leeward Islands stamps were used concurrently.

== Three kings era ==
After the death of Queen Victoria, a new set of definitive stamps depicting her successor, King Edward VII, was issued by the Virgin Islands post office in 1904. Similarly, definitives for King George V were issued in 1913 and also between 1922 and 1929. The Three Kings era continued in 1937 with the coronation set of three stamps marking the accession of King George VI to the throne.

== War tax stamps ==
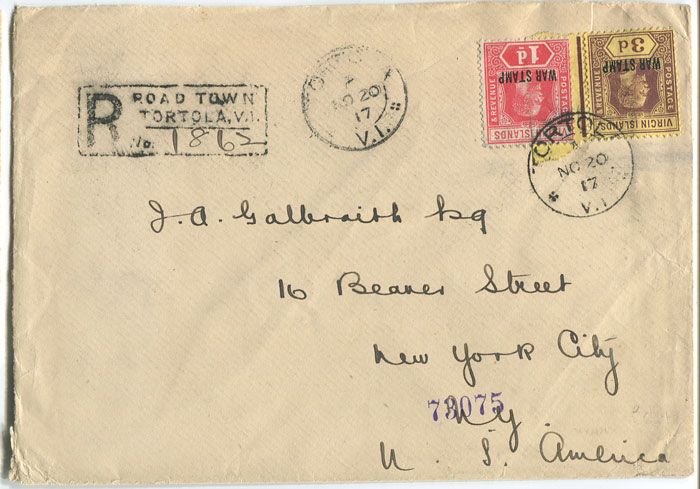
1917 registered cover from Road Town, Tortola to New York with 1d and 3d war tax stamps

During World War I, a number of British colonies introduced a temporary levy on correspondence in order to raise funds for expenditure incurred in connection with the war. In mid-August 1916 a notice was issued in Tortola notifying the public that effective 1 September, all letters and parcels posted in the Virgin Islands to places in the British Empire outside the Leeward Islands had to pay additional postage as follows: 1d. on every letter, and 3d. on every parcel. Incoming postal packets containing dutiable goods were also to be charged a "War Surtax" of 3d. before delivery. "Three-penny and penny stamps surcharged WAR STAMP will shortly be on sale for this purpose. Until these are ready ordinary stamps can be used," the Postmaster's notice stated. On 1 February 1917, the tax was extended to letters addressed to the U.S. Covers or postal receipts documenting proper (non philatelic) use of these stamps are scarce. War tax stamps remained in use as definitives after the war ended.

== Winds of change ==
Following a colony–wide demonstration in 1949, the following year the restoration of a partially elective legislative council was accorded by the United Kingdom. The restoration became effective on 2 April 1951 concurrently with a new set of four recess-printed stamps to mark the occasion. They featured a map of the colony and a cameo portrait of the monarch based on a postwar photograph by Dorothy Wilding who, later, achieved philatelic fame for her contribution to the design of early British definitive and commemorative stamps of the 1950s and 1960s. Printed by Waterlow & Sons, the legislative council restoration set marks a return to the usual monochrome style. The second and last definitive of the reign of King George VI was issued 15 April 1952, after the king's death. Featuring the Wilding portrait, this definitive series of 12 values was recess-printed by De La Rue & Co. on thin toned white paper. The 1c, 2c, 4c, 8c, 12c, and 24c denominations are monochrome, while the others are bicoloured. Maps were featured on the following denominations: 2 cents (Jost Van Dyke); 4 cents (Anegada); 8 cents (Virgin Gorda or the Fat Virgin—gorda means "fat" in Spanish); 12 cents (Tortola, the capital island); and $4.80 depicting a general map of the archipelago. This last stamp is worth special mention in that the spelling of Virgin Gorda is distorted to VIRGIN CORDA. The 8 cents denomination featuring a detailed map of the island had the correct spelling. The $4.80 was later reprinted, but the error was not corrected. The other values, with one exception, depict pictorial aspects of the islands: 1 cent Sombrero Island; 3 cents Sheep Industry; 5 cents Cattle Industry; 60 cents Dead Man's Chest; $1.20 Sir Francis Drake Channel; $2.40 Road Town. The 24 cents stamp depicts the badge of the presidency featuring St. Ursula with twelve lighted lamps.

While the misspelling error on the highest value did not stir excitement among collectors, the lowest denomination, 1 cent, generated some interest. It features the lighthouse on Sombrero - a rock nicknamed "Spanish Hat" by generations of sailors. At the time the tiny island was included in the Virgin Islands colony, but in 1956 with the dissolution of the Federation of the Leeward Islands its control passed to St Kitts-Nevis-Anguilla.

The selling of stamps to collectors made up half of government revenue during the 1950s.

== Stamp currency ==
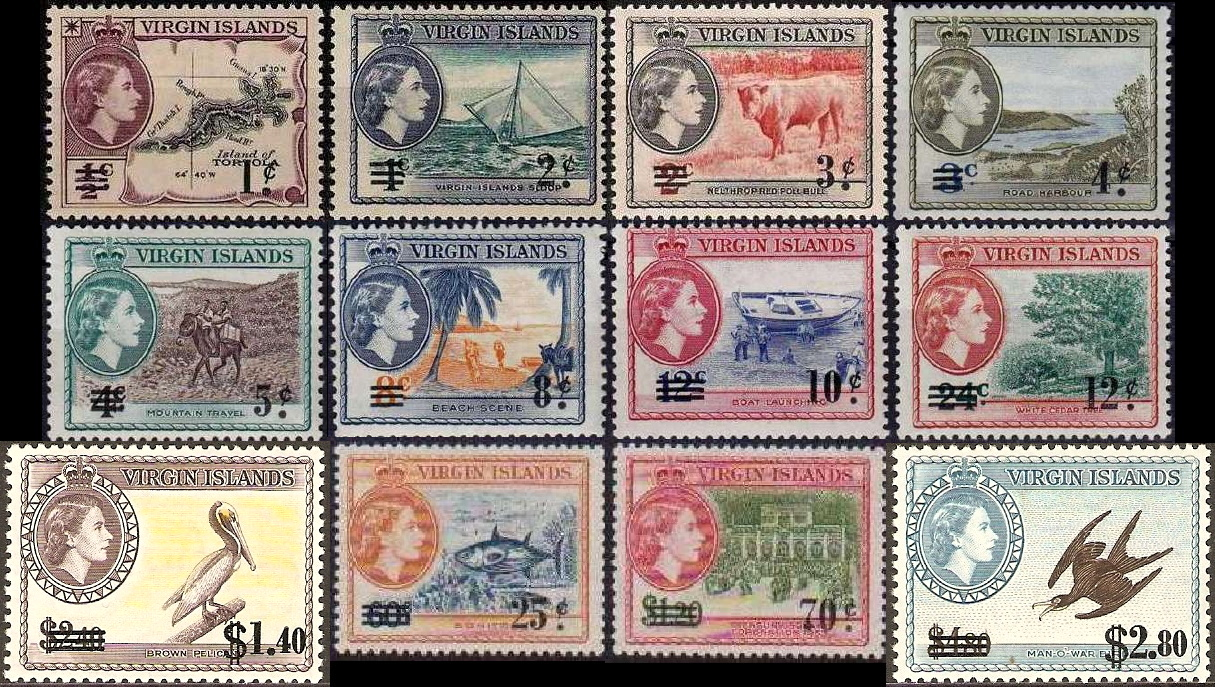
1962 definitive set overprinted in US $ denominations

In 1951 a new decimal currency ($1 British West Indies = 100 cents) was introduced while stamps with British currency (1d. = 2c.) were still in use. This situation generated conversion problems since the US dollar was actually used for payments. Virgin Islanders regarded the British currency as "problematic", and had a strong dislike for the "Beewee" dollar. Given these circumstances postal clerks had to convert every transaction from pound sterling to BWI$, and finally to US$ [BWI$1.20 was the equivalent of 5 shillings (60 pence) or 70USc. - which also translated 2 BWI cents into 1 penny]. The post office had to perforce divide by 12 and multiply by 7 for each transaction. To compound the problem, many of the postal rates did not precisely convert to US cents. Commercial covers (and even philatelically inspired covers) with the postal rate paid by a combination of stamps in the old UK currency and the new Beewee cents are rather scarce. The "Beewee" headache came to an end on 10 December 1962, when the Queen Elizabeth II definitive series was re-issued with overprints giving new denominations in US currency. Three years earlier, in 1959, the US dollar had become the legal tender in the Virgin Islands, but by that time stamps in British currency had long been obsolete. Since 1917, when the USA purchased the former Danish West Indies (St. Thomas, St. John and St Croix - known as the United States Virgin Islands), the US dollar enjoyed great popularity in the B.V.I. and in due course became the de facto currency. Fifty years later, in 1967, the local legislature passed a bill making the US dollar the only legal tender.

== Change of the territory's name ==
The word "BRITISH" was used for the first time in 1951 on Virgin Islands postage stamps issued to salute the restoration of the constitution and legislative council. The subsequent issues feature the traditional "Virgin Islands" inscription. Later on, as a result of a Foreign & Commonwealth Office memorandum, beginning in 1968 and with only two exceptions (1968, Martin Luther King; and 1976, United States Virgin Islands and BVI Friendship Day, stamps) all Virgin Islands issues bear the legend: "BRITISH VIRGIN ISLANDS."

== Modern era stamps ==
A set of four stamps depicting local butterflies issued in 1978

Since 1866 the B.V.I. has issued about 1,450 stamps and in the last forty years they have been constantly featuring more some of the most popular thematic aspects. In fact one of the major reasons for their great popularity is that B.V.I. stamps depict extremely interesting topics such as sport, ships, stamps on stamps, pirates, historical figures, scientists, flora and fauna, birds, orchids, mushrooms, maps, Rotary, Lions, chess, medicine, coins, sealife, sea shells, members of the royal family, authors, politicians, and famous Virgin Islanders.
