= Postage stamps and postal history of Peru =

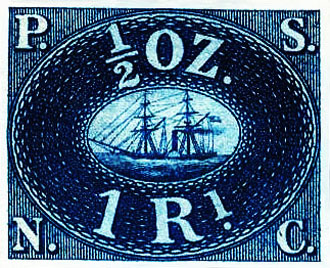
1 real provisional stamp of the Pacific Steam Navigation Company

In Pre-Columbian times, the Inca Empire relied on messengers named chasquis for official communications; the chasquis used a special stone-paved road named Capac Ñan, and quipus, cotton or camelid fiber strings, collecting data with a special pattern of knots and colors. After the Spanish conquest of Peru, the old Inca system was preserved in their basics, still using chasquis and Capac Ñan, but without quipus deemed as "tool for idolatries" by Spanish colonial authorities, founding the rich Viceroyalty of Perú. In 1821, Peru declared independence from Spain and decisively defeated colonial forces at the Battle of Ayacucho in 1824.

The newly created Republic of Peru began using lithographed stamps in 1857 that initially were provided by the Pacific Steam Navigation Company, a British shipping service serving mail and trade at Western South America. a British shipping service serving mail and trade in western South America. The Peruvian government authorized, as essay, using only two PSNC stamps (1 real blue and 2 reales red) for mail in the Peruvian postal service, from December 1, 1857.

After a successful experience, Peru issued their own lithographed stamps in March 1858, in a three-values issue; this created the first stamp error in Peruvian philately: the half peso rose. Still, a lot of copies of Peru's PSNC stamps circulation were forged, with colors never circulated as state-sponsored mail, or fantasy cancellations.

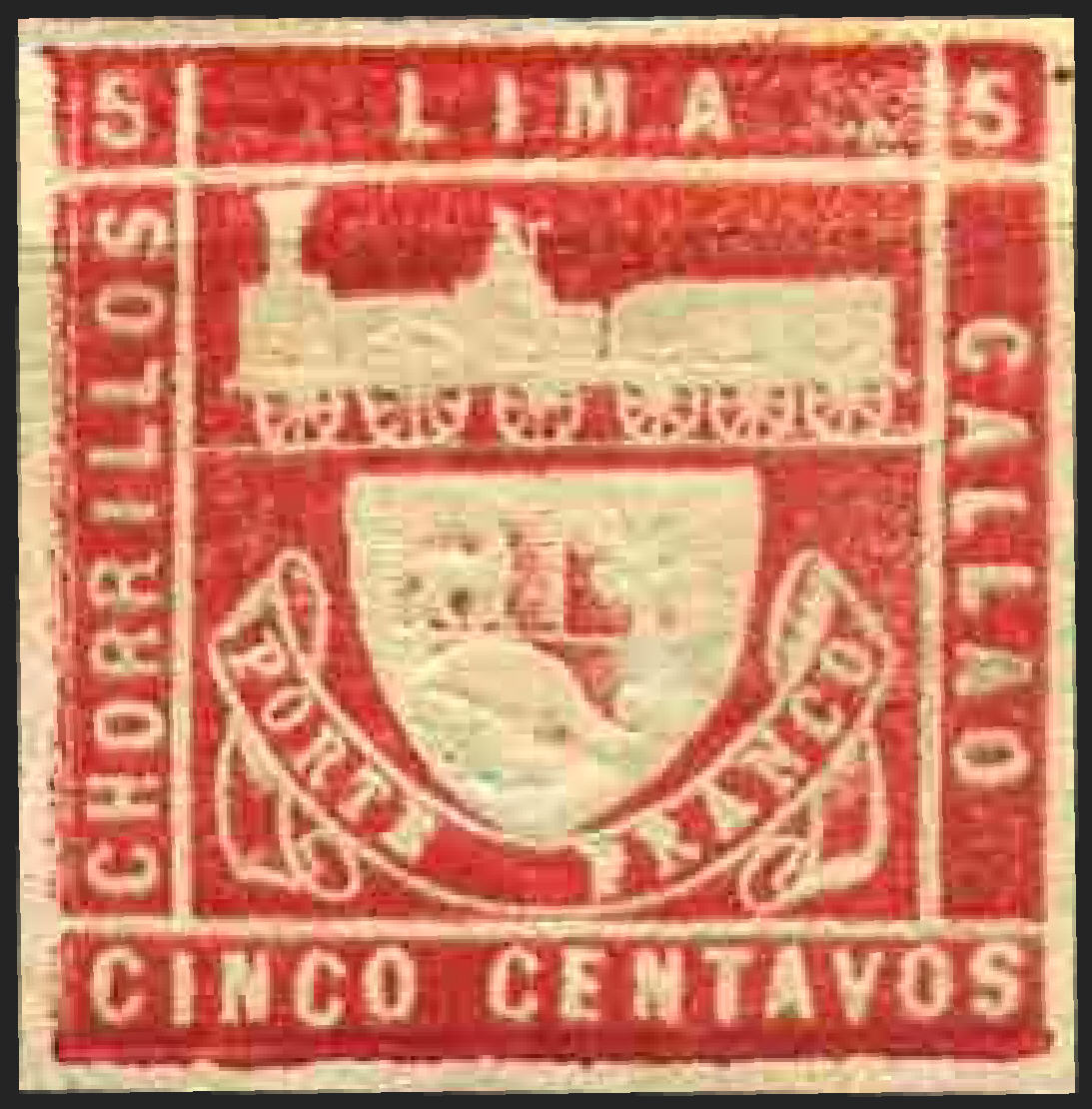
So called Trencito, a commemorative stamp from April 1870, one of the first in the world. Note the embossing at the center of the stamp on the coat of arms and on the train itself. It was produced in Lima on a "Lecoq" machine of French manufacture.

Around 1860, the Peruvian government purchased a French-made device (the so-called "Lecoq" press) that was used to print, emboss and cut imperforate stamps from paper strips. This press was used in four stamps issued with national arms (1 dinero red, 1 peseta light brown, 1 dinero green, and 1 peseta orange). The commemorative stamp illustrated to the right (the "Trencito" or "little train" of 1870) was one of the last Peru produced on this rare machine, with the 2 centavos light blue (the "Llamita" stamp). After this issues, Peruvian postal service only used perforated stamps from 1874 onwards.

For a catalogue used by collectors to classify early Peruvian (imperforate) stamps by their cancellations, see Lamy (and Rinck).
