= Daguin machine =

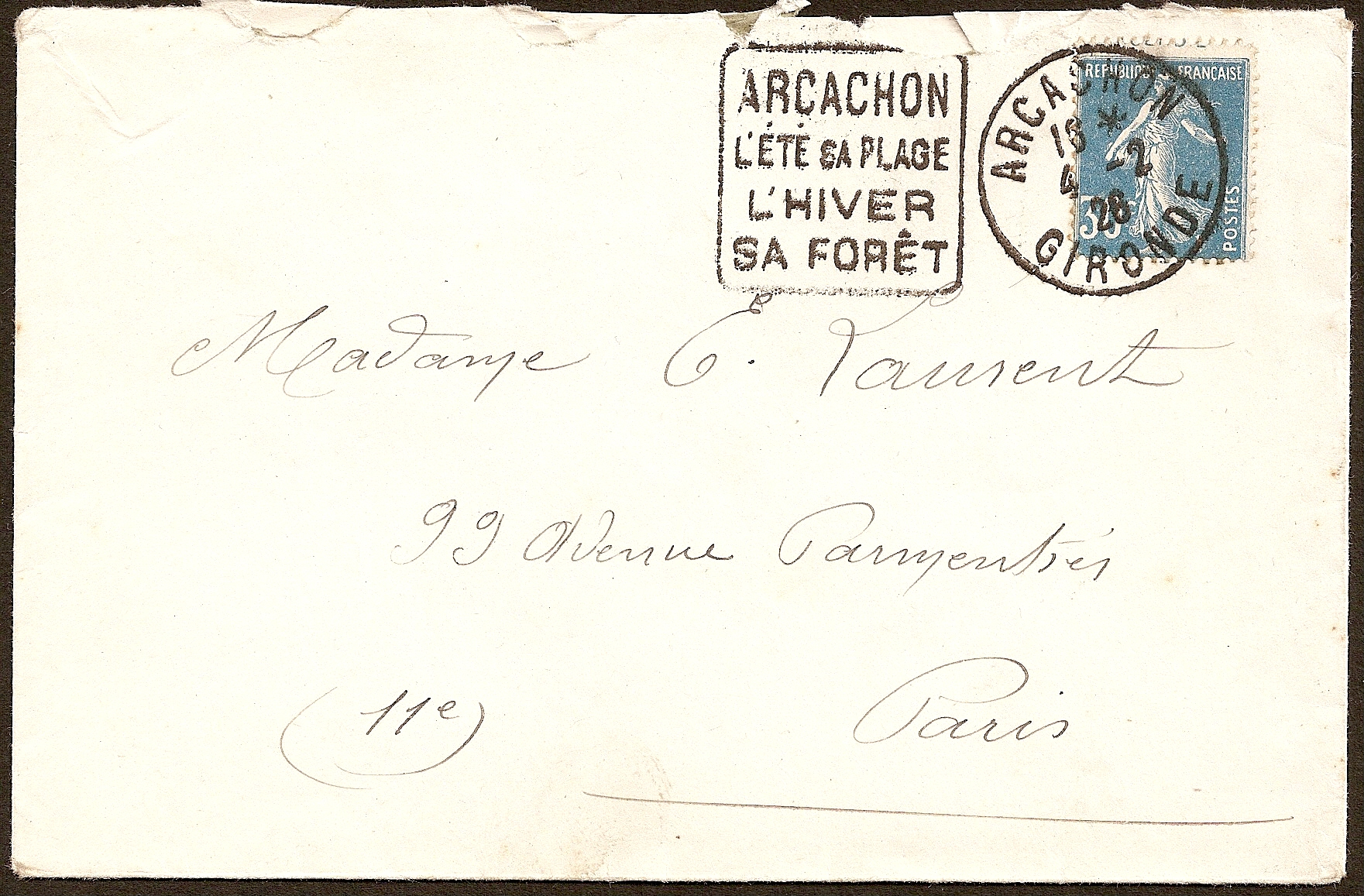
A 1926 cover cancelled by a Daguin machine. One of the datestamps was replaced with a touristic message for Arcachon.

The Daguin machine was one of the first cancelling machines used by the French postal administration. It was created by Eugène Daguin (1849–1888). Its first official use took place in June 1884 in Paris. It could cancel three thousand covers per hour.

Two datestamps were printed in one move by the postal clerk: the first cancelled the postage stamp and the second was a readable proof of date on the cover. Until 1949, the datestamp centers were 28 millimeters away from one another.

In the 1900s, more efficient machines replaced the Daguin. But it came back to service in the 1920s: the second datestamp was replaced by a commercial message inscribed in a round cornered quadrilateral. The official retirement of the Daguin machines was declared in the 1960s, with some exceptional use until the 1970s.

Philatelists discovered and studied the machine and its twin cancellations in the 1950s.

== Description ==
=== Genesis ===
Eugène Daguin was amongst the engineers who proposed "stamping machine" projects to the French posts. The latter was looking for a mechanical device that could quickly cancel an increasing amount of mail. Until the first trials of these machines, the clerk's arms were the only mean to cancel the stamp and to "stamp" the mail (print the date and place of departure).

In June 1881, Daguin recorded a first patent (#143668). The machine appeared in a drawing like a sewing machine under which the mail was moved and cancelled. But a sentence in the patent described what the final machine would look like: "a stamping and cancelling machine with an articulated stamp carrier functioning by hand". Machines described in patents #151332 and #151355 recorded on 30 September 1882, completed three times in 1883, were closer to this sentence than the initial drawing. The machine was fixed to the table. The clerk moved a metallic arm whose extremity hold two datestamp carriers. The clerk lowered the arm toward the mail: the gesture permitted the inking of the datestamps thank to an upward roll. A "touching piston" immobilized the piece of mail firmly on the table: a clear postmark could be made in one move and a spring quickly raised the arm upward. Daguin explained that the piston and the spring avoided blur of ink on the letter. However the postal clerk must pay attention to his second hand that moved the mail on the table.

The cancellations evolved with the wear, the renewal and the changing by postal regulations of the datestamps. They were affixed on the two stamp carriers that were independent from one another: two different datestamps could be used at the same time. In the 1920s one of those was replaced with a round cornered quadrilateral containing a commercial text.

=== Tests ===
Trials took place between 29 August 1881 and July 1882 with a round datestamp and a 196-point squared cancellation. Daguin recorded the 30 September 1882 patent after this.

A new trial period took place after a new addition to the patent on 15 January 1883. Between the 27 February and the 13 March 1883 the cancellations were with two datestamps with a constant distance between their center: 46 millimeters, and 19 millimeters between their outer circle line.

Additions to the patent on 24 October and 4 December 1883 gave a precise description of the machine by Daguin, including the "touching piston".

In June 1884, the first machines officially were in use in some Parisian post offices, in September 1884 in the first offices in the rest of the country.

=== The cancellation ===
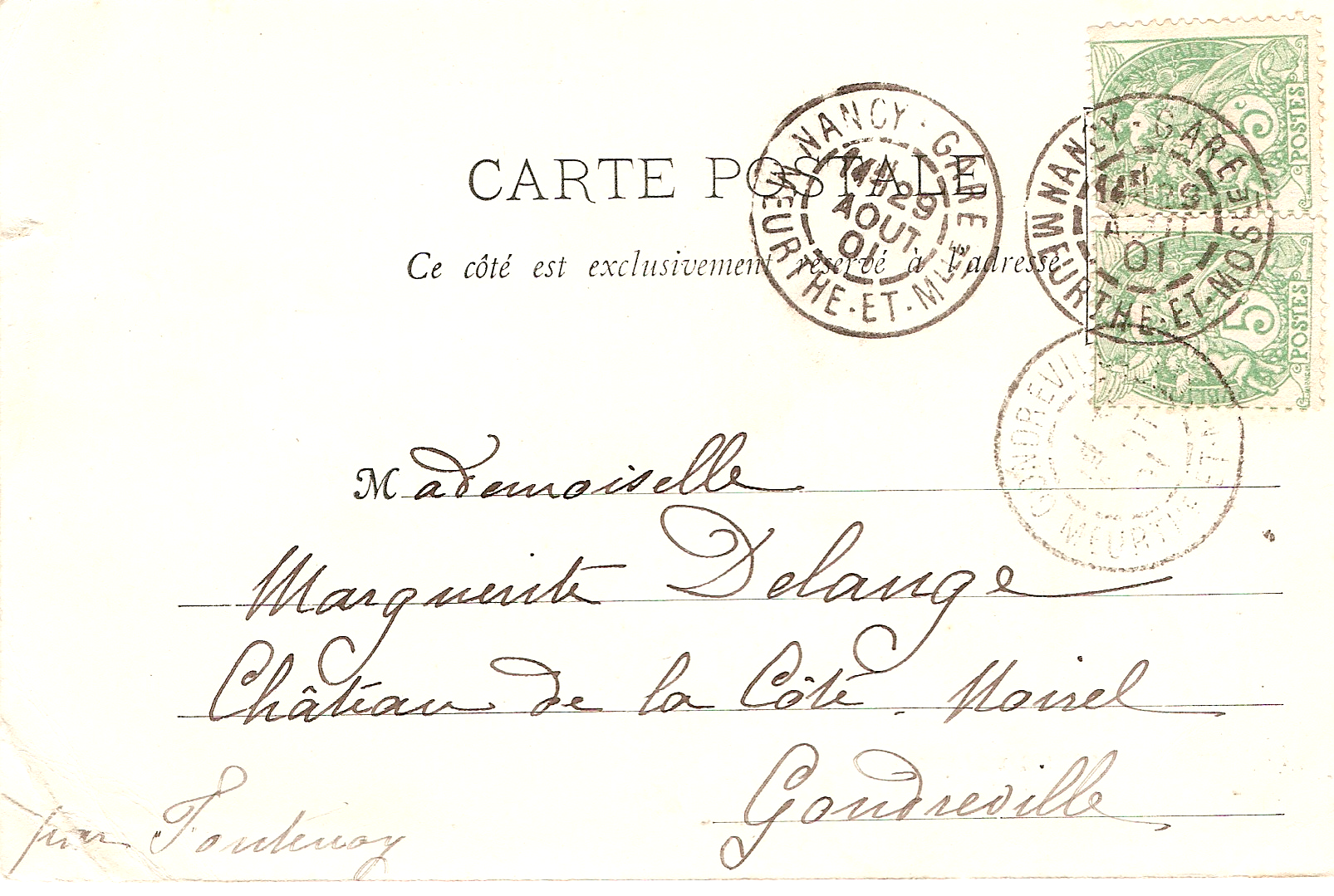
A 1901 cancellation made by a Daguin machine in Nancy.

From 1884 to a permanent change of the datestamps in 1949, the Daguin cancellation has four distinctive signs.

First, the centers of two datestamps are 28 millimeters away from one another. A great alteration of the stamp carriers, like in 1949, could only change this distance.

Secondly, a rotation around the carrier axis is always visible on a Daguin cancellation.

Thirdly, the outer crown with the place of cancellation was engraved differently from the date block placed at the center. The latter is made to be updated every day, more in case of multiple clears in a day. The crown lasted longer and its mark evolved with time. Moreover, the two datestamps' elements were of different ages and uses: they are different from one another in the case of a Daguin cancellation.

Finally, as the machine worn out, a little mark appeared at 35 millimeters from the center of each datestamp. When up the inking roll went too far and put ink on the touching piston. When going down, the piston, that was at 35 millimeters from the datestamps' centers, touched the mail and deposed a blur of ink.

In the first years of service, the datestamp was of the 84 type, appeared in 1884 with the Daguin machine, hence the name. This stamp crown's inner line is discontinuous because Daguin advised to lower the weight supported by the stamp carrier.

In 1949, and a final obligation in September of that year, the postal administration imposed bigger datestamps than before. The Daguin machine's stamp carrier was modified: the commercial stamp was moved on the side to let room for the new datestamp. The new center distance was 30 millimeters and the commercial stamp always on the left side of the cancellation (it can be right or left depending on how the postal clerk put the stamps on the carrier).

== Career ==
=== An active career ===
Between June 1884 and the first years of the 20th century, the Daguin machine was a success in French post offices. But, it was replaced in towns because of the competition with new electric cancelling machines. They were faster and the mail was moved mechanically.

As the replacement of the datestamps was easy, a new period of use began in 1923 when Paul Laffont, State Secretary to Posts and Telegraphs, authorized post offices to put a commercial stamp instead of the second datestamp. Were permitted text messages promoting touristic towns or postal services.

The last deliveries of Daguin machines took place in 1930. 500 machines were bought this final year of production, the same number as in 1884, first year of service.

=== The end ===
But, the competition with electrical cancelling machine won when large and pictorial cancellations when Daguin commercial marks were text only. In the 1950s the last Daguin machines lasted in small post offices. For these, the PTT ordered a thousand Secap H in April 1952 and another thousand of Secap BB in 1960. Contracts for Daguin commercial cancellation were ordered not to be renewed and replaced with undulated lines. Finally, all commercial printed by Daguin machine were forbidden in 1957.

A PTT internal note of March 1962 told to departmental directors that a post office must be considered without a cancelling machine if it possessed only a Daguin machine. Exceptions were individually authorized to soon-to-be retired postal clerk.

=== Tribute ===
On 18 March 1985, the French post issued a stamp in tribute to the Daguin machine in the Day of Stamp annual series.

=== Outside France ===
Daguin machines were ordered by foreign postal administrations. Their cancellations had the same distinctive appearance than those of French machine between 1884 and 1949.

In Romania, six post offices possessed a Daguin machine between 1890 and 1904: Brăila, Bucharest, Focşani, Galaţi, Iaşi and Ploieşti. A postal stationery was issued for the international stamp show Bucharest 2005 picturing Eugène Daguin and his machine.

== Philatelic studies ==
Yvon Nouazé estimated in 2006 that philatelists and marcophilists did not study or even know the Daguin cancellations before 1946. The oldest text he found was entitled "A philatelic enigma: the strange cancellations of Toulouse on Sage series 'N under U'".

During the 1950s, the topic passionated a growing group of collectors after Louis Goubin published an article about "the problem of the gemini marks in France from 1984 to our days".

The number of specialized studies about the Daguin machines and cancellations came to Roger Perrayon's "The Daguin again!" article in which he revealed the blur put by the touching piston.

In 1992, Émile Barthélémy created the "one-eyed Dagion" (Daguin borgne) when a sole datestamp was used. The cancellation can be identified thank to the touching piston mark.

== Collection ==
The cancellations made with a Daguin machine are a specialized philatelic topic on their own : trials, first and last use in particular post offices or département, changes and modifications of the datestamps or the commercial stamp, very last cancellations found, etc.

Some philatelists studied the use of Daguin machine outside France.

The Daguin commercial cancellations made between 1923 and 1957 has been helping the topical stamp collectors of French local subjects.

== Sources and references ==
- Nouazé, Yvon (2006). L'Oblitération mécanique en France. Fédération française des associations philatéliques (FFAP). Pages 51–64.
