= Postage stamps and postal history of Nevis =

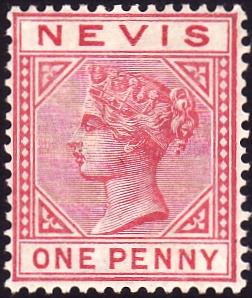
An 1884 one penny stamp of Nevis

Nevis, a British colony in the Leeward Islands, began issuing stamps in 1861.

== First stamps ==
The first stamps depicted the seal of the colony showing women at a medicinal spring. Issues from 1879 featured the portrait of Queen Victoria.

Between 1890 and 1903 it used the stamps of Leeward Islands. Between 1903 and June 1980 it used the stamps of St. Kitts and Nevis (St. Christopher Nevis Anguilla from 1952), concurrently with the issues of the Leeward Islands until 1956.

Although Nevis is part of St. Kitts and Nevis, in June 1980 a separate postal administration was established on the island and it began producing its own sets of stamps.

== See also ==
- Postage stamps and postal history of the Leeward Islands
- Postage stamps and postal history of Saint Kitts and Nevis
