= Ship cover =

Post sent on ships

In philately, a ship cover is a cover that was mailed aboard a ship, while a naval cover is one posted on a navy vessel. Shipboard postal facilities are ubiquitous on ships of any size, although the "post office" may consist only of an alcove and a sailor working it part-time.

Ship covers usually carry a paquebot postmark and/or a postmark unique to the vessel. Collectors of ship covers will look for different types used at different periods, as well as for covers indicating routing through particular ports, and so forth.

The Universal Ship Cancellation Society, founded in 1932, specializes in the study of naval covers, particularly those of the US Navy.

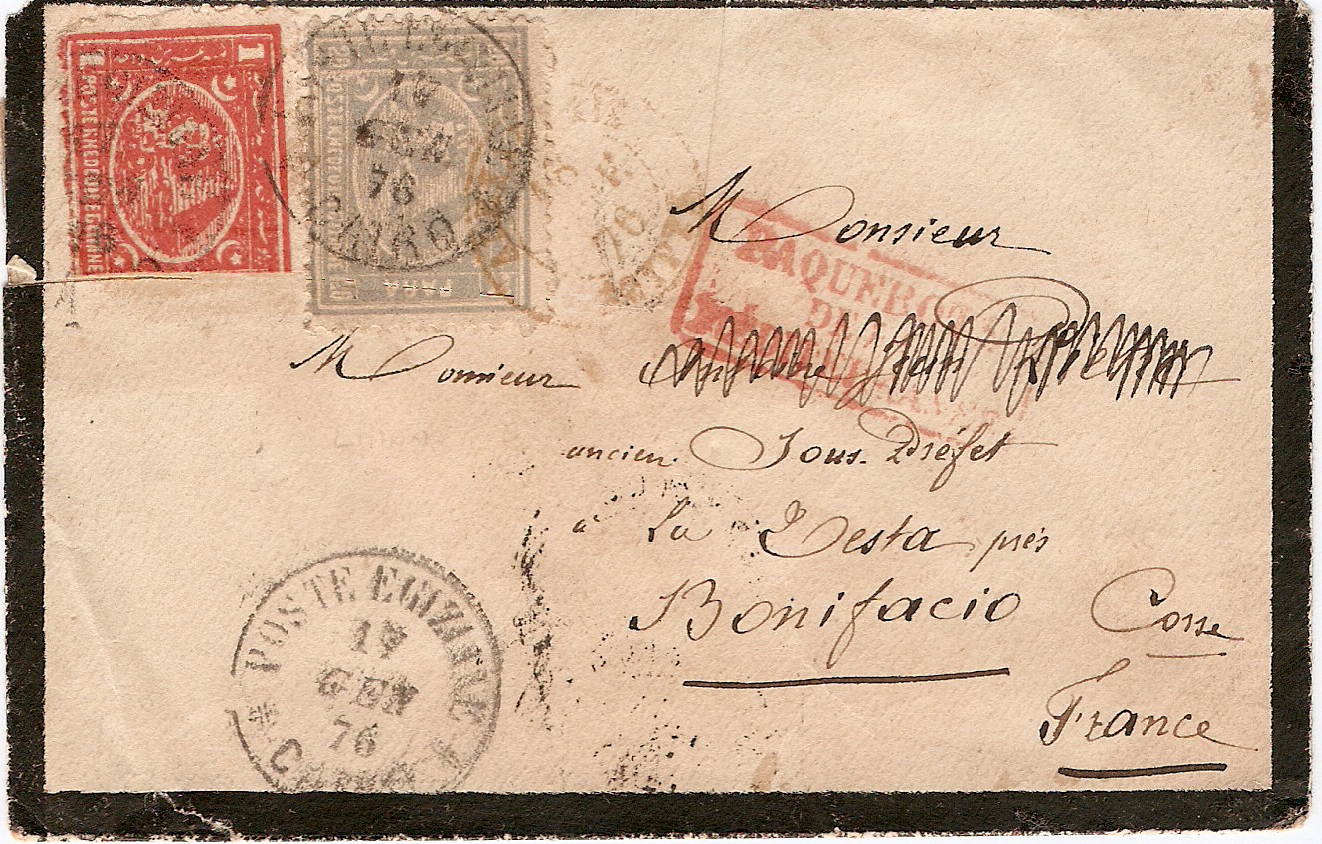
Egypt 1876, ship cover showing red boxed 'Paquebot' postmark

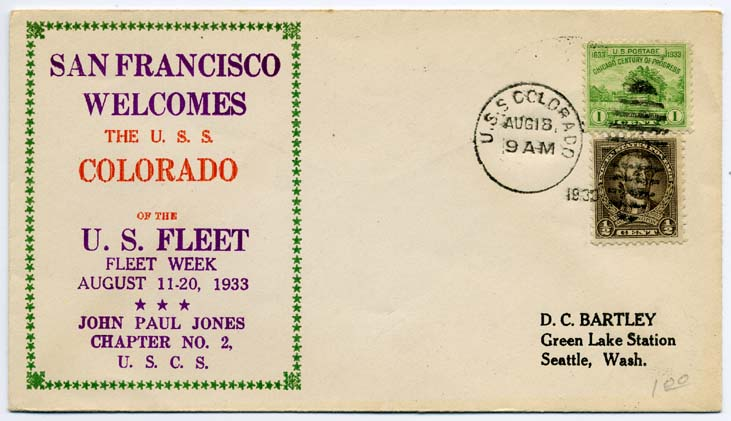
US 1933, cacheted naval cover postmarked on the battleship USS Colorado (BB-45) during Fleet Week, August 1933. Stamps are the Century of Progress issued several months earlier, and a 1/2c Washington Bicentennial from 1932.

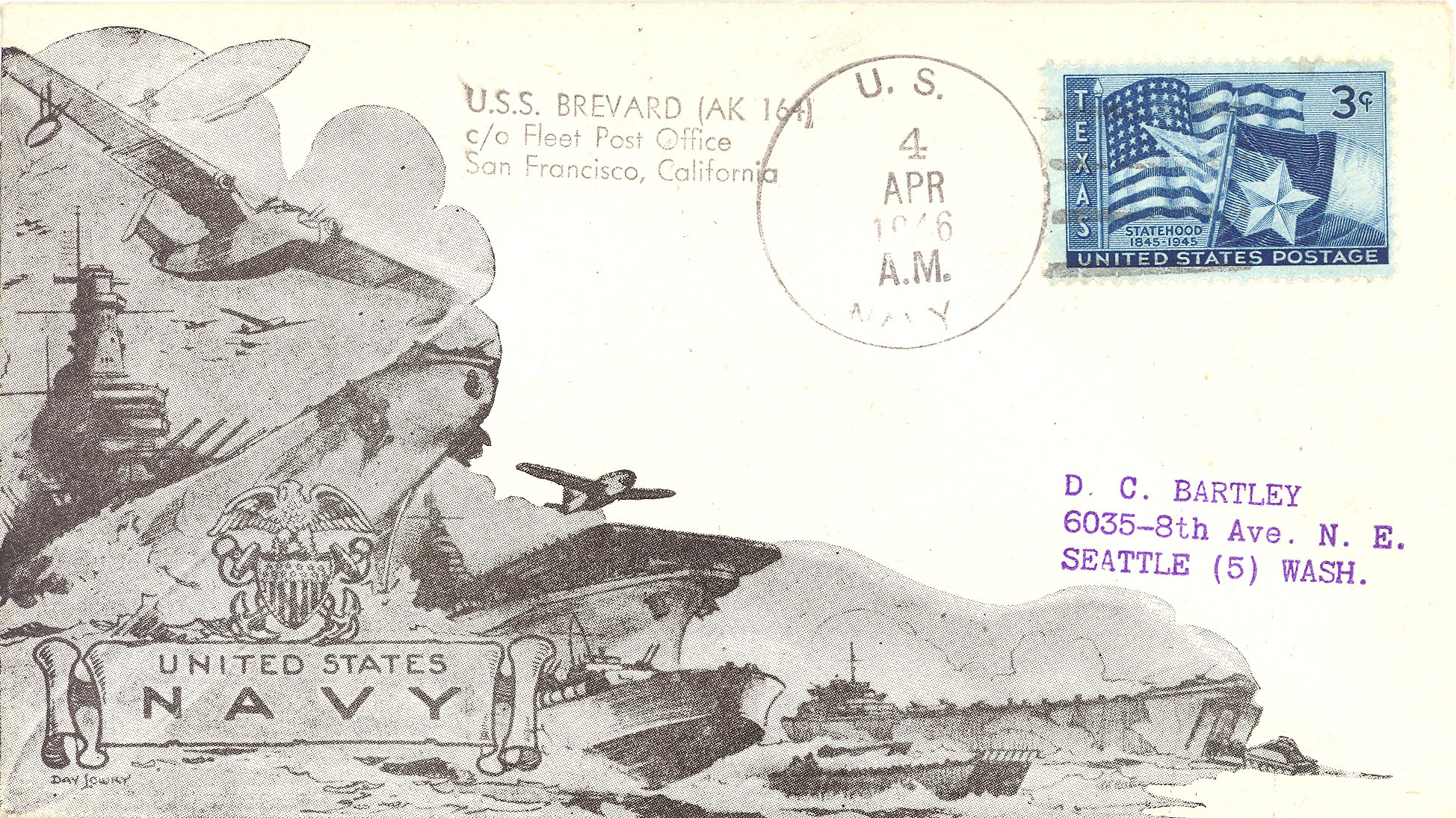
US 1946, cacheted naval cover postmarked on the cargo ship USS Brevard (AK-164)

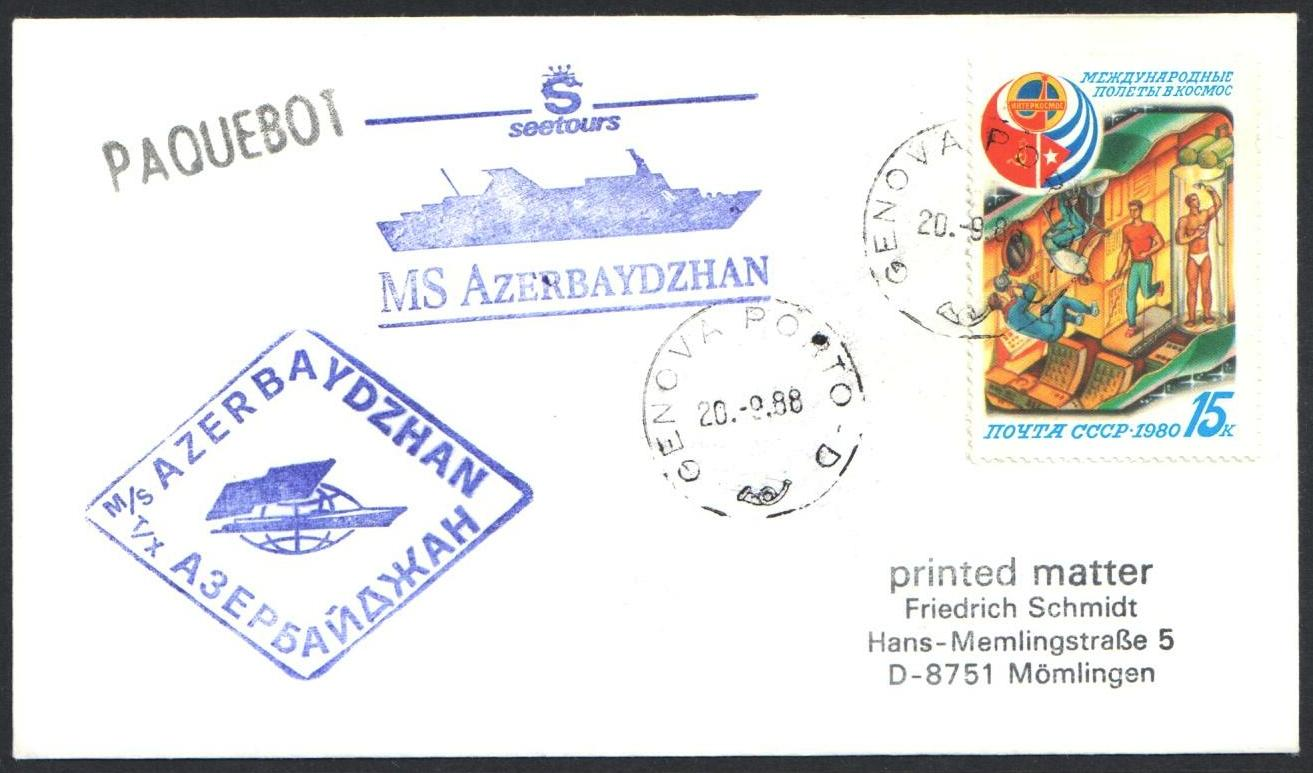
USSR 1988, ship cover posted from high seas aboard the MS Azerbaydzhan, showing paquebot and vessel postmark

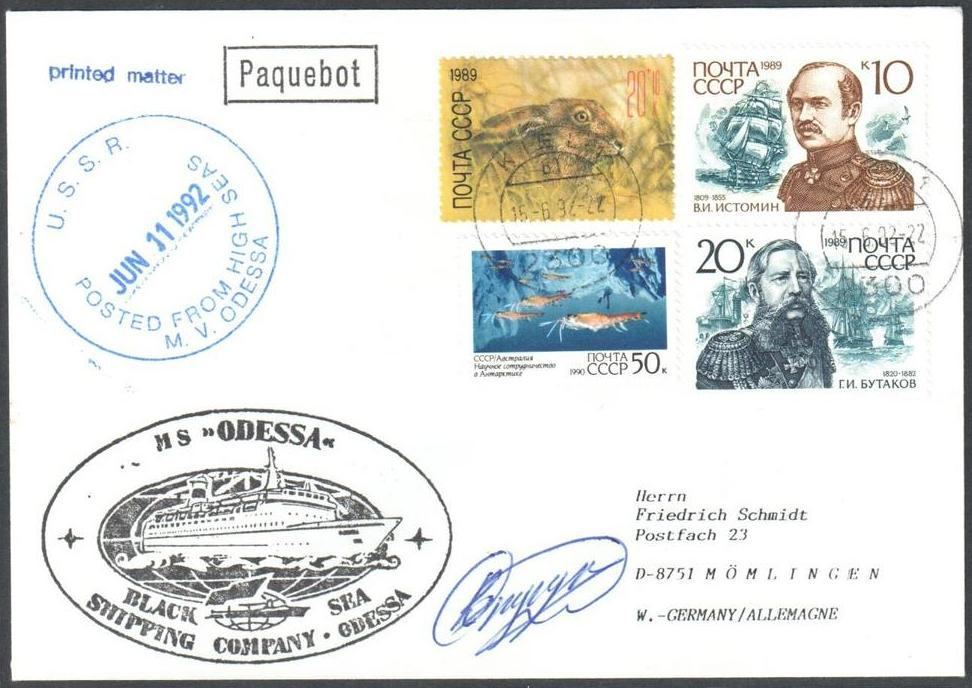
Russia 1992, ship cover posted from high seas aboard the M.S. Odessa, showing paquebot and vessel postmark
