= Postage stamps and postal history of Ecuador =

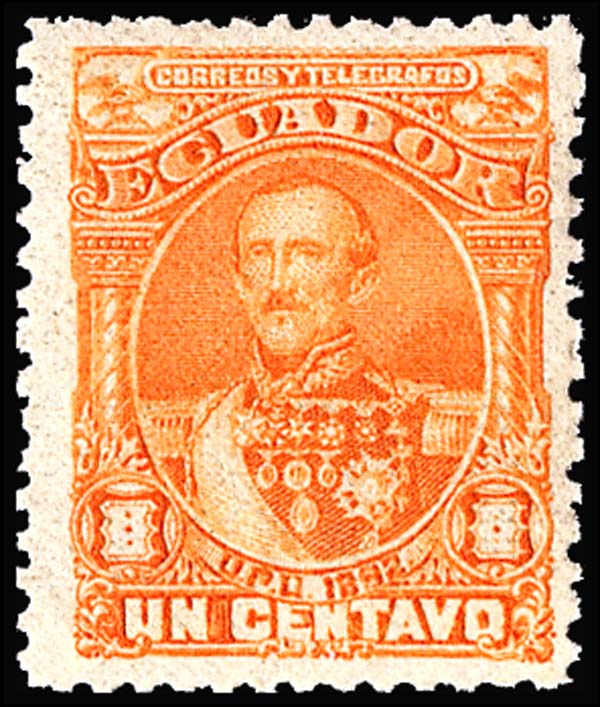
An 1890 stamp of Ecuador

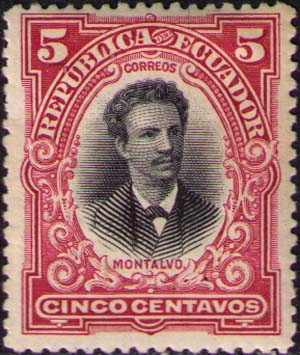
An 1899 stamp of Ecuador

This is a survey of the postage stamps and postal history of Ecuador.

Ecuador is a republic in South America, bordered by Colombia on the north, Peru on the east and south, and by the Pacific Ocean to the west. The country also includes the Galápagos Islands in the Pacific, about 1,000 kilometres (620 mi) west of the mainland.

== First stamps ==
The first stamps of Ecuador were issued on 1 January 1865.
