= Postage stamps and postal history of Saint Lucia =

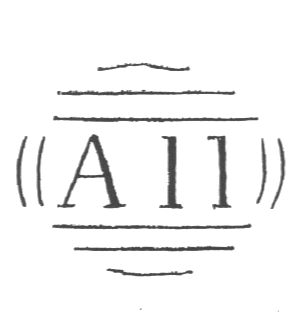
The St. Lucia "A11" canceller of 1858

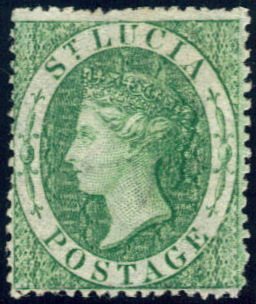
The St. Lucia 1860 green stamp

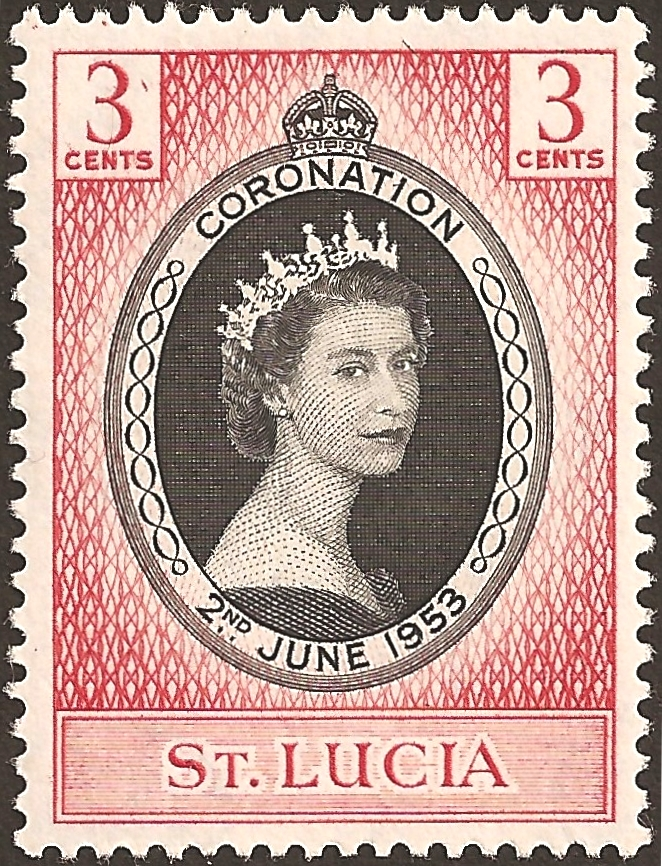
A 1953 stamp of St. Lucia

St. Lucia a former British dependency in the Windward Islands began using stamps in 1860. It achieved Associated Statehood on 1 March 1967. In 1979, it gained independence.

== The British stamp period ==
Letters to the United Kingdom from St. Lucia had to be prepaid from 1 April 1858. British stamps were authorised for use in St Lucia and this information was conveyed to the Colonial Postmaster by Rowland Hill. Supplies for 2 months consumption (£50) were sent out on about 16 April 1858 consisting of 1d, 4d & 6d stamps along with an obliterating tool marked "A11".

Further supplies of stamps may have been sent out later, but no records exist of the numbers involved, they may have included 2d and 1s values. The numbers are likely to have been small as at this time it is probable that only about 200 people on the island could read or write.

== Early cancellations and obliterators ==
Obliterators were sent to the island from Great Britain with the designator "A11" to coincide with the dispatch of British Stamps to the colony (see above). The first was sent on 16 April 1858 with the first recorded use on 28 August that year.

== The first stamps ==
The first stamps issued by St. Lucia were put on sale in 1860 and consisted of three duties (1d, 4d and 6d). The stamps were printed by Perkins Bacon Ltd using the line-engraved process. To save the colony money, only one plate was engraved, with the duties identified by the colour of the stamps, red for 1d, blue for 4d and green for 6d.

The die for the first stamps was finished on 16 October 1860 and used the Queen Victoria head engraved for them in May by C. H. Jeens for use on the 9d duty of South Australia. Jeens was paid £2 12s 6d for the drawing and £9 9s for the engraving. A vertical oval big enough for the head was cleared in the engraved background. This was surrounded by a plain band with "ST. LUCIA" and "POSTAGE". The design is considered to be one of Perkins Bacon's most elegant.

Thirty six sheets were printed in red (8640 stamps), 13 sheets in blue (3120 stamps) and 17 sheets in green (4080 stamps). These sheets were dispatched to the island by packet on 17 November 1860. The stamps were printed on paper produced by Rush Mills at Northampton and under the control of Stacey Wise. The paper was watermarked by a small six pointed star as well as around the margin with "POSTAGE" twice at the sides and once at the top and bottom, the spaces between being filled by five parallel lines.

The stamps were printed by a Mr. Dix on 10 November, and perforated by a Miss Stewart on 14 November. The perforation needles were set to 14 to 16 and often became clogged giving rough perforations.

The first issue of these stamps was made on 18 December 1860 and details were printed in the Island Gazette for the 19th with stamps in red for sale at a price of one penny, blue at four pence and green at six pence.

== St. Lucia Steam Conveyance Co. Ltd. ==
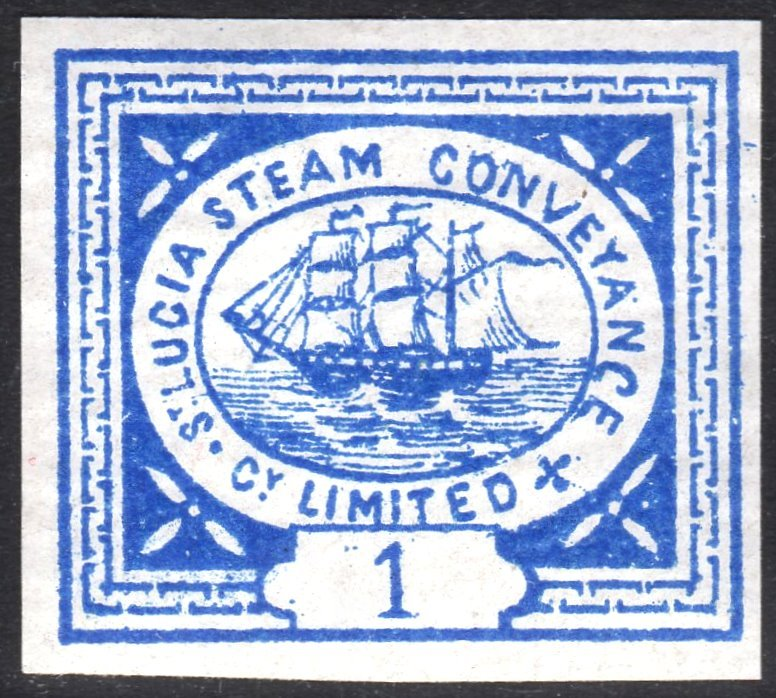
A 1 penny stamp of the St. Lucia Steam Conveyance Company Limited, c. 1872, from the second printing

This company carried mail by sea from Castries to the coastal villages of St. Lucia. Stamps were issued from around 1871 to 1872 when the company went out of business. A possibly provisional stamp is illustrated in the book by Hurt and Williams which was followed by the issue of several values depicting a steamship in an oval frame. There are a number of different printings of the stamps which may be distinguished by paper and gum variations.
