= Postage stamps and postal history of the Dominican Republic =

The Dominican Republic became independent from Spain in 1865 and produced its own stamps from that date.

== Gallery of stamps of the Dominican Republic ==
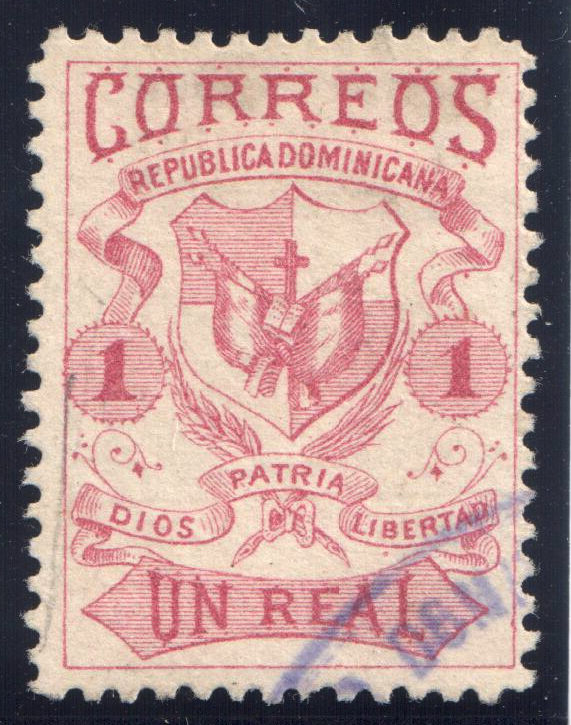
1879 issue

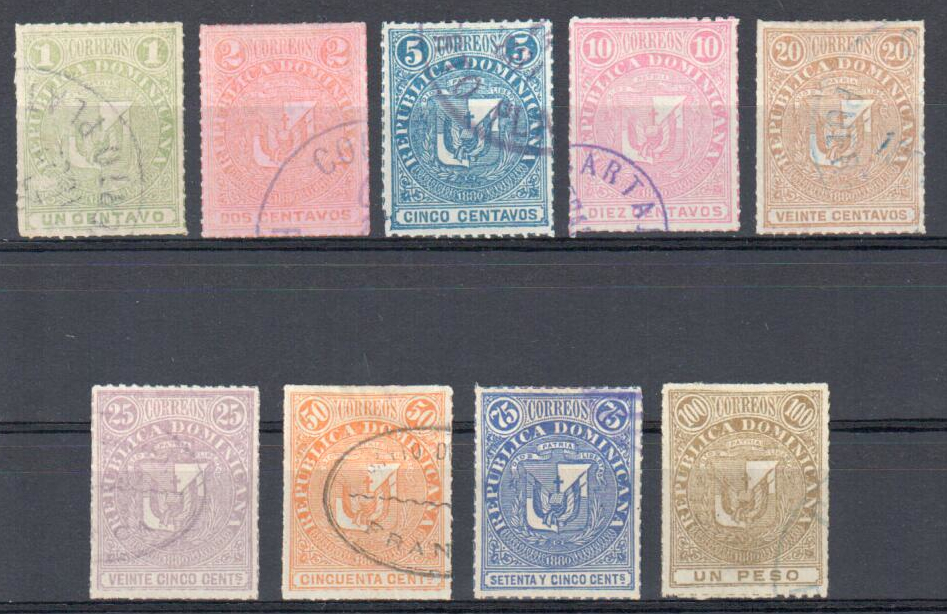
1880 set

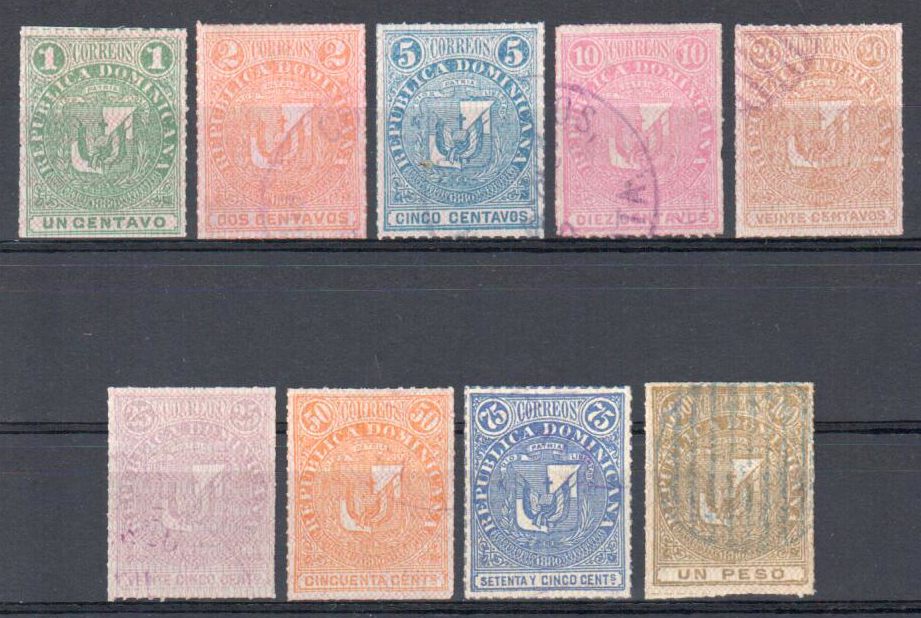
1881 set

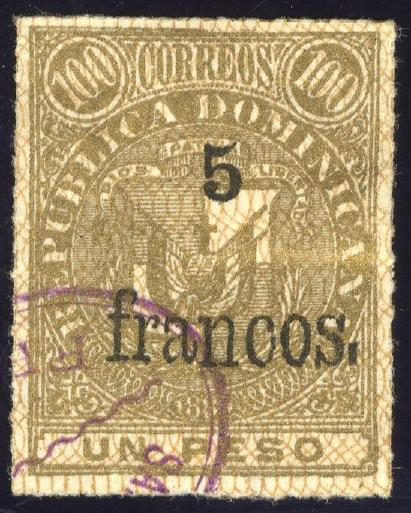
1883 issue

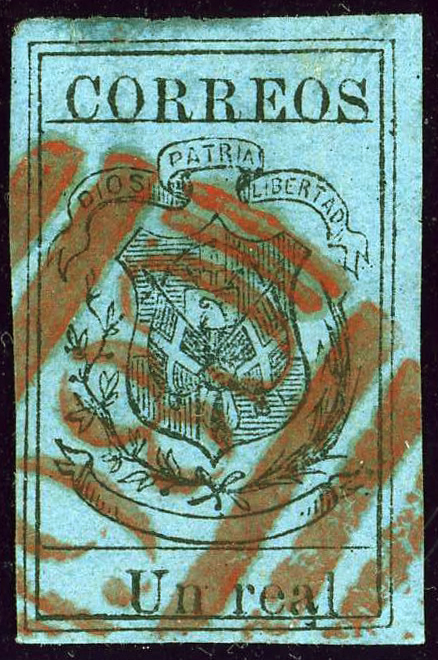
An early 1866 stamp with a British office cancel

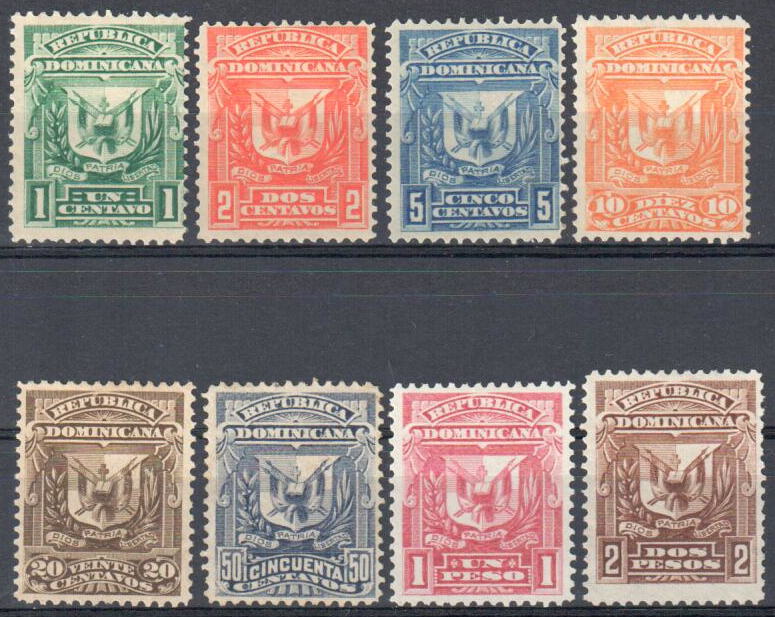
1885–1891 set

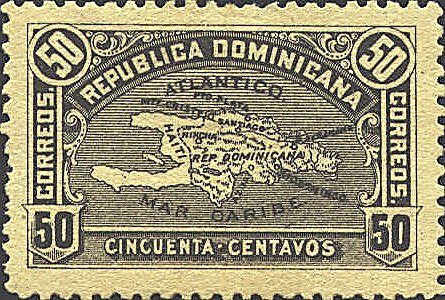
A 1900 stamp with approximate map

== See also ==
- Postage stamps and postal history of Haiti
