= Postage stamps and postal history of Haiti =

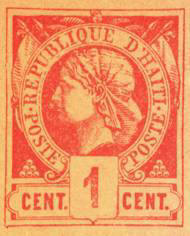
The first stamp of Haiti, 1881, showing the head of Liberty

This is a survey of the postage stamps and postal history of Haiti.

Haiti is a Caribbean country which occupies the western part of the island of Hispaniola, which it shares with the Dominican Republic to the east.

== First stamps ==
The first stamp of Haiti was issued in 1881 in the 1c value. It showed the head of Liberty.

== See also ==
- Postage stamps and postal history of the Dominican Republic
