= Universal Ship Cancellation Society =

International non-profit organization

- Abbreviation: USCS
- Formation: 1932; 94 years ago
- Type: 501(c)(3) non-profit
- Location: United States
- Field: Philately
- President: Laurie Bernstein
- Vice president: Nancy Clark
- Publication: USCS Log
- Website: uscs.org

The Universal Ship Cancellation Society (USCS) is an international philatelic non-profit organization with an interest in postmarks and covers from all maritime services.

== Overview ==
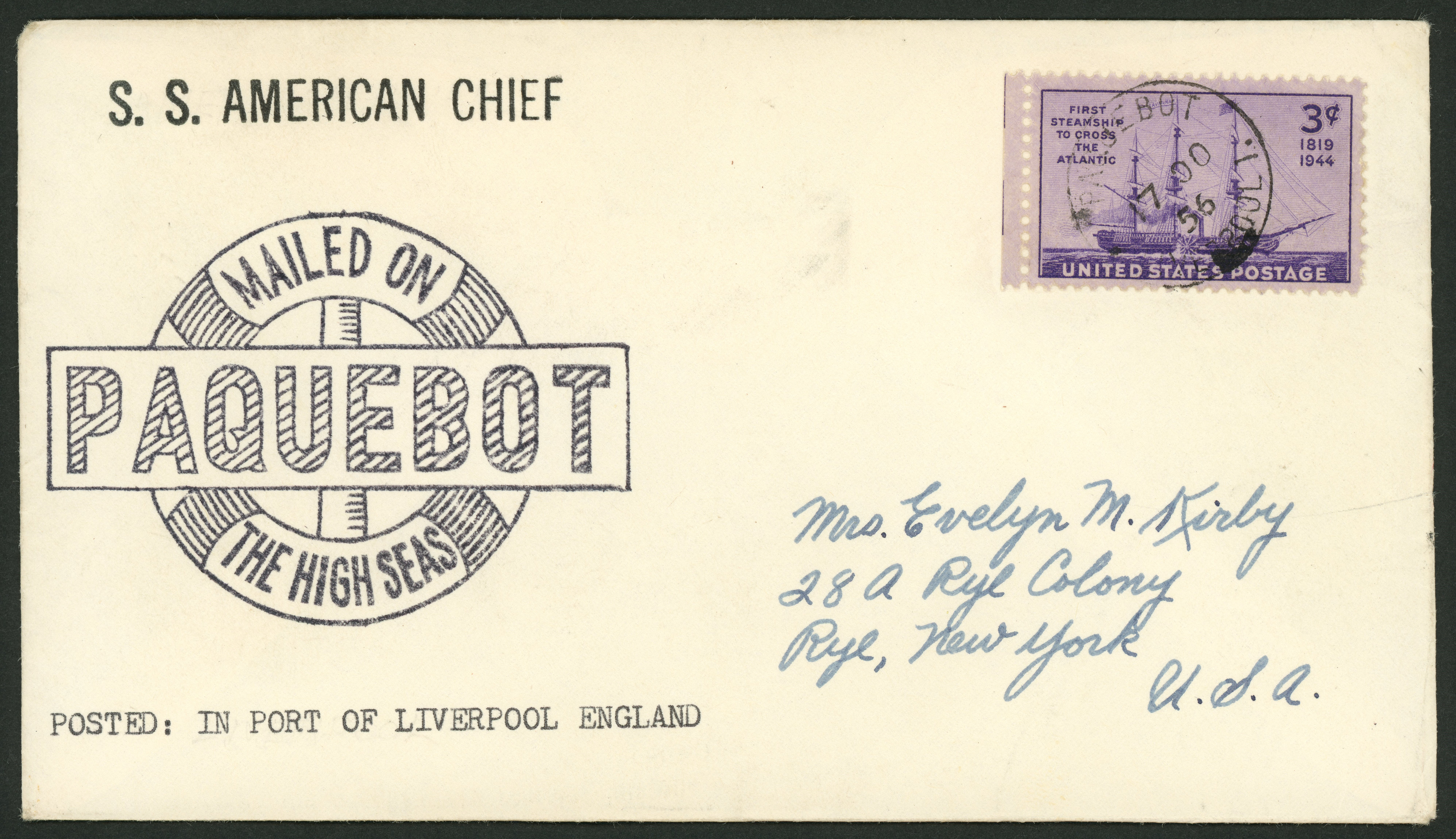
Paquebot example—mail carried by ships outside of regular postal service

Founded in 1932, the USCS is one of the oldest specialized postal history societies in the world and the only organization in the United States devoted to navy and maritime covers. The USCS held its first national convention in August 1940, in Los Angeles.

As of 2008, the USCS consisted of about 1,300 members worldwide. Members' interests includes topics such as: navy ships of all countries, merchant ships with seapost and paquebot markings, the Marine Corps and the Coast Guard, navy bases, related cachets, postcards, patches, photographs and other navy memorabilia.

The USCS holds annual conventions in various cities throughout the United States and has local chapters in many cities in the United States and Europe. The USCS also uses study units formed by members to research specialized interests and maintains a photograph library with over 3,000 negatives of ships.

== Publications ==
The USCS publishes the following:

- USCS Log (ISSN 0279-6139). Monthly 32-page journal with articles of lasting interest on Navy, Coast Guard, Marine Corps, and other maritime covers; and historical articles of various U.S. and foreign ships.
- USCS Handbook. Contains basic information for collectors, including a postmark primer, naval terms dictionary, hull classifications, and the society history.
- Catalog of United States Naval Postmarks. A reference of nearly a century of postal history.
- Naval Cover Cachet Makers’ Catalog. A reference volume of sponsors and cachet artists with illustrations and summary information on the people involved.
- Data Sheets. Compilations of historical interest, events and operations.
