= Postage stamps and postal history of Saint Kitts and Nevis =

Saint Kitts and Nevis is an island country in the Leeward Islands, consisting of the islands of Saint Kitts and Nevis. In 1883, St. Kitts, Nevis and Anguilla were united into one colony. Anguilla formally separated from the union in 1980.

== First stamps ==
The first stamps for Nevis were issued in 1861. The first stamps for Saint Kitts, inscribed Saint Christopher, were issued in 1870.

== General issues ==
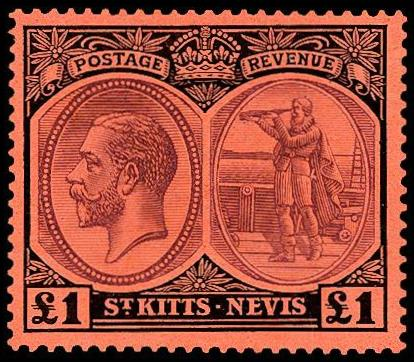
A £1 stamp styled St. Kitts-Nevis, 1920

Between 1890 and 1903, stamps of the Leeward Islands were used on the islands.

Saint Kitts and Nevis started issuing stamps in 1903. These were used concurrently with the stamps of the Leeward Islands until July 1, 1956. Starting in 1952, stamps were inscribed St. Christopher Nevis and Anguilla.

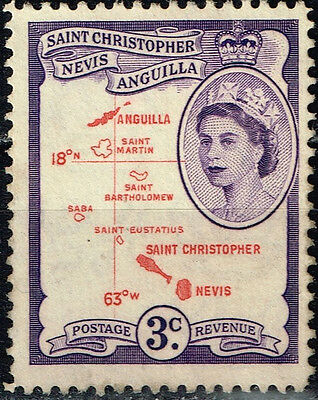
A 1956 stamp inscribed St. Christopher Nevis and Anguilla

On February 27, 1967, St. Christopher–Nevis–Anguilla achieved Associated Statehood. However, Anguilla proclaimed independence from Saint Kitts and Nevis in July of the same year, and began issuing its own stamps.

Stamps inscribed St. Christopher Nevis and Anguilla were issued for Saint Kitts and Nevis until 1980.

== Separate issues ==
On June 23, 1980, separate postal administrations were established, one for Saint Kitts, the other for Nevis and different stamps were produced for each. Saint Kitts and Nevis continue to issue separate stamps after independence from the United Kingdom in 1983.

== See also ==
- Postage stamps and postal history of the Leeward Islands
- Postage stamps and postal history of Nevis
- Postage stamps and postal history of Anguilla
