= Postage stamps and postal history of Venezuela =

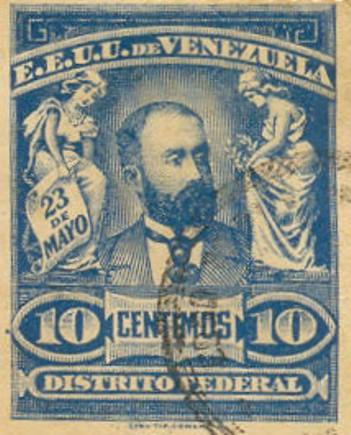
A used 1905 stamp of Venezuela

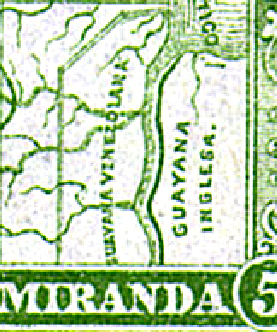
An 1896 Venezuelan postage stamp with a map showing Guyana up to the east bank of the Essequibo River as "Guayana Venezolana"

This is a survey of the postage stamps and postal history of Venezuela. Venezuela is a country on the northern coast of South America. It is a continental mainland with numerous islands located off its coastline in the Caribbean Sea. The republic is a former Spanish colony, that won its independence in 1821.

== First stamps ==
The first stamps of the Venezuela were issued on 1 January 1859.

Venezuela supported its territorial claim in the Venezuela Crisis of 1895 by printing an 1896 postage stamp with a map showing Guyana up to the east bank of the Essequibo River as "Guayana Venezolana". Guyana years later responded with a series of overprints “ESSEQUIBO IS OURS”.

== British stamps ==
British stamps were used at La Guaira between 1865 and 1880 which may be identified by the cancel C60. British stamps used at Ciudad Bolivar (1868–1880) had the cancel D22.

== See also ==
- IPOSTEL
