= Postage stamps and postal history of Puerto Rico =

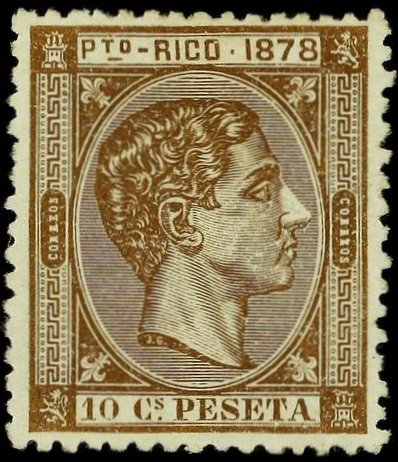
An 1878 stamp of Puerto Rico with King Alfonso XII

The postal history of Puerto Rico began around 1518, at least for official mail, when Spain adopted general postal regulations; although the first documentation of Spanish postal regulations specific to the Caribbean was 1794. The first postage stamps were issued 170 years ago for Puerto Rico and Cuba in 1856. Postage stamps just for Puerto Rico followed, and later postal cards and telegraph stamps were issued. United States postal administration began in 1899 and the last stamps specifically for Puerto Rico were issued in 1900. They were superseded by U.S. stamps, which are still used today on the island as it remains a territory serviced by the United States Postal Service (USPS).

Puerto Rican stamps have, as one might safely assume, featured matters related to Puerto Rico such as its places, events, works, and personalities.

== First stamps and postal stationery ==
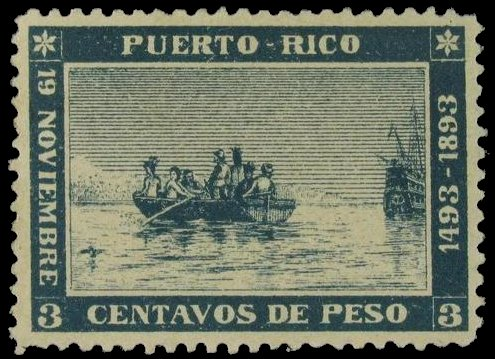
Columbus arrival to Puerto Rico, Spanish 1893 issue

The first stamps used in Puerto Rico were issues for the Spanish West Indies, for use in both Cuba and Puerto Rico, but these were not generally used in Puerto Rico until 1856. The first stamps inscribed "Puerto Rico" were issued in 1873. Postal cards for Puerto Rico were printed in Spain and sent to their colonies in 1878.

Spanish commemorative postage stamp was issued on the occasion of the four hundredth anniversary of Columbus' arrival in Puerto Rico in 1493, issued in 1893 when the island was still under Spanish rule. It is the only colonial-era Puerto Rican stamp that does not bear the face of the King of Spain.

With the war of Spanish–American War, the United States invaded Puerto Rico and wrested power from the Spanish. For the first time, stamped envelopes became available to the residents of Puerto Rico.

== Telegraph stamps ==
From 1871 to 1881 a number of different telegraph stamps were issued for Puerto Rico. From 1882 postage stamps were used for telegraph fees which were usually cancelled with a punched hole. From 1886 to 1889 a number of stamps were issued for Puerto Rican municipalities marked TELEGRAFOS as part of the extension of the telegraph network to more towns. It is unclear if these were revenue stamps for a tax on telegrams or to pay the fee for sending a telegraphic message but at least twenty different areas are known to have issued the stamps.

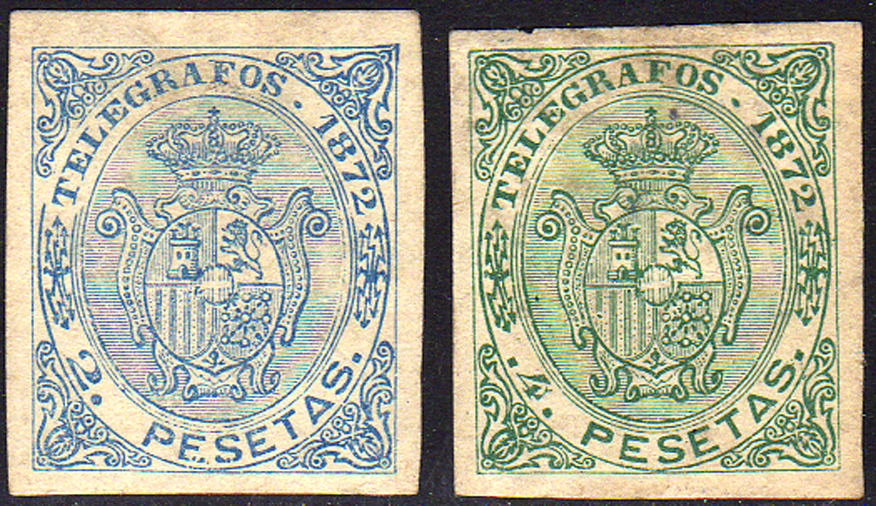
Telegraph stamps of Puerto Rico, 1872 issue

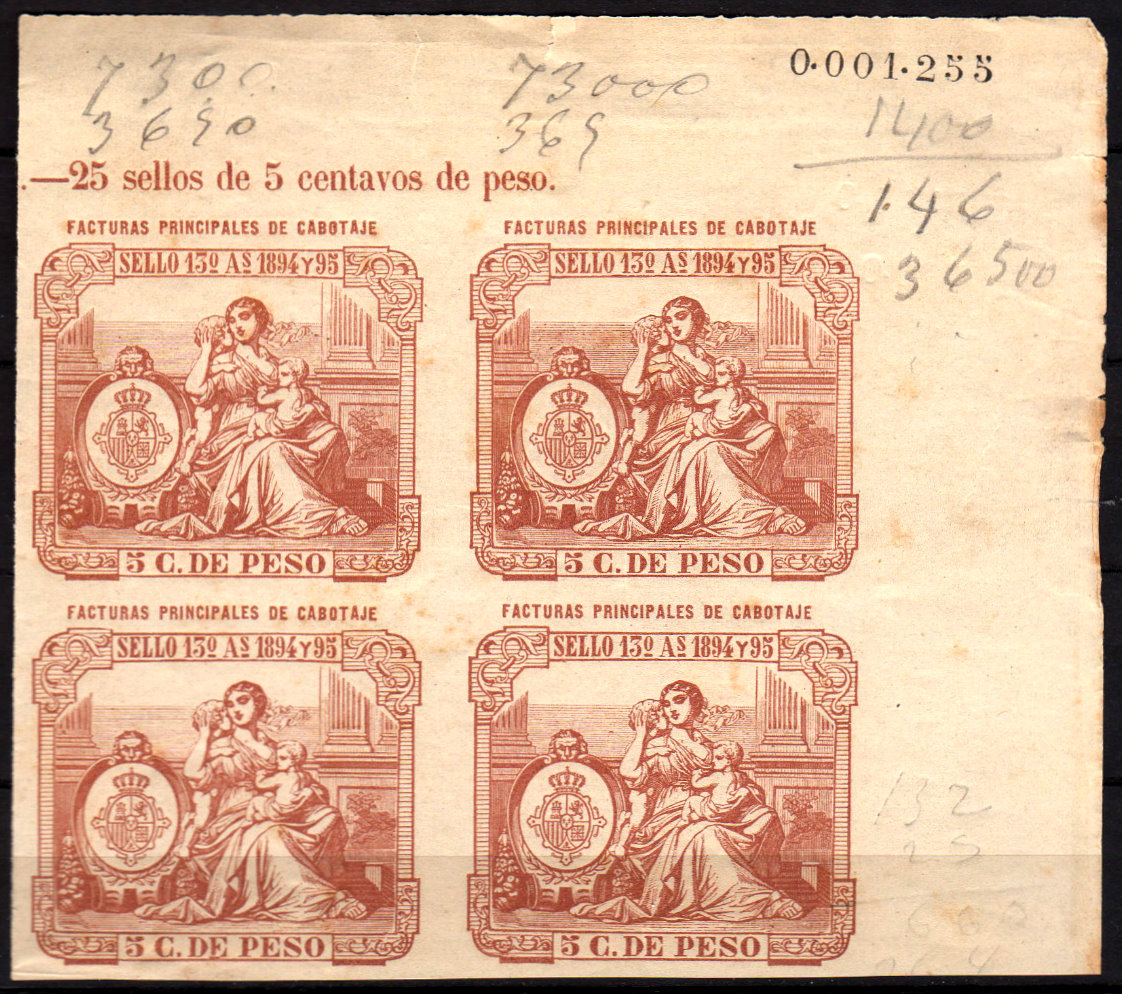
A corner block of four revenue stamps of Puerto Rico, 1894–95 issue

== United States stamps ==
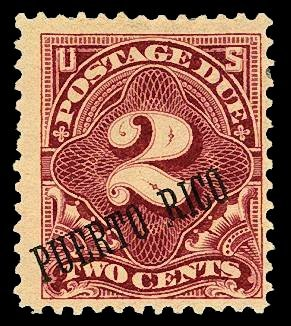
Postage due stamp issued in 1899

An independent postal service under U.S. authority was established March 15, 1899. But with the Foraker Act of 1900, the postal service of Puerto Rico ceased to be a separate adjunct of the U.S. and was assimilated into the United States postal system. Stamps were originally overprinted with the spelling Anglicized to "PORTO RICO". Later, postage dues, and in 1900 regular issues, were overprinted with "PUERTO RICO". Likewise, postal cards and stamped envelopes were also initially overprinted "PORTO RICO" and later "PUERTO RICO". U.S. stamps are now used on the island.

== See also ==
- Postage stamps and postal history of Cuba
- Puerto Rico on stamps
