= Postage stamps and postal history of Grenada =

This is a survey of the postage stamps and postal history of Grenada.

Grenada is an island country in the British Commonwealth consisting of the island of Grenada and six smaller islands at the southern end of the Grenadines in the southeastern Caribbean Sea. Grenada is located northwest of Trinidad and Tobago, northeast of Venezuela, and southwest of Saint Vincent and the Grenadines.

== First stamps ==
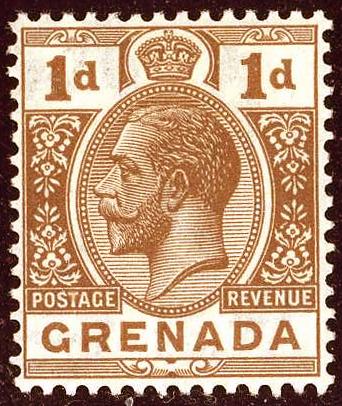
A 1923 stamp of Grenada

Beginning in 1858, the stamps of Great Britain were used in Grenada. Stamps posted in Grenada can be identified by the A15 oval postmark cancelled at St. George's.

The first stamps of Grenada depicting the portrait of Queen Victoria in the values of 1 penny (green) and 6 pence (rose) were issued on 3 June 1861.

== Later issues ==
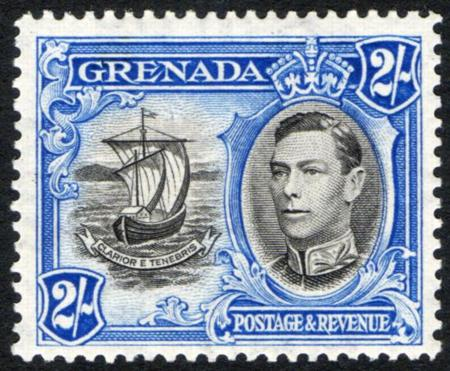
A 1938 stamp depicting the seal of the colony

The seal of the colony featuring La Concepción with the motto CLARIOR E TENEBRIS (Even clearer in the darkness) was depicted in the 1906 issue and later issues in 1934, 1938, 1951, and 1953.

== Independence ==
Independence was granted on February 7, 1974, and observed with stamps overprinted "Independence. 7th Feb. 1974".

Grenada ranks among countries that have issued the most stamps in the world.

== Local issues ==
Stamps inscribed "Grenada Grenadines" were issued from 1973 to 1999 for the islands of the Grenadines located to the north of Grenada. Since 1999, stamps for the Grenadines are marked "Grenada Carriacou & Petite Martinique".
