= E. Victor Toeg =

British solicitor and philatelist (1916–2010)

- Born: 2 February 1916; Shanghai, China
- Died: 28 July 2010 (aged 94)
- Occupation: Solicitor
- Known for: Philatelic collecting and writing
- Notable work: Dominica: Postal History, Stamps and Postal Stationery to 1935 (1994)

Ezekiel Victor Toeg FRPSL (2 February 1916 – 28 July 2010) was a British solicitor and philatelist who specialised in the postage stamps and postal history of the British West Indies (BWI) and Caribbean. His collection of Antigua won two gold medals at international stamp exhibitions and included a 1693 letter to London that was described in 1990 as the earliest known letter from the island. He wrote a book on the adhesive fees stamps of the Leeward Islands (1991) and completed a survey of the stamps and postal history of the island of Dominica to 1935 (1994). He was president of the British West Indies Study Circle (BWISC) from 1968 until his death in 2010.

== Early life and family ==
Ezekiel Toeg was born in Shanghai, China, on 2 February 1916. He was educated in England where he attended a preparatory school at Seaford, Sussex, and then Clifton College, Bristol. He studied law at Lincoln College, University of Oxford, and after graduation enlisted in the Royal Air Force. He failed to qualify as a pilot due to his height but served guarding Gibraltar from enemy attack during the Second World War.

He married Laetitia (Lettie) D. Lesser in Marylebone in 1947. They had a son, Nigel. Lettie Toeg died in 2003.

== Career ==
Toeg became a solicitor with the firm of J. Tickle & Co., of Holborn, London, ultimately becoming a partner there before retiring in 1978. He then became a stamp dealer with his wife, after which he was obliged to resign from the Royal Philatelic Society London, of which he had been a member since 1961, but which only accepted amateurs as members at that time.

== Philatelic collections ==
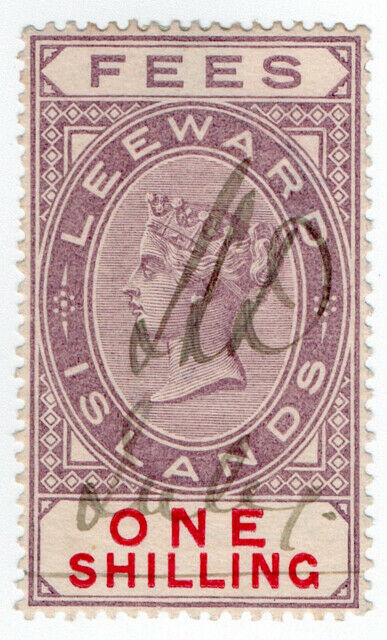
One shilling fees stamp of the Leeward Islands, 1882 issue.

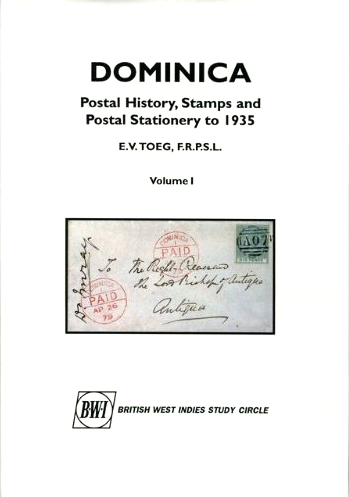
Dominica Postal History, Stamps and Postal Stationery to 1935 (1994)

Until 1966, Toeg collected the whole of the British West Indies but later sold parts of his collection in order to specialise. He sold his Leeward Islands collection at auction in 1971 and his Montserrat collection in 1983 and 1984 after which he specialised solely in the stamps and postal history of Antigua. His collection of that island won a gold medal at the London 1980 International Stamp Exhibition, and another gold at Stamp World London 1990 after which parts were sold at auction that year by Christie's Robson Lowe. The collection included a number of items from the Codrington Correspondence find and two of the earliest-known letters from Antigua bearing only a Bishop mark, one of which is a 1693 letter to William Moore in London that was described by the auctioneers as the earliest known letter from Antigua.

His writings include articles for society journals and the index of the first one hundred issues of the British West Indies Study Circle's Bulletin. He wrote a book on the adhesive fees stamps of the Leeward Islands (1991) which he complained had been largely ignored even by most collectors of those islands. When he decided to write the book, he didn't own any of the stamps and had to borrow Michael Medlicott's collection to use as source material.

He completed the work of Philip Saunders, the founder of the BWISC, and others in a survey of the postal history, stamps, and postal stationery of Dominica to 1935 that was published in 1994, the first book devoted to the philately of the island since Bertram W. H. Poole's monograph of c. 1909.

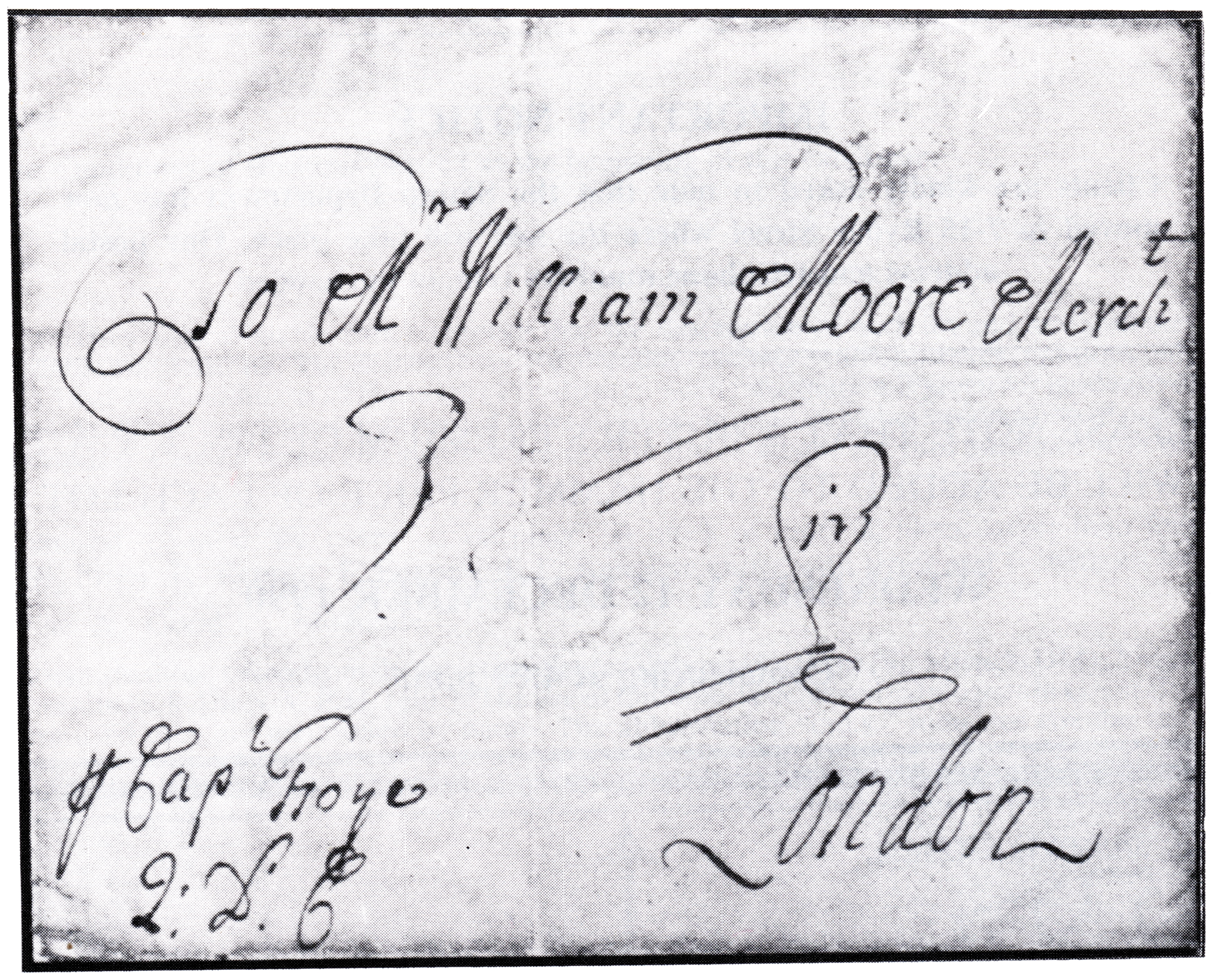
Front of 1693 letter to William Moore of London from Antigua, described when sold by Christie's Robson Lowe as the earliest known letter from the island.

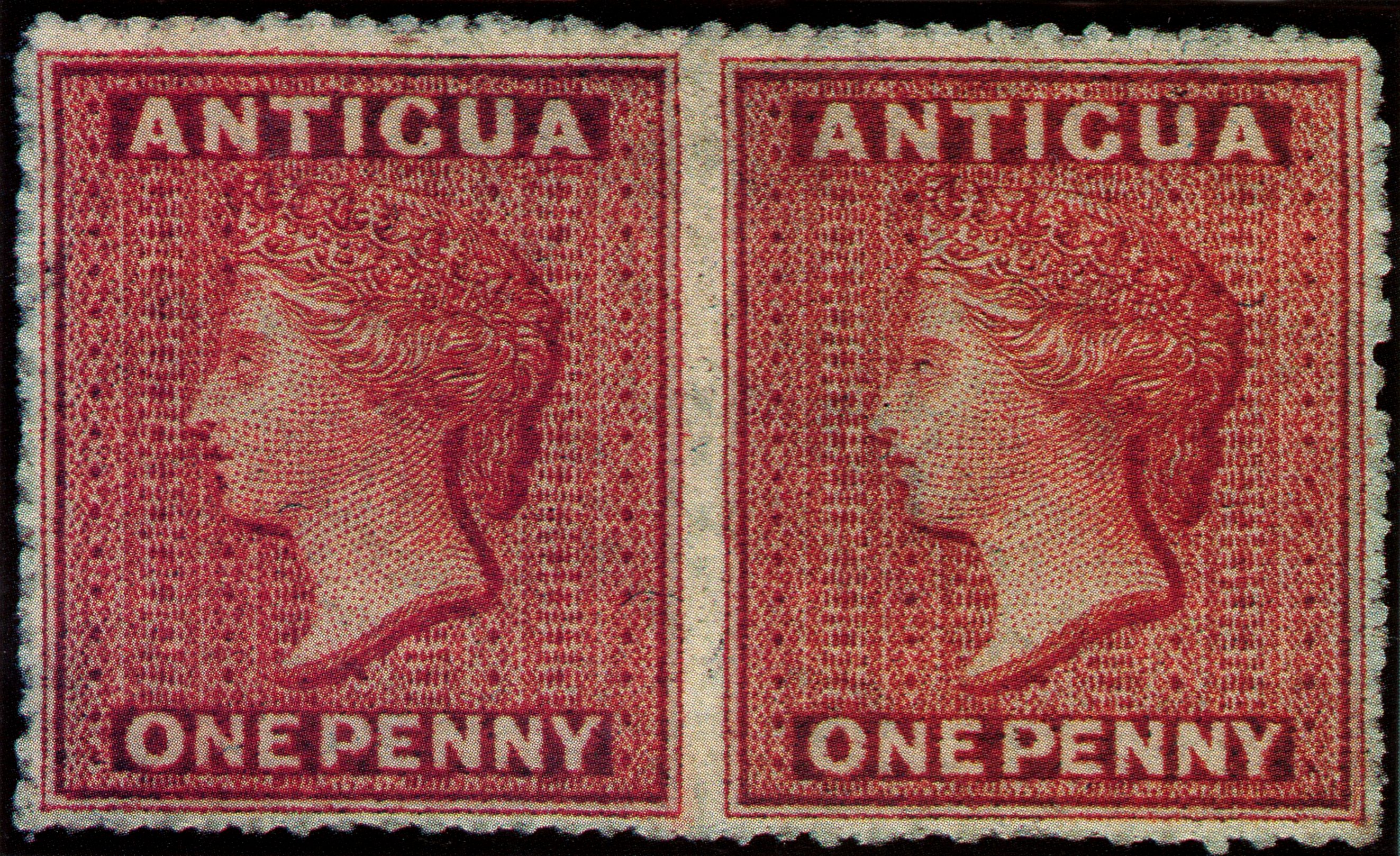
1867 one penny vermillion stamps of Antigua error imperforate between from the Toeg collection.

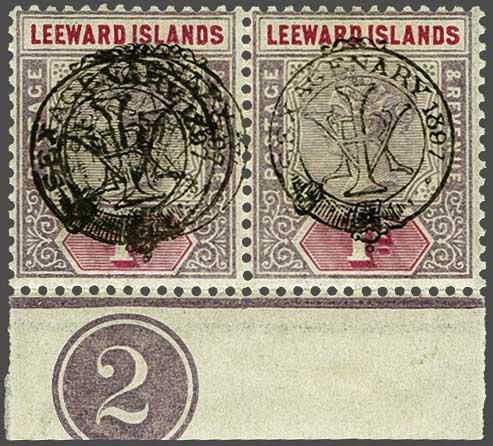
Leeward Islands stamp overprinted in 1897 to mark the diamond Jubilee of Queen Victoria with the overprint triple on the left hand stamp. Sold by Toeg in 1971.

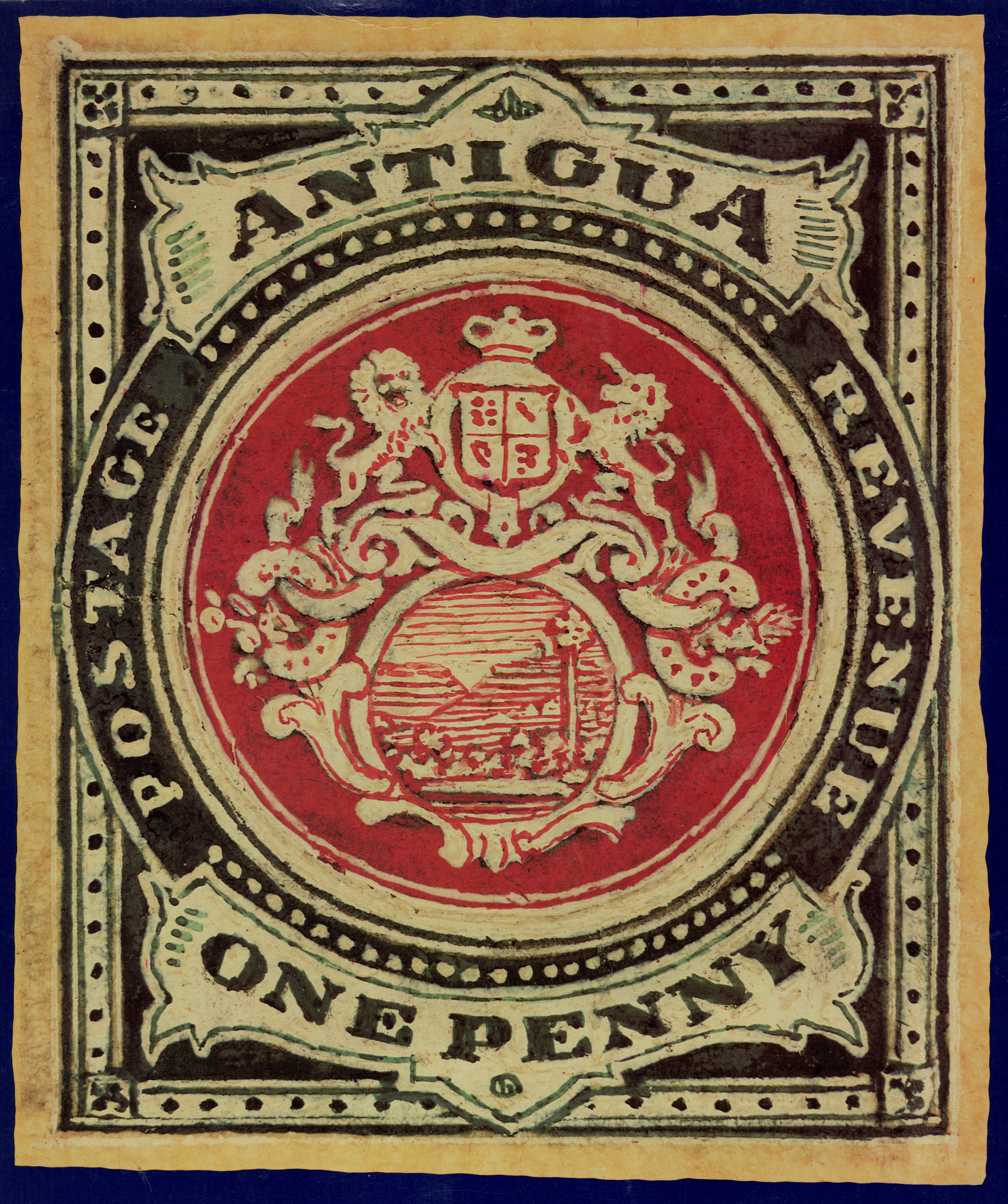
Hand-painted essay of the 1903 one penny stamp of Antigua from the Toeg Collection, sold by Christie's Robson Lowe in 1990.

== Organised philately ==
Toeg joined the British West Indies Study Circle in 1954 and was vice-president and then president from 1968 until his death in 2010. He was honorary president towards the end of that period after having heart surgery in 1995 following which the position of chairman and president were separated to reduce the strain on his health.

He was elected a member of the Royal Philatelic Society London in 1961, and a fellow in 1967. He resigned on becoming a stamp dealer with his wife but was reinstated after ceasing in business.

== Death ==
E. Victor Toeg died on 28 July 2010. He received an obituary in the Bulletin of the BWISC.

== Selected publications ==
=== Articles ===
- "Why not collect Antigua?", Gibbons Stamp Monthly, Vol. 44, 3 parts in Nos. 4, 5 & 6.

=== Books ===
- Antigua Traditional Exhibit, 1693 to 1946 Victory Issue Specimens. c. 1980s.
- B.W.I. Study Circle Bulletin. Index to Bulletins 1–100. E. Victor Toeg, 1987.
- The Leeward Islands Adhesive Fees Stamps. British West Indies Study Circle, 1991. ISBN 0950653527
- Dominica: Postal History, Stamps and Postal Stationery to 1935. Vol. 1. British West Indies Study Circle, St Neots, 1994. ISBN 0950653535
