= Philip Saunders (philatelist) =

British banker and philatelist

Philip Thomas Saunders
- Born: 10 August 1899; London, England
- Died: 28 May 1975 (aged 75); New Radnor, Wales
- Occupations: Banker and philatelist
- Known for: Author of Stuckey's Bank (1928); Founding the British West Indies Study Circle (1954); Co-author of The Cayman Islands, Their Postal History, Postage Stamps and Postmarks (1962)

Philip Thomas Saunders FRPSL (10 August 1899 – 28 May 1975) was a British banker and philatelist. He started in banking before the First World War but his career was interrupted by service in the Royal Flying Corps during the conflict. Returning to banking after the war, he published a history of Stuckey's Bank in 1928, working for banks that ultimately became today's National Westminster, before retiring in 1959.

In philately, he founded the British West Indies Study Circle (BWISC) in 1954 and wrote a survey of the postal history, postage stamps and postmarks of the Cayman Islands with Everard F. Aguilar that was published in 1962. His work and that of other collaborators on a survey of the postal history, stamps, and postal stationery of Dominica to 1935 was completed by fellow BWISC member E. Victor Toeg and published in 1994.

== Early life and family ==
Philip Saunders was born in the City of Westminster, London, on 10 August 1899. He served in the First World War as a 2nd Lieutenant in the Royal Flying Corps between 1917 and 1919 and in June 1918 received an aviator's certificate from the Royal Aero Club.

He married Annie Rose Titford, who worked at the Royal Philatelic Society London for over 30 years before retiring in 1957.

== Career ==
Saunders entered banking shortly before the outbreak of the First World War working at banks that ultimately became today's National Westminster Bank. In 1928 he published a history of Stuckey's Bank, a private bank located in England's West Country which became part of Parr's Bank and then National Westminster Bank. The Economist appreciated the book for its elaboration of the family connections between the Stuckey and Bagehot families. He retired in 1959.

== Philately ==
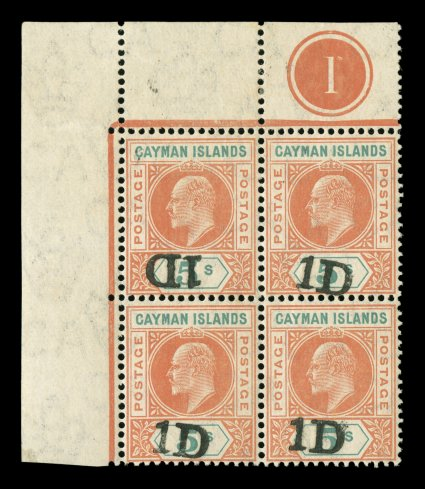
The 1907 one penny surcharge on Cayman Islands 5 shilling stamps (one inverted) that were ignored by Saunders and Aguilar in their book.

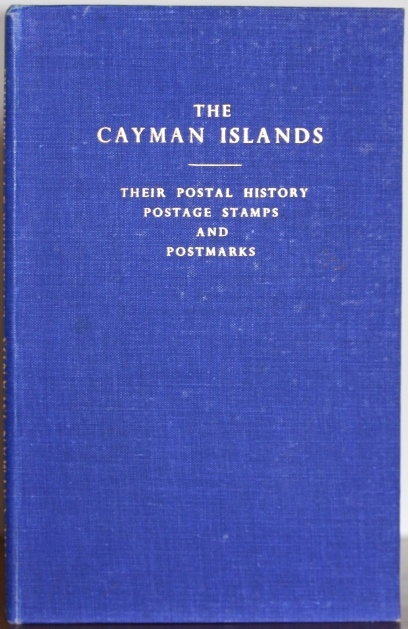
The Cayman Islands, Their Postal History, Postage Stamps and Postmarks by Saunders and Aguilar (1962)

He founded the British West Indies Study Circle in January 1954 and the same year joined the Royal Philatelic Society London, later becoming a fellow of that organisation. He was secretary of the BWISC from 1954 to 1971 and for a time edited its Bulletin.

With Everard F. Aguilar, he wrote a standard book on the postal history, postage stamps, and postmarks of the Cayman Islands that was published in 1962. At the time resident in Buckinghamshire, his address was given as Caymans Cottage, Ridgmont, Bletchley. The authors attempted to identify any mail sent from the islands before the introduction of stamps, of Jamaica, in 1889 but, despite a search that began in 1955, found no such mail in any private collection. In 1854, the Cayman islanders had written to London requesting the establishment of a mail service, schools, and other public services but received no substantive reply, only the continuation of what has been described as London's "benign neglect" of the islands which by the early twentieth century had earned them a reputation as "the islands that time forgot". Saunders and Aguilar did identify two letters of 1805 from islanders to General Sir George Nugent, governor of Jamaica, held by a museum in Kingston, Jamaica, and a number of letters from the 1840s, thought to number seven or nine by John Byl, held in the archives of the Methodist Missionary Society.

The book received a positive review in The London Philatelist, apart from criticism of the omission of the "scandal" of 1907/08 when Cayman Islands stamps were hand-surcharged to alleviate a shortage of half and one penny stamps. The surcharging was seen in philatelic circles as unnecessary and an attempt to benefit officials or local collectors.

== Death and legacy ==
Saunders died at his home of Min-y-Nant in New Radnor, Wales, on 28 May 1975. His funeral and burial were at St. Mary’s Church, New Radnor. He received an obituary in the Bulletin of the BWISC.

His work and that of other collaborators on a survey of the postal history, stamps, and postal stationery of Dominica to 1935 was completed by fellow BWISC member E. Victor Toeg and published in 1994, the first book devoted to the philately of the island since Bertram W. H. Poole's monograph of c.1909.

== Selected publications ==
- Stuckey's Bank. Barnicott & Pearce, Taunton, 1928.
- The Cayman Islands, Their Postal History, Postage Stamps and Postmarks. F. J. Parsons, Folkestone, 1962. (With Everard F. Aguilar)
