= Postage stamps and postal history of Antigua =

Antigua was discovered by Christopher Columbus, in 1493, and was named after the church of Santa Maria la Antigua in Seville. It was first settled in 1632. By the Treaty of Breda in 1667 it became a British Possession.

== First stamps ==
The postal arrangements of Antigua were controlled by the British Postmaster General in London till 1 May 1860. The island authorities set up an internal post in March 1841, between St John's and English Harbour, with Mr Scotland as the postmaster. From 1858 Great Britain stamps were made available for use in Antigua. Letters from St John's were postmarked "A02" and those from English Harbour were obliterated with "A18".

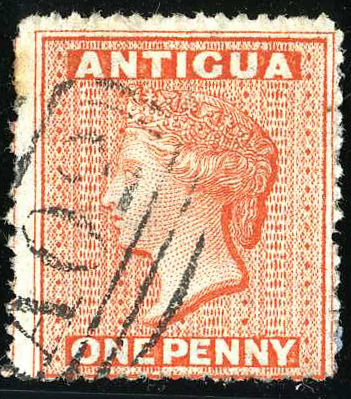
An 1867 Antigua stamp depicting Queen Victoria

The Post Office Act of Antigua, passed on 24 April 1860, by the Assembly of the Leeward Islands, transferred control to the local government. The first order for stamps was for a sixpence denomination to be used for the letter rate from Antigua to Great Britain. A consignment of 8,000 stamps, was sent out on 1 July 1862, by the printers, Messrs Perkins Bacon and Co. These arrived and were issued sometime in August 1862. A one penny stamp was issued in 1863. The design of these stamps is based on a drawing of Queen Victoria's head by Edward Henry Corbould and was engraved by Charles Henry Jeens. The plates from which Messrs Perkins Bacon and Co had printed all the Antiguan stamps up to that date were handed over to the new contractors for the colony, Messrs De la Rue and Co on 23 November 1871.

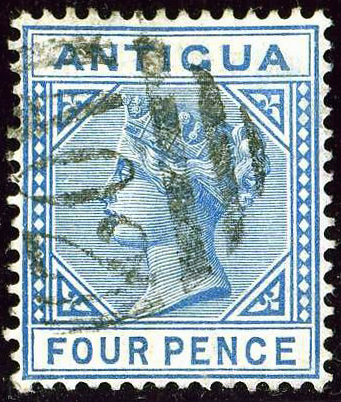
An 1879 Antigua stamp

A 2½d and a 4d stamp, with a new design known as the "Key Plate", were issued in 1879, a ½d stamp was issued in 1882, a 2½d stamp in a changed colour and a one shilling value were issued in 1884, using the "Key Plate" design as before.

== King Edward VII ==
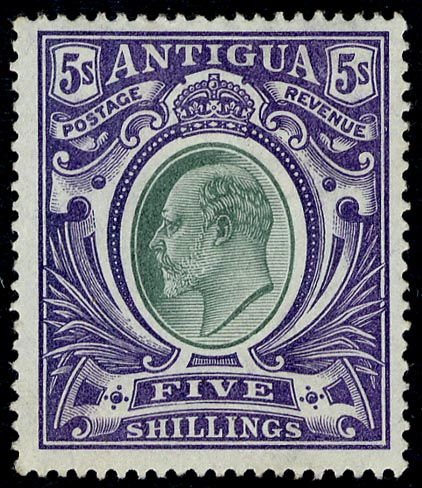
An Antigua stamp depicting King Edward VII issued in 1903

Between 31 October 1890 and July 1903 Leeward Islands stamps were used in Antigua.

At a meeting on 29 June 1903 the Executive Council of the Leeward Islands authorised separate issue for each of the islands to be used concurrently with those of the Leeward Islands. Ten values, from ½d to 2s 6d, showing the Royal Arms and the Seal of Antigua and a 5s showing the head of King Edward VII were issued in July 1903.

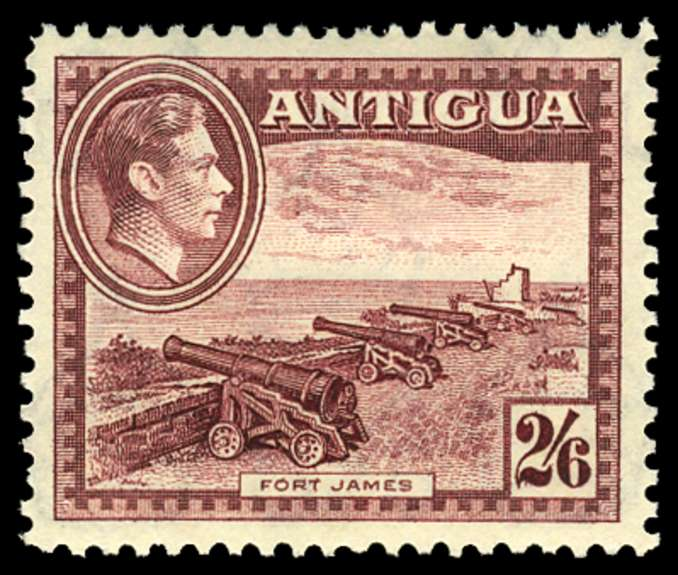
A 1942 stamp of Antigua showing Fort James

== Later issues ==
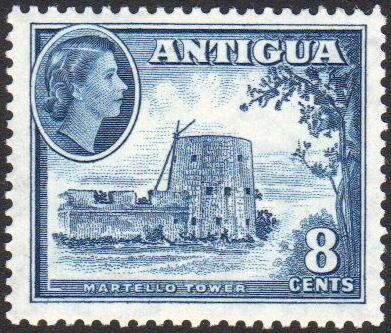
A 1953 stamp of Antigua showing the Martello Tower in Barbuda

Stamps of Antigua were used concurrently with issues of the Leeward Islands until 1956.

A total of seven different stamps were issued during the reign of Queen Victoria (1837–1901) and ten different stamps were issued during the reign of King Edward VII (1901–1910). During the reign of King George V (1910–1936) a total of 29 different stamps were issued and 25 stamps were issued during the reign of George VI (1936–1952). Since 1953 some 3,000 different stamps have been issued to date.

== Barbuda issues ==
Stamps were issued for Barbuda from 1922 to 1924, overprinting on stamps of the Leeward Islands.

== Independence ==
On 1 November 1981, the island with Barbuda and the island of Redonda gained independence as Antigua and Barbuda.

Stamps were again issued for Barbuda between 1967 and 2000, and for Redonda, which is uninhabited, between 1979 and 1991.

== Postal stationery ==
In comparison to stamps Antigua has issued very little postal stationery, in fact the total to about 1990 is 23 items.

- A total of six different postcards have been issued, one in 1880, two in 1886, one in 1903 and one in 1924. Three reply postcards have been issued, two in 1886 and one in 1903.
- Only two postal stationery envelopes have ever been issued, a 1d and a 2½d, both in 1903.
- A total of nine registration envelopes were issued, if different sizes are counted. Two in 1903, four in 1924 and three in 1959.
- In 1967 the only aerogramme from the island was issued.
- Two newspaper wrappers were issued in 1903.

== See also ==
- Postage stamps and postal history of the Leeward Islands
- Revenue stamps of Antigua
- British Caribbean Philatelic Study Circle
- British West Indies Study Circle
