= Revenue stamps of the Leeward Islands =

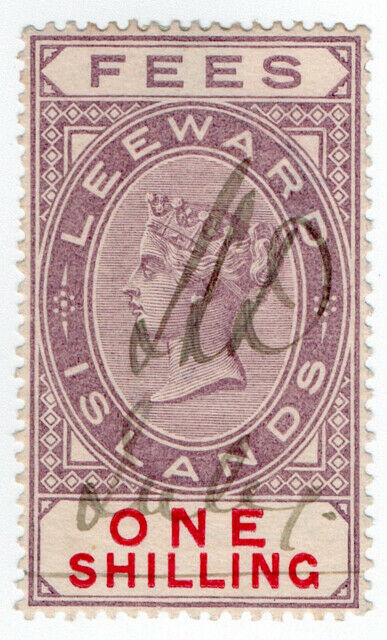
One shilling fees stamp of the Leeward Islands, 1882 issue.

Revenue stamps of the Leeward Islands were issued by the British Leeward Islands between 1882 and the 1930s. They were used on Antigua, the British Virgin Islands, Dominica, Montserrat and Saint Kitts and Nevis, all of which also issued their own revenue stamps before, during or after they used common issues for the Leeward Islands.

The Leeward Islands revenues were intended to minimize printing expenses which would be incurred by having separate issues for each island. They were all inscribed FEES, and were mainly used for land registry or judicial fees. The first set consisted of five stamps with the denominations of 6d, 1/-, 2/-, 5/- and £1, and it depicted Queen Victoria. The stamps were printed by De La Rue and were sent to Antigua in late 1881, so they were probably issued later that year or in 1882, around eight years before the first postage stamps of the Leeward Islands . The stamps continued to be reprinted until 1901, with most printings being sent to Antigua, although some were also sent to Saint Kitts-Nevis and Montserrat.

Between 1902 and 1904, a new set was issued depicting the new monarch, King Edward VII. The set consisted of five denominations, the same as the previous issue. Printings of these stamps continued until 1905 and were sent to Antigua, Dominica and Saint Kitts. The 6d to 5/- values were reprinted using a new watermark and in some cases new colours between 1907 and 1913, and printings of these were sent to Antigua, Dominica and the Virgin Islands.

A new set depicting King George V was introduced in 1916. Three values were initially issued: 6d, 1/- and 2/-, with a 5/- being added in 1918. Printings of these were sent to Antigua, Dominica, Montserrat and Saint Kitts, with the final reprint occurring in 1919. The George V issues were reprinted using a new watermark between 1921 and 1930, with a £1 value being added in 1929. No issued copies of the 5/- with the new watermark or the £1 have been recorded, although they are known from the printers' archives. Printings of stamps with the new watermark were sent to Saint Kitts, Dominica and Antigua.

Dual-purpose postage and revenue stamps of the Leeward Islands were also valid for fiscal use on the islands from 1890 to the 1950s.

The Leeward Islands also had colourless impressed duty stamps which were directly embossed onto documents. Designs inscribed LEEWARD ISLANDS FEES and depicting an Imperial Crown and flowers were prepared in 1890, and they are known used in the 1930s. Similar stamps embossed in vermilion ink might also exist.

== See also ==
- Postage stamps and postal history of the Leeward Islands
- Revenue stamps of Antigua
- Revenue stamps of the British Virgin Islands
- Revenue stamps of Dominica
- Revenue stamps of Montserrat
- Revenue stamps of Saint Kitts and Nevis
