= Postage stamps and postal history of Barbados =

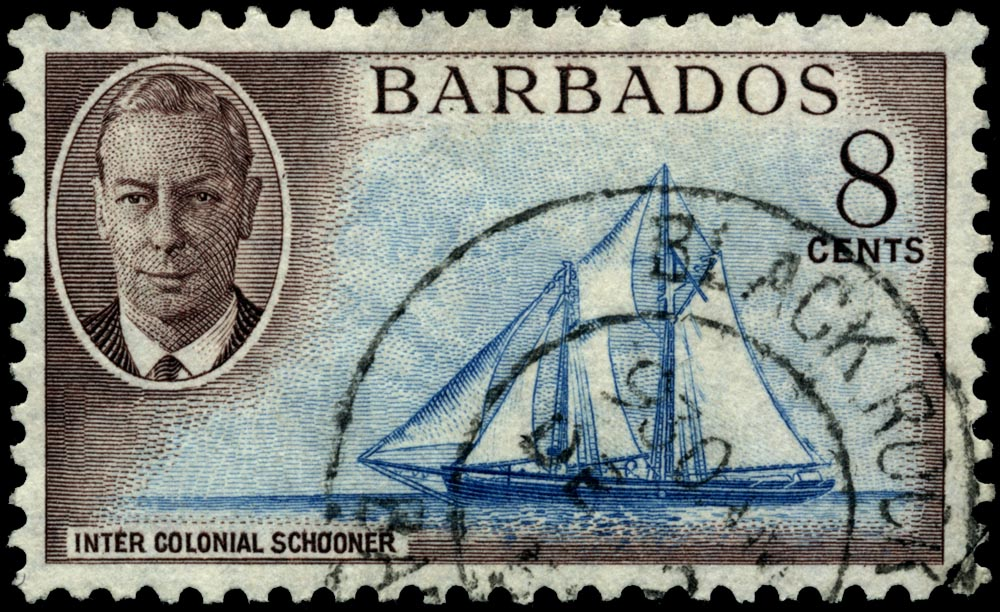
A 1950 8-cent stamp of Barbados picturing an Inter Colonial Schooner

This is a survey of the postage stamps and postal history of Barbados.

The first Europeans to arrive on the island were probably the either the Spanish or Portuguese in about the year 1500. In 1605 Sir Olave Leigh landed on the island and claimed it for King James. The first group of English settlers, about 30, arrived on the island in about 1624. More English settlers continued to arrive and by 1650 some 20,000 people had settled on the island.

== Pre-stamp period ==
The British Post Office established a Packet Agency on the island of Barbados, in Bridgetown, during the reign of Charles II in 1663. The Agency at first relied on casual ships to carry the mail. In 1702 Edmund Dummer started a monthly services from Falmouth, changing to Plymouth in 1705. The return trip took three to four months. The service ended in 1711 when Dummer was made bankrupt. In the previous nine years Dummer had lost two packets at sea and had seven captured by the Spanish. In 1711 his remaining seven packets were seized by creditors and the service lapsed. The Packet Agency again had to use casual ships to carry the mail until 1745 when a service, based on Dummer's original plans, was reintroduced by the Post Office.

Postal markings first appeared on mail from Barbados in the 1760s. At the time the name of the colony was spelt 'Barbadoes', this lasted till about 1850. The British Post Office was responsible for the internal postal system until 1 August 1851 when it was handed over to the Barbados Legislature. The British continued to operate the Packet Agency, for overseas mail, till 1858. So during this period, 1851 to 1858, there were 2 separate Post Offices on the island. Unlike several other British Colonies, Barbados did not use British Stamps at any time.

== 1851 postage rate ==
Postage rates were set at one penny per half ounce. Newspapers published in Barbados were post-free; other printed matter was charged a halfpenny. Barbados was the first British Colony to have a halfpenny rate; even preceding the Great Britain 1870 issue.

The packet rate for letters to Great Britain was six pence per half-ounce. The rate for letters to other islands in the West Indies was four pence plus one penny if not posted at the Post Office plus another one penny if the letter was delivered and not collected at the Post Office of destination.

== Barbados Britannias ==
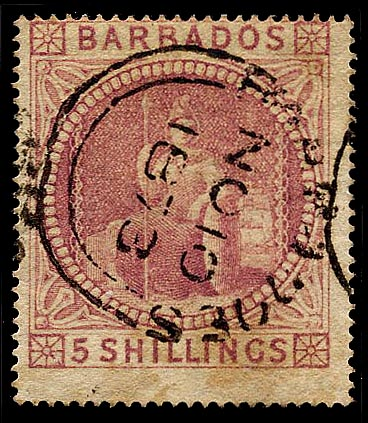
1873 5/- rose used Nov 1873 - note the old spelling of BARBADOES in the postmark.

In order to save on die costs, the stamp order for Barbados was combined with that of Mauritius and Trinidad. Each colony had the same 'Britannia' design with different wording. The design is based on a watercolour by Henry Corbould and it is believed to have been engraved by Frederick Heath. Henry Corbould provided the sketch from which the Penny Black was engraved. The first despatch of ½d green and 1d blue stamps was sent on 30 December 1851 on board the RMS Amazon; the vessel was lost at sea and failed to reach the island. Further supplies were sent in January and February 1852 including a 2d greyish slate. The local Post Office was opened on 15 April 1852 and these stamps went on sale the same day. The stamps did not show the denomination. The 2d greyish slate stamp is known bisected and used as a one-penny stamp, these were authorised for use during a shortage of 1d stamps between 4 August 1854 and 21 September 1854.

Sometime after January 1855 a supply of 4d red-brown 'Britannia' stamps were made available in the Barbados Post Office. Although at the time the island authorities were not responsible for external mail it would appear that they had decided to facilitate payment for letters going to the other West Indies islands.

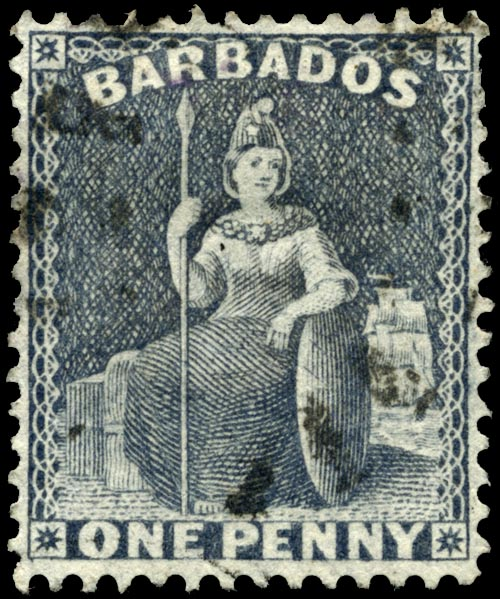
An 1875 1p grey-blue key type stamp

The British Packet Agency office was amalgamated with the Barbados Post Office in 1858. Six pence red and one-shilling brown-black stamps were ordered and sent to the island in October 1858. These stamps did show the value. Up till 1860 all the stamps were imperforate, from 1860 the stamps were supplied perforated. In 1873 two new values were supplied a three pence and a five shilling stamp. It is believed that the purpose of the three-penny stamp was to pay for postage to Great Britain by vessels other than the regular mail packets. The five-shilling stamp was not intended for any special rate and was used on heavy postal packets.

There was an unexpected shortage of the one-penny stamps in March 1878. To remedy the situation five-shilling stamps were overprinted 1d twice and perforated vertically. They were printed and perforated locally by the West Indian Press. Post Office staff then cut off the value tablets from the bottom of horizontal strips of 12 surcharged five-shilling stamps. A total of 9,600 provisional 1d stamps were produced.

In 1874 the Barbados stamp-printing contract was terminated with Perkins Bacon & Co and given to De La Rue & Co. De La Rue & Co made use of the plates handed to them to print further supplies of stamps.

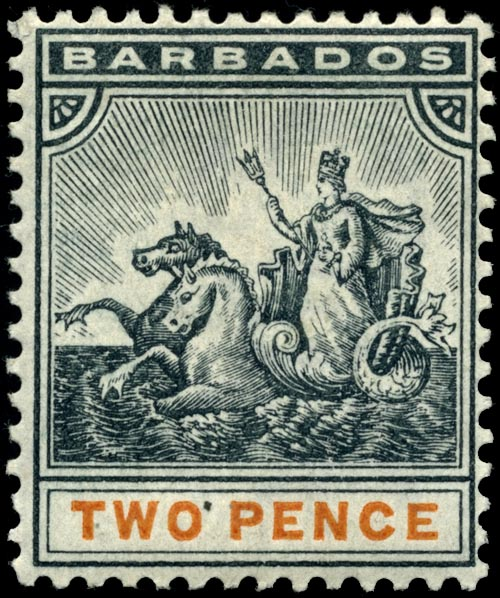
1899 2 pence

== The Barbados Queen issues ==
Halfpenny green, one-penny red, two and halfpence blue and four-penny grey stamps were ordered in February 1882 and were issued on 28 August 1882. In September 1884 the order for stamps by the island Post Office included three-penny purple and four-penny brown. An order for stamps in June 1886 included the six-penny black, one-shilling brown and a five-shilling bistre.

In July 1892 a surplus of four-penny brown stamps were overprinted HALF-PENNY. The printing was done by the West Indian Press.

== Later issues ==
Current stamp catalogues list over 1,000 different stamps as having been issued by Barbados since 1892.

Barbados attained self-government on 16 October 1961 and independence within the Commonwealth on 30 November 1966. An independence issue was issued in 1966 which included stamps of the Hilton Hotel and cricketer Gary Sobers. The first maximum card ever issued for Barbados was also issued in 1966, also featuring Gary Sobers. The image was an illustration of him batting and the stamp used was the 35c value taken from the Independence set of 1966. It can only be found bearing his autograph as he personally signed every one of them. Between 150 and 200 maximum cards were produced.

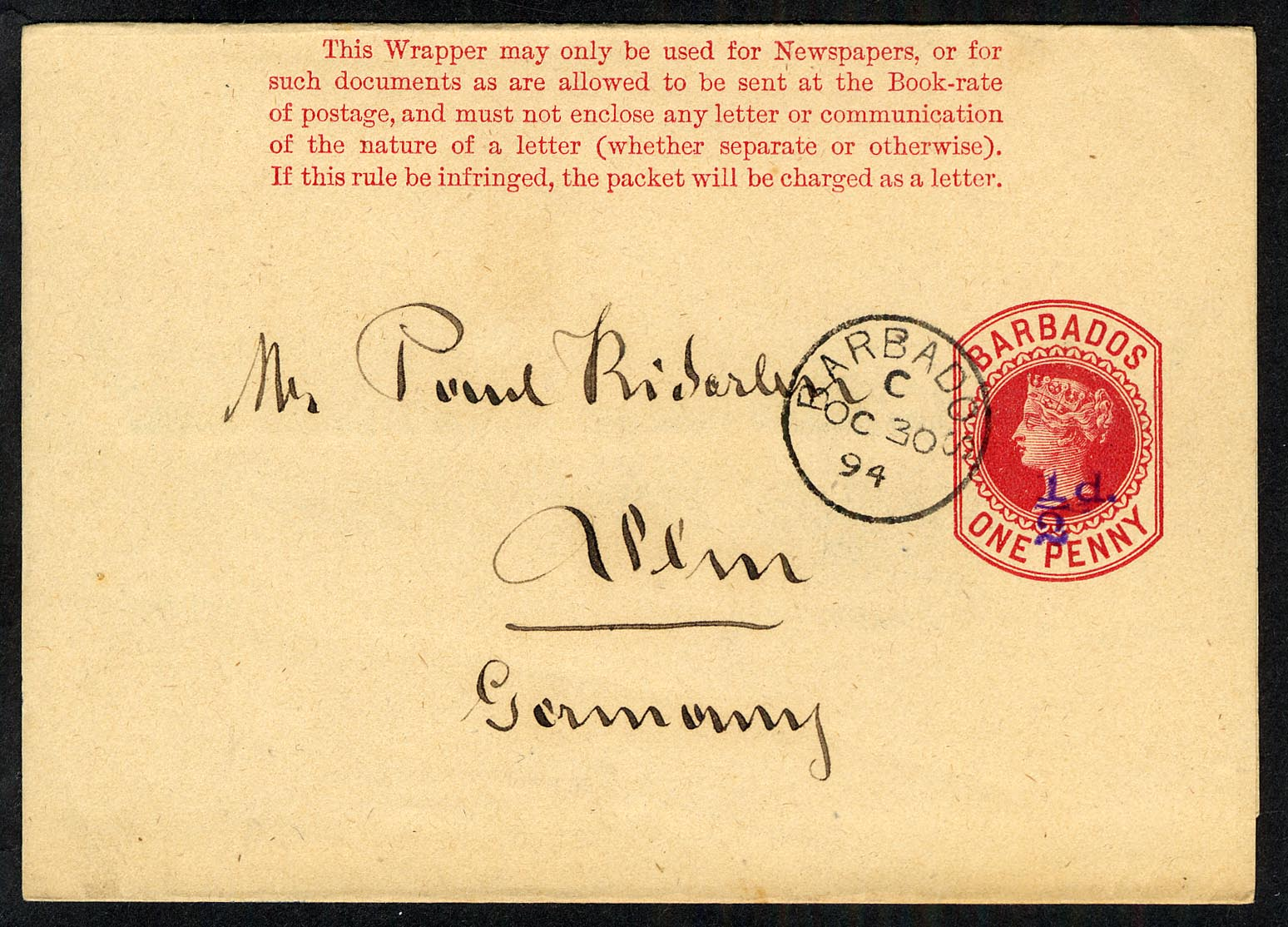
Barbados 1892 newspaper wrapper with ½d overprint on 1d wrapper, used 30 October 1894 to Ulm, Germany, with arrival datestamp on back (not shown) 16 November 1894

== Postal stationery ==
The first items of postal stationery to be issued by the Barbados were postcards in 1881; registration envelopes, newspaper wrappers and post paid envelopes were first issued in 1882. Aerogrammes were first issued in 1949

== See also ==
- Barbados Postal Services (BPS)
- Revenue stamps of Barbados
- British Caribbean Philatelic Study Group
- Royal Mail Steam Packet Company

== References and sources ==
Sources

- Bayley, Herbert H, The Post Office in Barbados, Advocate Press, Bridgetown, 1933, 73pp
- Bayley, Edmund A, The Stamps of Barbados, 1989, 405pp
- Proud, Edward B, The Postal History of Barbados and Grenada, Proud-Bailey Co Ltd, April 2006, 335 pages, ISBN 1-872465-42-0
- The Barbados Postal Service; 1600 - Post Independence (VIDEO), Barbados Government Information Service (BGIS), 4 November 2014
