= Postage stamps and postal history of Montserrat =

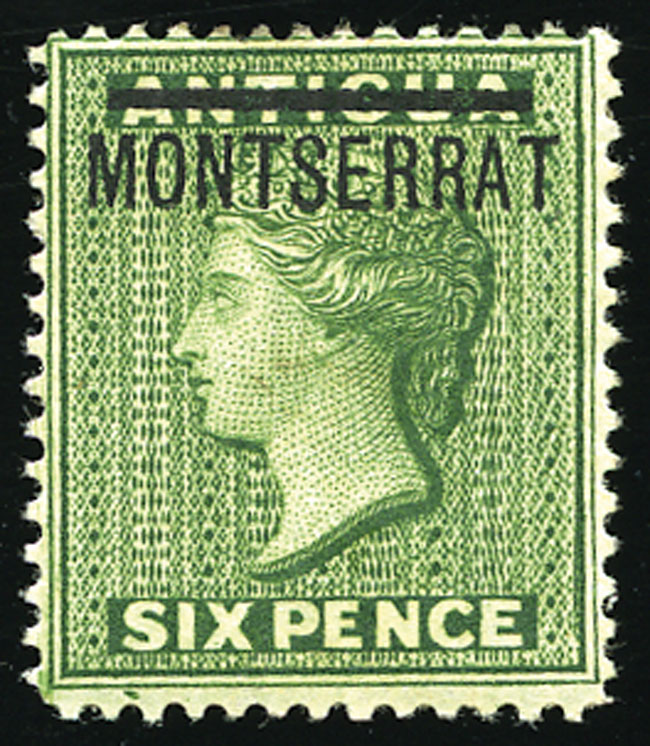
Stamp of Antigua overprinted for Montserrat in 1876

Montserrat is a British Overseas Territory in the Leeward Islands and has issued its own stamps since 1876.

== History ==
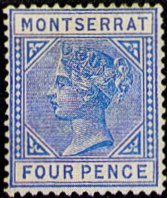
An 1880 stamp of Montserrat

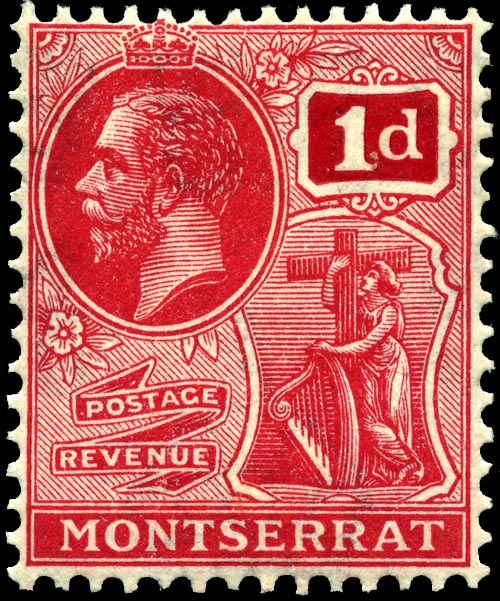
1929 stamp depicting the coat of arms of Montserrat

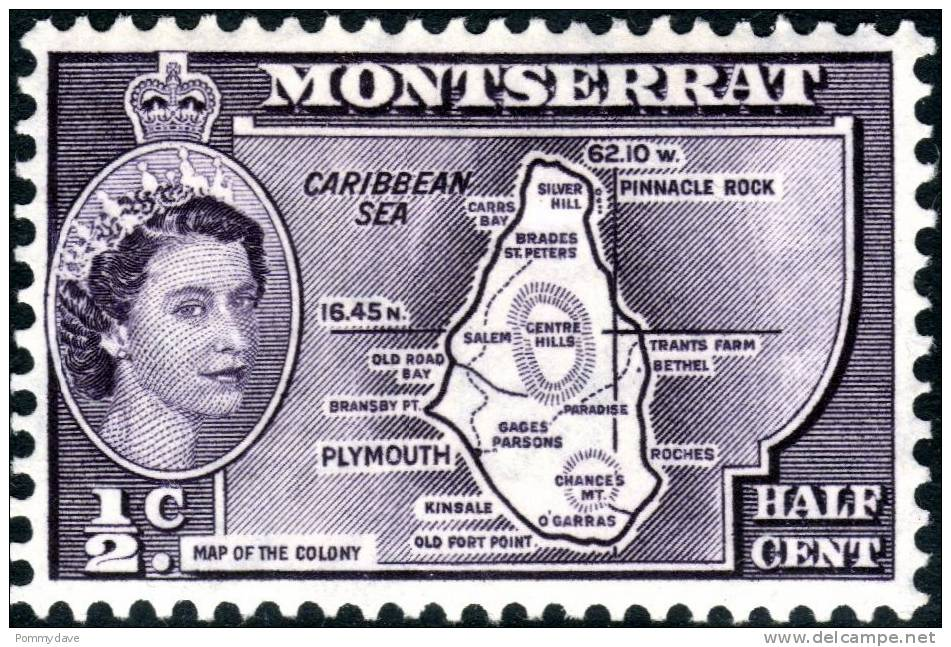
1958 stamp showing a map of the island

The first Montserrat stamps in 1876 were red 1d. and green 6d. stamps of Antigua overprinted with a line through Antigua and MONTSERRAT printed on it. The first Montserrat definitives were issued in 1880 bearing the effigy of Queen Victoria. These shared a common standardised design throughout the British Empire with the name of the colony above the Queen's head being the only deviation.

Following the passage of the Leeward Islands General Stamp Act 1890, Montserrat used stamps of the Leeward Islands between 1890 and 1903 as the law required uniform stamps for the colony. Due to pressure from the British Virgin Islands, the Executive Council of the Leeward Islands granted them permission to print stamps under their own name. This right was extended to the rest of the British Leeward Islands by the Leeward Islands Stamp Act 1902 which allowed the governor to authorise independent stamps. In 1903, a new set of definitives depicting the coat of arms of Montserrat was issued. These featured an effigy of King Edward VII of the United Kingdom and a barefoot representation of Erin holding a Celtic harp and a big cross to symbolise Montserrat's Irish heritage and love of Christianity. Philatielists refer to it as "Hope with a harp." Stamps of the Leeward Islands were used concurrently with those of Montserrat until 1956 when stamps for the individual islands that made up the Leeward Islands were formally legalised as standard, though the old Leeward Island stamps could be exchanged at post offices. By the 21st century, Montserrat had started including shamrocks in their stamps.

== See also ==
- Postage stamps and postal history of the Leeward Islands
- Revenue stamps of Montserrat
