= Everard F. Aguilar =

Jamaican horticulturist, stamp dealer, and philatelist

- Born: 14 March 1913; Kingston, Jamaica
- Died: 16 August 1966 (aged 53); Jacks Hill, Kingston, Jamaica
- Education: Calabar High School
- Occupations: Horticulturalist & stamp dealer
- Known for: The Philatelic Handbook of Jamaica (1949); The Cayman Islands, Their postal history, postage stamps and postmarks (1962)

Everard Francis Aguilar (14 March 1913 – 16 August 1966) was a Jamaican horticulturist, stamp dealer, and philatelist.

He was a member of a family of Jamaican businessmen known for their connections to the horse racing industry. He first worked in real estate before dividing his time between horticulture and philately, both of which were his hobbies as well as his professions. He wrote and published a handbook of the philately of Jamaica in 1949 and from 1949 to 1958 edited and published the British West Indian Philatelist.

He wrote a survey of the postal history, postage stamps and postmarks of the Cayman Islands with Philip Saunders that was published in 1962 and became a standard work on the area. He re-established the Jamaica Philatelic Society in 1963 and edited its journal but his later years were marred by feuding with the Jamaican government, post office, and others. He fell seriously ill in early 1966 and died the same year, being buried at sea rather than at the family grave plot in Kingston.

== Early life and family ==
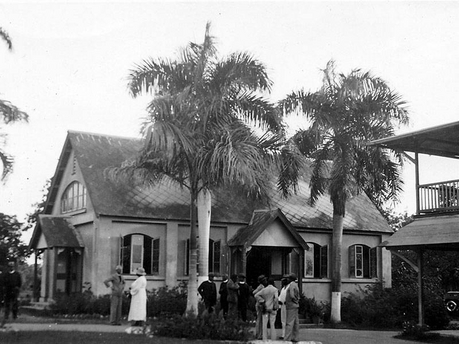
Calabar High School chapel

Everard Aguilar was born on 14 March 1913 in Kingston, Jamaica, the third and youngest son of the Jamaican-born financier and auctioneer Thomas Newton Aguilar (1851–1937) and his second wife, an Englishwoman named Miss Bastian. Thomas Aguilar was a successful businessman who owned the Knutsford Park Racecourse in Spanish Town, a funeral business, Aguilar's Furnishing Warehouse in Kingston, and was a director of several large companies in Jamaica.

Everard was educated at Calabar High School in Kingston, and in his youth was active in shooting, yachting, badminton and fishing. In the summer of 1935 he toured Europe and North America. In 1940 he took part in the Montego Bay Regatta and in March 1942 had three silver cups stolen from him. He married Florence Ann Taylor (Fay) in April 1942 and they had daughters Frances and Anne.

== Career ==
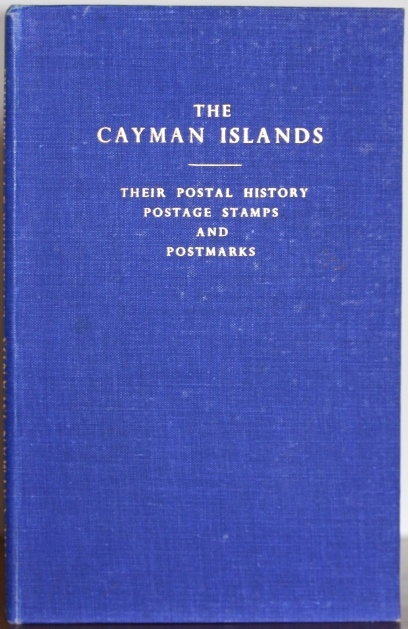
The Cayman Islands, Their postal history, postage stamps and postmarks by Aguilar and Saunders (1962)

From 1935 to 1938, Aguilar worked in real estate but later divided his time between horticulture and stamp dealing. He dealt in the stamps of Jamaica, preparing first day covers for new issues and obtaining covers showing TRDs (temporary rubber date-stamps) from the island's many rural post offices that were popular with collectors.

His activities during the Second World War are unknown but in 1948 he attended the 30th Philatelic Congress of Great Britain in Bournemouth and from 1949 to 1958 he edited and published the British West Indian Philatelist, which publication was printed by the Gleaner Company, of which his elder brother Vincent Newton Aguilar was chairman. It often contained advertising for sweepstakes and lotteries run by the Jamaica Turf Club, the Aguilar brothers having connections to horse racing through their father and Vincent's presidency of the Jockey Club. In 1958, he was appointed the West Indies commissioner for the London International Stamp Exhibition 1960, and in 1961 attended the 43rd Philatelic Congress of Great Britain at Blackpool with his family.

From around 1960 he ran The Green Thumb, a florist's shop in Kingston's Old Hope Road that had previously been owned by his brother Andrew Horatio Bastion Aguilar.

With Philip Saunders, he wrote a standard book on the postal history, postage stamps, and postmarks of the Cayman Islands that was published in 1962. The authors attempted to identify any mail sent from the islands before the introduction of stamps, of Jamaica, in 1889 but, despite a search that began in 1955, found no such mail in any private collection. They did identify two letters of 1805 from islanders to General Sir George Nugent, governor of Jamaica, held by a museum in Kingston, Jamaica, and a number of letters from the 1840s, thought to number seven or nine by John Byl, held in the archives of the Methodist Missionary Society. The book received a positive review in The London Philatelist, apart from criticism of the omission of the "scandal" of 1907/08 when Cayman Islands stamps were hand-surcharged to alleviate a shortage of half and one penny stamps. The surcharging was seen in philatelic circles as unnecessary and an attempt to benefit officials or local collectors.

In 1963, Aguilar re-established the Jamaica Philatelic Society with the assistance of The Institute of Jamaica, and published and edited its official journal West Indies Stamps. David Horry describes it principally as a vehicle for Aguilar to air his feuds with the Jamaican post office and government, stamp printers, and the large London dealers Stanley Gibbons by whom he felt slighted. He proposed ideas for several stamp issues which were ignored or rejected, such as after the death of James Bond creator and Jamaica resident Ian Fleming, and tighter processes at the Post Office made it harder for him to produce the covers for sale to collectors which formed an important part of his trade.

He wrote a chapter on Jamaican stamps for Morris Cargill's Ian Fleming Introduces Jamaica (1965) for which Fleming provided the introduction, Cargill the editing, and various experts the chapters on different aspects of Jamaica.

== Death ==
Aguilar fell seriously ill in early 1966 and travelled abroad for treatment but returned to Jamaica still in poor health. He died at his home in Jack's Hill, a suburb of Kingston, on 16 August 1966. He was buried at sea and not at the family grave at St Andrew's Parish Church as his father and brothers were. He received obituaries in The Daily Gleaner and the BWISC Bulletin.

== Selected publications ==
- The Philatelic Handbook of Jamaica. E. F. Aguilar, Kingston, 1949. (2nd edition 1959)
- The Cayman Islands, Their postal history, postage stamps and postmarks. F. J. Parsons, Folkestone, 1962. (With Philip Saunders)
- "Jamaican stamps" in Morris Cargill (Ed.) Ian Fleming Introduces Jamaica. Andre Deutsch, London, 1965.
