= Harrison and Sons =

British engraving and printing company

- Type: Private Limited Company
- Industry: Security printing
- Founded: 1750
- Founder: Thomas Harrison
- Defunct: 1997
- Fate: Sold to De La Rue
- Headquarters: High Wycombe, England
- Products: Postage stamps, banknotes, passports and gift vouchers
- Parent: Lonrho

Harrison and Sons was a major worldwide engraver and printer of postage stamps and banknotes.

== History ==
The company was established in 1750 by Thomas Harrison in Warwick Lane, London; in 1839 Thomas Richard Harrison entered into partnership with John William Parker, creating Harrison and Co. It went through similar names and retained Harrison family ownership until 1979 when sold to Lonrho.

Harrison and Sons printed its first stamp, a 1d Inland Revenue stamp for Montserrat, in 1866. This seems to be the only stamp printed by the company during the 19th century.

It obtained its first Post Office contract in 1881. In 1910, a new factory opened in Hayes. The company won the contract to print the single colour United Kingdom Edward VII stamps in 1911 after the Post Office decided not to renew its contract with De La Rue. Initially, using printing machines manufactured by Timsons of Kettering, it went on to produce most of the British stamps over the 60-year period from the 1930s until the 1990s, including the first UK stamp using the photogravure method in 1934 and the first photogravure commemoratives in 1935 for Silver Jubilee of King George V. The first UK Christmas issue in 1966, on the specially designed Jumelle press, was also printed at Harrison and Sons. They printed their last British commemorative issue, referred to as "Queen’s Beasts’ issue", in 1998. The stamps were actually printed one year before they were issued to the public. During the 1920s, Harrison & Son printed banknotes for the Commonwealth Bank in Australia. In 1933, the factory moved to High Wycombe.

The company (abbreviation H&S) also printed stamps, banknotes, passports and gift vouchers for over 100 other countries from 1881. Some of its most famous publications were The London Gazette and Burke's Peerage.

In 1979, the business was purchased by Lonrho. In February 1997, it was sold to De La Rue with the High Wycombe plant refurbished. The plant closed in 2003.

== Company names ==
- Harrison and Co (1839–1849)
- Harrison and Son (1849–1854)
- Harrison and Sons (1854–1920)
- Harrison & Sons Limited (1920–1997)
