= Postage stamps and postal history of Dominica =

Survey of stamps and postal history in Dominica

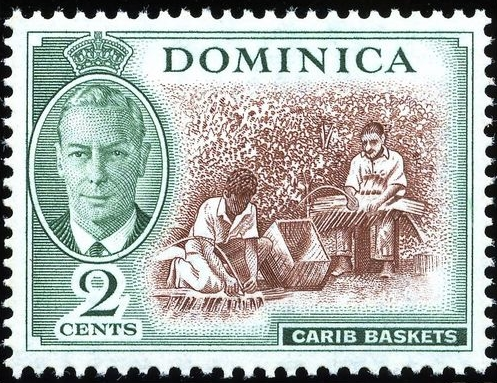
A 1951 stamp of Dominica

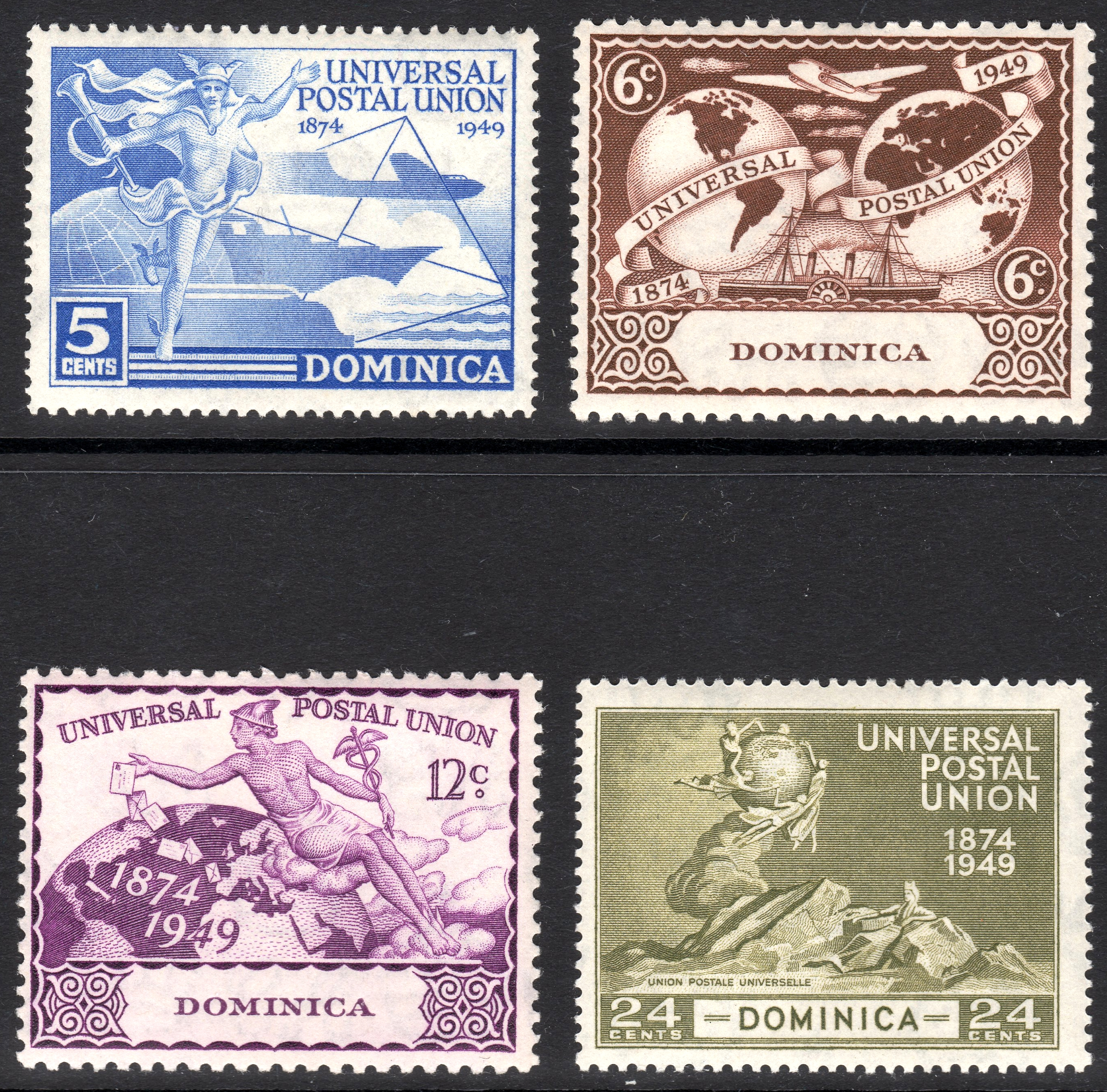
The 1949 anniversary of the U.P.U. omnibus stamp set from Dominica

This is a survey of the postage stamps and postal history of Dominica, an island nation in the Caribbean Sea. Claimed by France in the 17th century, it was later awarded to Great Britain, becoming independent in 1978.

Until December 31, 1939, Dominica was one of the Leeward Islands; it was then transferred to the Windward Islands.

== Early mails ==
The GPO in London established a branch at Roseau in 1845, using a handstruck mark reading "Paid at Dominica". Between 1858 and April 1860, British stamps were used in Dominica, and these are identifiable through a coded postal obliterator reading A07.

Later, colonial officials took charge of the posts and used their own handstruck postal markings.

== First stamps ==
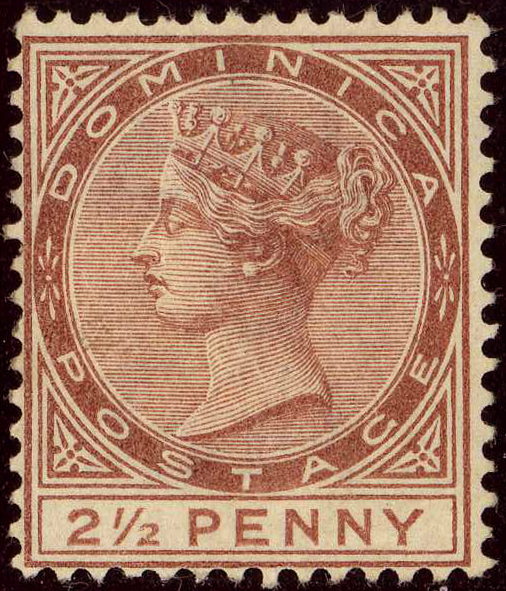
De la Rue design used in the 1874–1890 period

On 4 May 1874, Dominica issued its first stamps, with a set consisting of 1d, 6d, and 1 shilling values. The design was a profile of Queen Victoria in an oval frame with "DOMINICA POSTAGE" in the band of the frame. The same design continued in use, with additional values and changes of color and watermark, through a 1/- magenta in 1890. Provisional issues included a half-penny surcharge on bisects in 1882–1883, and surcharges in 1886.

The general issue of stamps for the Leeward Islands superseded Dominican stamps on 31 October 1890, but concurrent Dominican issues resumed in 1903, and continued through 31 December 1939.

Dominica adopted the British West Indies dollar in 1949, and the first issue denominated in the new currency was the Universal Postal Union 75th anniversary commemorative in October of that year. This was followed up in 1951 with a new series of 15 pictorials that included a full-face portrait of George VI.

The pictorial set was reissued in 1954 with a profile portrait of Elizabeth II, along with four additional designs.

== See also ==
- Postage stamps and postal history of the Leeward Islands
- Revenue stamps of Dominica
