= Barbados Postal Service =

Barabadian national postal operator

- Type: State-owned enterprise
- Industry: Postal administration, Postal services, courier
- Founded: 15 April 1852; 174 years ago
- Headquarters: General Post Office (GPO); Cheapside Main Rd., Bridgetown, St. Michael BB11000, Barbados
- Area served: Barbados (18 Mail Districts) / Worldwide
- Key people: Joann Busby (Postmaster General)
- Services: Letter post, parcel service, EMS, delivery, freight forwarding, third-party logistics, Logistics
- Number of employees: 500+
- Website: bps.gov.bb

The Barbados Postal Service (B.P.S.) is the national postal operator of Barbados and operates as a department within the Government of Barbados where it reports to the Ministry of Home Affairs. The Barbados Postal Service (B.P.S.) is headed by the acting Postmaster General, Sheila Greaves, who is responsible for maintaining the island's postal services, subject to the laws of the island. In 1852, the Postal services for Barbados were reconstituted following the passage of local legislation enabling the delivery of inland postage.

As under the Post Office Act the postal service is empowered to process express mail and parcel post items independent of HM (Barbados) Customs, including the collection of duties and taxes on behalf of H.M. Customs for low value, low dutiable items.

== History ==
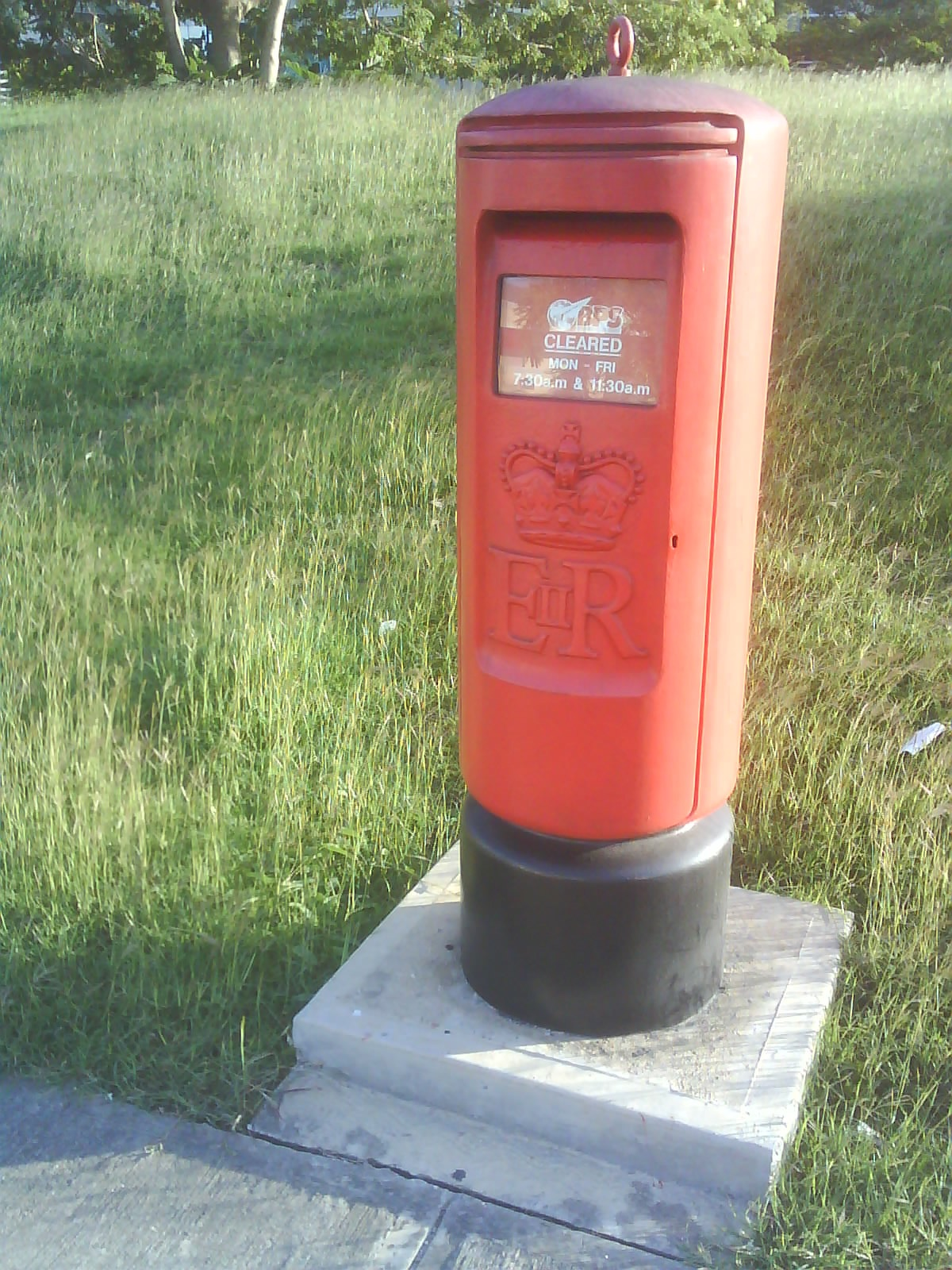
Historic pillar box (mail box) in Warrens with royal cypher of EIIR, Elizabeth II derived from Latin "Elizabeth II Regina"

Barbados has one of the world's oldest postal services. In 1663, during the reign of Charles II, England’s imperial Post Office established a packet agency on the island.

Barbados was the second territory in the British West Indies to establish an inland post service by an Act of Parliament. The local legislature much later passed the Post Office Act in 1851.

Unlike many of the other Caribbean nations, British stamps were never used for any domestic delivery postage in Barbados. The first issue of “Barbados” stamps was placed on sale on April 15, 1852, when the local Post Office also commenced its operations. It is this date on which the anniversary of the Inland Post is celebrated.

An Act of Parliament in 1854, served to fully amalgamate the former UK founded Imperial Packet Agency and the Inland Post Office created specifically for local service. By 1858 the Packet Agency's name and role were retired and all mail received became the responsibility of the colonial Barbados Postmaster.

Ever an innovator, the Barbados Post introduced Registration and Money Order Services in 1861.

For 112 years the Parliament Buildings of Barbados were the headquarters of the Barbados Postal Service from 1872 to 1984. At this location, there were a number of firsts for the Barbados Post.

- In 1874 the first stamps with values were introduced.
- In 1881 the first wall posting boxes were erected.

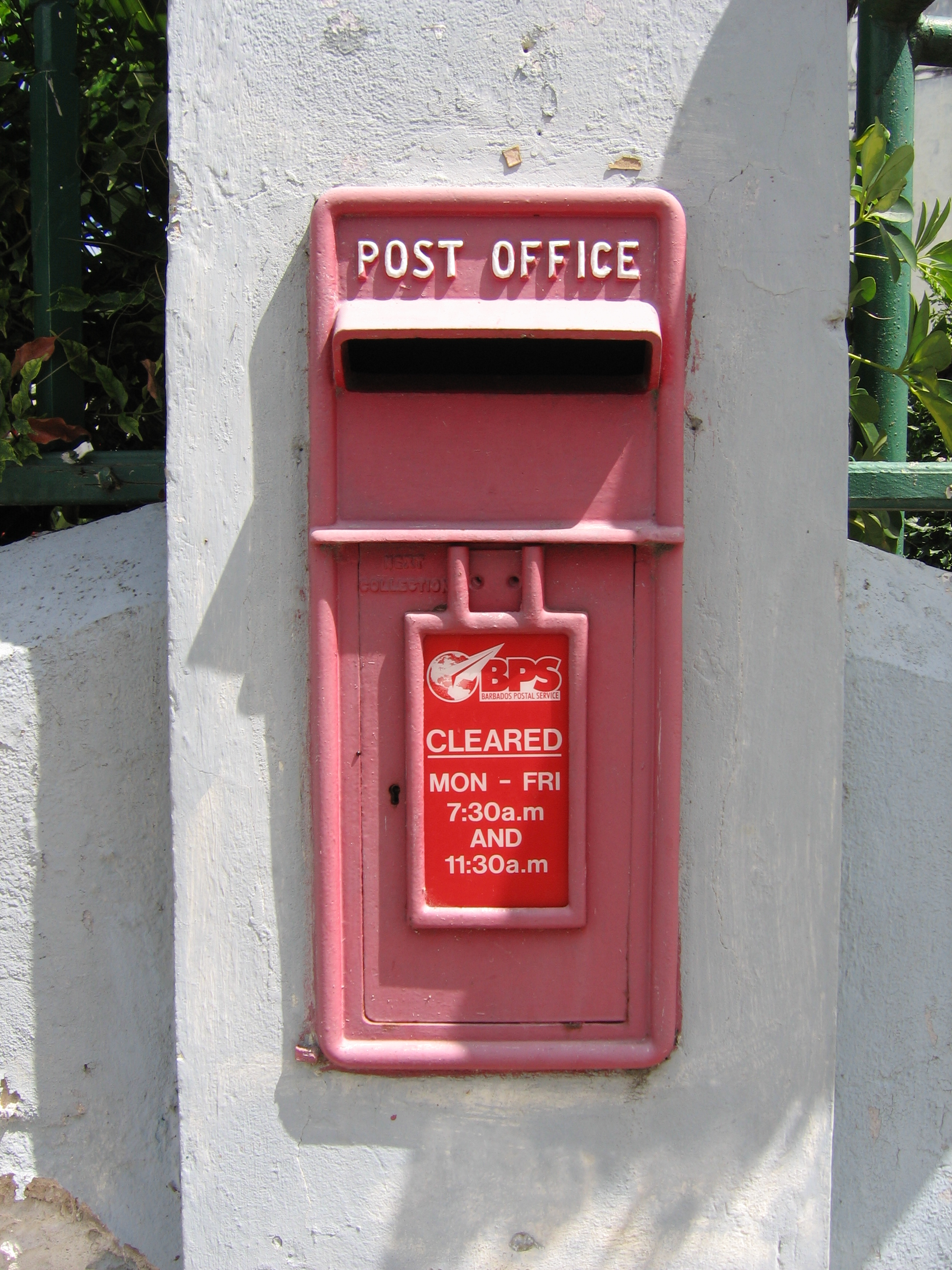
A historic wall posting box at St. Davids (Anglican) Church.

- In 1886, the Barbados Post inaugurated an International Parcel Service with England and in 1887 a similar arrangement was reached with the United States.

A legacy of the British Empire has been the use of some iconic historical pillar boxes (mailboxes) with the official cypher of the Barbadian monarch, although after political independence their further roll-out has slowed.

=== 20th-century ===
Over the 100 years in which the Post Office was headquartered in the Parliament Buildings, the Barbados Postal Service has made a valuable contribution to the social, economic and educational development of Barbados.

By 1911 an estimated annual subsidy of £4 000 from the Imperial government was payable to the Royal Mail Steam Packet Company specifically for the Barbados postal service.

In the early 1900s when scores of Barbadians emigrated to Cuba, the United States and Panama (Afro-Panamanian), and again in the 1950s, when there was also large scale immigration but to England, the Post was the primary means of facilitating communication between the migrants and their families in Barbados.

In those years, the Post was the only Agency through which families received letters, gift parcels, and cash remittances from their relatives overseas.

When World War II occurred, Barbados was not unscathed and as a result of the War, a special department known as the Censor Office was created in 1939. This office was located in a room under the Senate in the Parliament Buildings, and therein incoming and outgoing overseas mail, which showed no sign of being censored, was intercepted and scrutanised. Letters and packets were opened to determine their content. Any reference to the movement of ships was blotted out to protect ships traveling in the region from espionage and then the mail was resealed with a special Censor Label.

The Parcel Post Department served as the means by which many of the dry goods and hardware stores imported their stock in that era.

The migratory periods during the 20th Century were very profitable periods for the Barbados Post with records showing that in the 1950s, British postal orders paid to Barbadians exceeded $3 million.

=== Self-governance era ===
In 1958, Robert Clarke, the first local Colonial Postmaster of Afro-Caribbean ancestry, had the foresight to introduce a shift system and extended business hours in order to better manage the increased business activity of the Post Office.

In an effort to contribute to the personal and professional development of postal workers, departmental training courses for clerical staff, Postal Assistants and Postmen were introduced in 1961.

On 11 November 1967, after earlier being represented as a British territory, Barbados became a full member of the UPU as a sovereign nation.

The Barbados Philatelic Bureau within the Postal Service was established in 1968 for the purpose of promoting the sale of postage stamps in the very lucrative market worldwide.

Following exposure to international developments in the postal service as a result of participation in conferences around the world, a highly specialised International Postal Affairs branch was introduced. This division was to be headed by a knowledgeable and experienced senior postal official. In 1971 therefore, a post of Assistant Postmaster General responsible for international postal affairs was established and Mr. Lloyd Weekes was appointed to the position on August 16, 1971.

As a result of involvement in the UPU, Barbados was able to host its first international postal conference, the pre-Congress Commonwealth Conference of Postal Administrations (CCPA), from September 2 to 5, 1979. This meeting served as preparation for the 1979 Postal Union Congress in Rio de Janeiro, Brazil, during September and October.

In 1984 the Barbados Government, for the first time, authorised the Postmaster General to sign the Acts of the Hamburg Congress “ad referendum” in addition to the Minister with responsibility for the postal services. Prior to this Congress, only the Minister was authorised to sign the Acts of Congress.

Another significant development in Barbados’ postal services was the introduction of the Express Mail Service to the US and the United Kingdom from October 1, 1984. The idea to develop this service to attract new business and retain old customers came as a result of a Barbados delegation's attendance at an International Express Mail Service Conference in Washington in 1983. This prompted Barbados to negotiate its first Express Mail Agreements with the US and the UK during 1984.

Today, in spite of competition from commercial delivery services, the Barbados Post boasts of door-to-door delivery to 90,000 households in Barbados; thus contributing to a reputation for highly developed postal service for all citizens.

This reputation made Barbados one of the region's leaders in postal policy.

=== 21st-century ===
It was reported in April 2019 that the BPS would embark on a USD$40,000 Integrated Postal Reform and Development Plan (IPDP) in collaboration with the UPU.

In 2024 BPS signed a strategic express mail agreement with global provider DHL.

== Functions and services ==
The BPS is charged with providing the following postal and financial services at post offices:

- Basic postal service (handling and delivering mail and parcels)
- Additional postal services (General delivery, registered mail, International Accelerated Mail/Express Mail Service (EMS), Poste restante, (customer pickup), P.O. Box.
- Postal savings, money orders and PostPay (Bill payment).

== General Post Office complex ==
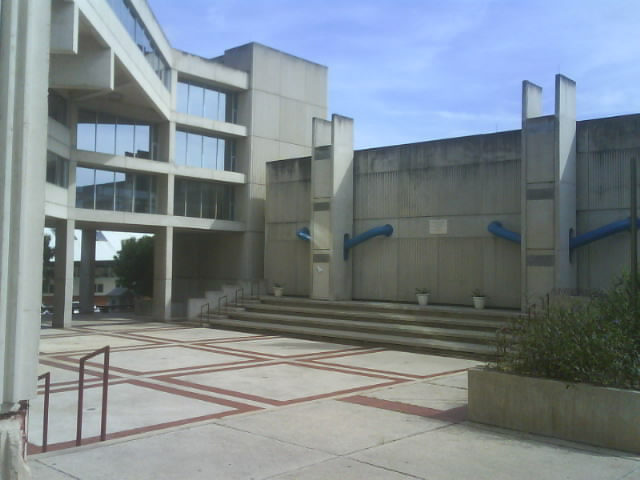
Jackie Opel Amphitheatre

On September 24, 1979, the then Minister of Communications and Works, the Hon. Lindsay Bolden turned the sod at the Cheapside location to signal the start of construction of the GPO's new headquarters. At a cost of $16 million, the complex, which was designed by Barbadian architect Mervyn A. Awon initially, was awarded by contract to Sir Robert McAlpine Limited, a British company. However, that contract was terminated and a new one was awarded to a Guyanese company, A. Nabi and Sons Limited.

After completion, the government of Barbados opened the General Post Office (GPO) complex at Cheapside, Bridgetown; for business on October 29, 1984. It was not however officially opened until March 29, 1985 by Minister of Information and Culture, Senator the Hon. Nigel A. Barrow. The GPO complex includes an open-aire amphitheater which is dedicated to Barbadian musician and creator of Spouge music, Jackie Opel. At the center of amphitheater a wall plaque which was unveiled on August 29, 1998 by the then Minister of Home Affairs, the Hon. David Simmons to commemorate this dedication.

In September 2014 the Caribbean Postal Union in collaboration with the Universal Postal Union (UPU) established the Caribbean Postal Training Centre, located in the General Post Office building at Cheapside, Bridgetown. It serves as a training nexus for international postal administrations from across the Caribbean.

=== Post office locations ===
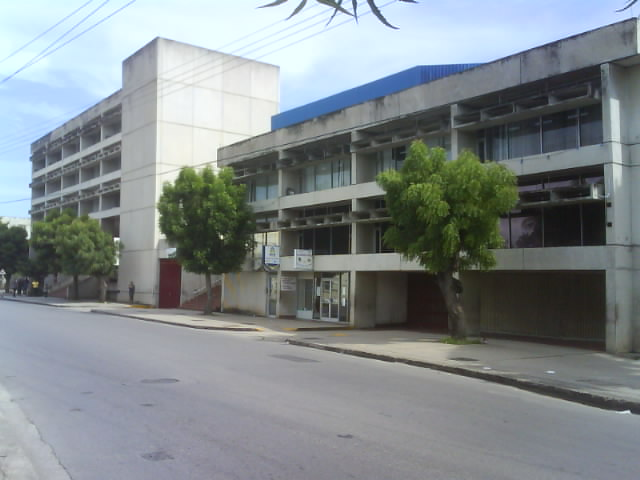
GPO Complex, in Bridgetown at Cheapside

The Barbados Postal Service maintains 18 District Post Offices across the country of Barbados. These locations help to service the approximately 160 household mail delivery routes across the country.

District post office	Main landmark/Road	Populated area	Parish	Postal code
Airport	Grantley Adams Int'l Airport; Airport Service Rd.	Seawell	Christ Church	BB16000
Bridgetown Cruise Terminal	Deep Water Harbour	(Cheapside), Bridgetown	St. Michael	BB11000
Brittons Hill		Brittons Hill	St. Michael	BB14000
Parish Of Christ Church		Oistins	Christ Church	BB17000
Eagle Hall	President Kennedy Dr.	Eagle Hall	St. Michael	BB12000
General (Main)	Cheapside Main Rd.	(Cheapside), Bridgetown	St. Michael	BB11000
Parish Of St. Andrew		Belleplaine	St. Andrew	BB25000
Parish Of St. George	Glebe Police Station complex	The Valley	St. George	BB19000
Parish Of St. James	Police Station Complex	Holetown	St. James	BB24000
Parish Of St. John	Four Rds.	Example	St. John	BB20000
Parish Of St. Joseph	Eric Holder Jr. Municipal Complex; Tamarind Hall	Blackmans	St. Joseph	BB21000
Parish Of St. Lucy		Benthams	St. Lucy	BB27000
Parish Of St. Peter		Speightstown	St. Peter	BB26000
Parish Of St. Philip	Emerald City Complex; Six Cross Rds.	Six Roads	St. Philip	BB18000
Parish Of St. Thomas		Welchman Hall	St. Thomas	BB22000
Welches Road	Welches Rd.	Welches	St. Michael	BB13000
West Terrace	N.C.F. Complex	West Terrace	St. James	BB24000
Worthing	Worthing Main Rd.	Worthing	Christ Church	BB15000

== Postal codes ==
Barbados introduced a complex new postcode system in 2006 and has gradually expanded it throughout the country. The postal code prefix is required for mail now originating from abroad as all codes have the format: [BB]NNNNN. At present there are roughly 220 postal codes to cover the 166 square miles of Barbados.

The alphanumerical code goes to the right of the city/parish. I.e. for the General Post Office it would be:

Typical older full address example(s)	New Format
title addressee street/building/complex name [neighborhood], town/city, parish "Barbados, [British] West Indies"	title addressee street/building/complex name [neighborhood], town/city BBNNNNN

== Affiliations ==
- Caribbean Postal Union
- Conference of Commonwealth Postal Administrators (CCPA)
- Universal Postal Union

== Mission ==
To process and deliver communications, goods and financial services. Locally and internationally in a secure, reliable, timely and economical manner.

== See also ==
- .post
- ISO 3166-2:BB
- General Post Office
- Communications in Barbados
- Geography of Barbados
- Postage stamps and postal history of Barbados
- Wikibooks:International Postage Meter Stamp Catalog/Barbados
