= Revenue stamps of Dominica =

Revenue stamps of Dominica were first issued in 1877, when the island was under British rule. Dominica issued very few revenue stamps, but dual-purpose postage and revenue stamps were widely used for fiscal purposes.

Between 1877 and 1879, postage stamps which depicted Queen Victoria were issued with a REVENUE overprint which was applied by De La Rue in London. Three denominations were issued: 1d, 6d and 1/-, and in 1888 the 1d value was reissued with a different watermark. In 1888, the 1d rose postage stamp was also issued with a locally produced Revenue overprint.

Although intended for fiscal use, the revenue stamps issued between 1877 and 1888 also remained valid for postal use, and are therefore regarded as postal fiscals.

The island used various impressed duty stamps in the 20th century.

Revenue stamps of the Leeward Islands, which were issued for use throughout the British Leeward Islands between 1882 and the 1930s, were also valid in Dominica.

== See also ==
- Revenue stamps of the Leeward Islands
- Postage stamps and postal history of Dominica
