= Revenue stamps of Barbados =

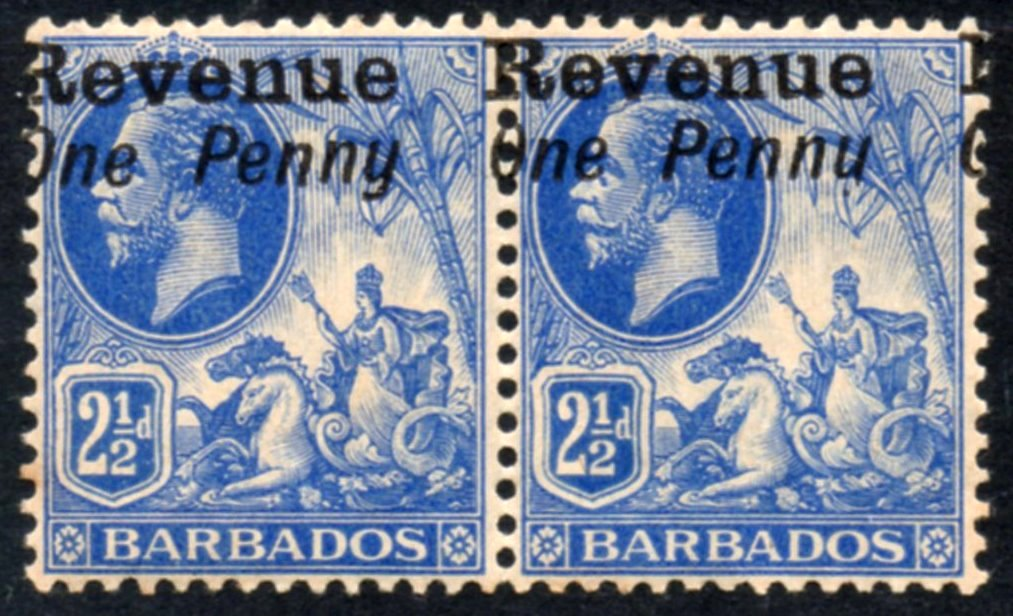
A pair of 1916 Barbados revenue stamps. The second stamp shows an error "Pennu" instead of "Penny".

Barbados first issued revenue stamps in 1916. There were various types of fiscal stamps for different taxes.

== Revenue ==
The first revenue stamps of Barbados were issued in 1916. The first issue consisted of contemporary King George V postage stamps overprinted Revenue, and some were also surcharged. This was followed by similar issues overprinted REVENUE, REVENUE ONLY or Revenue Only. Later in 1916, British embossed revenues were issued overprinted for Barbados. These issues (with several differences in design and watermark) continued to be used until 1934, and values from 3d to £100 were issued. From 1950 to 1972 embossed revenues denominated in decimal currency and with the country name incorporated in the design (instead of overprinted) were issued, with values from $4.80 to $480. These were replaced by a numeral design in 1977 which had high values from $25 to $500. From 1979 to 1985 a new design with the coat of arms of the country was issued with values up to $1000. This issue was reprinted in 1999 with the new imprint date at the bottom of the stamp.

== National Insurance ==
National Insurance stamps were first issued in 1966, with a numeral design. Six values from 55c to $3.50 as well as twelve values for the self-employed, from 35c to $6, were issued. Similar issues appeared in 1967, 1972 and 1977, with several differences in the design. In total, at least 36 different stamps were issued.

== Racing Service Duty ==
In around 2000, a revenue stamp inscribed "Racing Service Duty" with the value of 10c was issued to pay the tax on betting slips.

== See also ==
- Postage stamps and postal history of Barbados
