= Revenue stamps of Montserrat =

Revenue stamps of Montserrat were first issued in 1866, ten years before the island issued its first postage stamps. The island only issued two different designs of revenue stamps, but postage stamps were widely used for fiscal purposes and are still used as such today.

Montserrat's first revenue stamp was issued sometime around 1866. This was a 1d red stamp featuring a slightly crude design depicting Queen Victoria. It was printed by Harrison and Sons using lithography, in sheets of 12. The design was based on contemporary Inland Revenue stamps of Britain, and it was the first stamp to be printed by Harrison and Sons. A number of variants of the stamp are known, since different watermarks (indicating the name of the paper maker), types of paper (vertically or horizontally laid) and perforation (gauge 12½ or 12) were used. It also exists in a number of shades, ranging from carmine-lake to rose-carmine.

The only other revenue stamp of Montserrat was a 1d lilac issued in 1887. This was a key type stamp depicting Queen Victoria, and it was printed by De La Rue. It was printed in such a way that half the sheet was inverted with respect to the other, and this has resulted in inverted watermarks being just as common as upright ones. Tête-bêche pairs also exist but these are hard to find.

Revenue stamps of the Leeward Islands were valid for use in Montserrat. Postage stamps, both of the Leeward Islands or Montserrat itself, were also used for fiscal purposes. They are still valid for such use, and some of the high denomination stamps are mainly intended for fiscal use. Stamps issued as recently as 2014 are still inscribed Postage and Revenue.

Colourless or purple impressed duty stamps were used in the late 19th and early 20th centuries. This practice was discontinued long before the 1970s, and very few issued examples of these stamps seem to exist.

== See also ==
- Revenue stamps of the Leeward Islands
- Postage stamps and postal history of Montserrat
