= Revenue stamps of the British Virgin Islands =

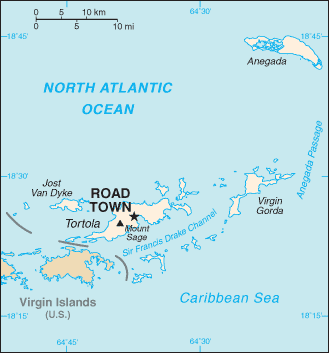
Map of the British Virgin Islands

The British Virgin Islands has issued dedicated revenue stamps since 1988. The first issue consisted of two values, $25 and $100, which were used to collect fees for wedding licences. In 1996, a set comprising three values($10, $40 and $50) was issued with a design depicting a bird. The first issue had no imprint date, but the $40 fiscal stamp is also known with imprint dates of 1997, 1999 and 2003. A $100 stamp recently was added to the series, followed by a $500 denomination in 2011.

The United States Virgin Islands also issue their own revenues.
