= Timsons =

Timsons Ltd is a family-owned company which manufactures bespoke book and flexible packaging printing presses. Timsons was founded in 1896 by Arthur Richardson Timson and employs over 200 people at its Kettering, UK headquarters. A sales subsidiary in Milan covers southern Europe, and a sales and service operation for the Americas is based in Schaumburg, Illinois.

Timsons Limited has specialised for over 50 years in the niche market of presses to print books. The variability of book sizes, and hence machine specifications, creates a need for flexibility in design and manufacture. Each press is custom built enabling the printer to select the print circumference, web width and folder to meet their own individual requirements and minimise excess trim waste.

The book printing presses typically use a lithographic web offset printing process, with Servo drives, and tailored to print and fold substrates for bibles and dictionaries on very lightweight papers, through to paperbacks, novels, reference books and computer manuals. In recent years, Bungay-based Book printer Clays used its Timson presses to produce the complete series of Harry Potter adventures including Harry Potter and the Half-Blood Prince, which sold more than 2 million in the first 24 hours. With a stable of 15 presses covering A and B format paperbacks as well as Demy and Royal sizes, Clays have Britain's largest installation of Timson presses.

The new Timson T-Flex series use a flexographic process designed to print flexible packaging with water based or UV (cationic or free radical) inks. The Welsh Centre for Printing and Coating at Swansea University purchased the first T-Flex 508 flexo press which was built originally as a ‘testbed’ for the development of the new T-Flex 600. This University use their press as a research tool.

On 1 July 2006 Timsons celebrated its 110th anniversary. The event was a triple celebration marking the opening of a new 10,000 sq ft (930 m^{2}) high bay press assembly shop, and receiving the Queen’s Award for Enterprise for outstanding achievement in innovation. The Queen’s Awards for Enterprise are the UK's most prestigious awards for business performance and this honour recognises the development and commercial success of the Timson ZMR book press.

The Timsons premises in Kettering comprises a foundry and pattern makers, machine shop, assembly shop, research bays and offices for departments from sales and design, through to service and administrative duties. Timsons also has its own Training School and prides itself in providing Mechanical and Electrical Engineering apprenticeships for approximately 6 people each year. Training has always been a high priority of the company and the first official apprenticeship training scheme was introduced in 1950 by Ernest Arthur Timson who succeeded his father Arthur Timson as managing director in 1940. The current managing director, Jeff Ward, joined the company as an apprentice in 1979 and was appointed to MD after the retirement of Peter Brown (son-in-law of Ernest Timson) in 2007.
