= Revenue stamps of Antigua =

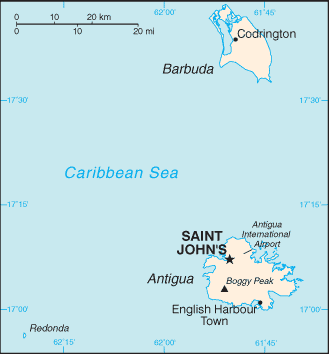
Map of Antigua, also showing Barbuda and Redonda

The island of Antigua issued revenue stamps from 1870 to 1876. The island's short life as a revenue stamp-issuing country was mainly due to the use of postage stamps for most fiscal purposes from 1862 to 1870, and again from 1890 onwards. Therefore, the only revenues issued are more commonly found mint than used. The first set was issued in 1870 and it consisted of eleven values from 1d to 10s, and four of these values were reprinted in 1876 with a different watermark. This makes a total of just fifteen revenues, with most sought after one being the 10s stamp of 1870.

Antigua also had impressed duty stamps from 1875 to 1959.

The Customs Department of Antigua and Barbuda also issues labels to pay for embarkation tax.

== See also ==
- Postage stamps and postal history of Antigua
