= British Caribbean Philatelic Study Group =

The British Caribbean Philatelic Study Group (BCPSG) exists to promote interest in, and research into, the stamps and postal history of the British Caribbean area.

The BCPSG was formed in 1961 as the British West Indies Federation Study Group. It later merged with the Bahamas Postal History Study Circle and changed its name to the BCPSG. In 1988, the Roses Caribbean Philatelic Society merged with the BCPSG.

The Study Group publishes the British Caribbean Philatelic Journal, and books and monographs.

== Selected publications ==
- Bahamas Postal Stationery, Hoey.
- Bermuda Mails to 1865, Forand and Freeland, 1995.
- British Guiana Postal History & Catalogue, Khemraj, 1990.
- Early Air Mails of St Lucia, Devaux, 1993.
- First Flights of Bermuda, Cwiakala.
- Furness Line to Bermuda, Ludington et al., 1990.
- Grenada's Postal History, Walker, 1982.
- Jamaica Railway Town Cancellations, Topaz et al.
- Leeward Islands Anthology, Oliver et al., 1997.
- Postal History Blockade Running of Bermuda, Ludington.
- Postal Markings of the Turks & Caicos, Wilson.
- The Posts of St Lucia, Ritchie.
- Town Cancels of British Honduras, Addiss, 1990.
- Town Cancels of Trinidad and Tobago, Addiss et al.
- "Unpaid" and Tax Markings of Jamaica, Lant.

== See also ==
- British West Indies Study Circle
