= Postage stamps and postal history of the Cayman Islands =

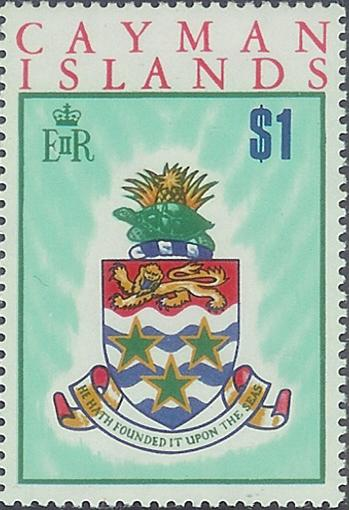
A 1970 stamp showing the coat of arms of Islands

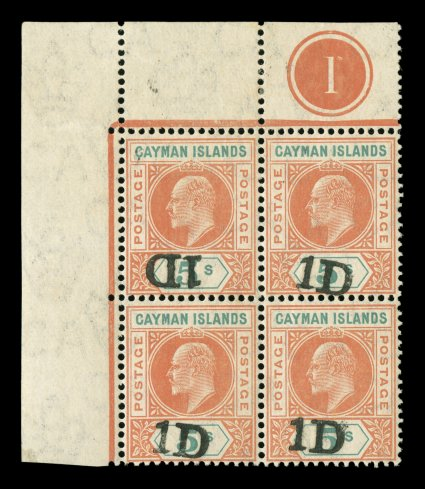
1907 stamps showing King Edward VII. They were printed as five-shilling stamps, but then overstamped as one-penny stamps.

The Cayman Islands, a British Overseas Territory located in the western Caribbean Sea, came under British control in 1670, as a dependency of Jamaica, continuing in that status until 1962.

== Early days ==
The Caymans had no regular postal system until April 1889, when stamps of Jamaica came into use. There were two known postmarks, "GRAND CAYMAN" for George Town, and "CAYMAN BRAC", used at Stake Bay. Jamaican stamps were valid until 19 February 1901.

== First stamps ==
The first stamps of the Caymans were issued in November 1900. They were two Key Plate designs depicting Queen Victoria, with values of 1/2d and 1d. These were used for little over a year before being superseded by the same design, but with Edward VII.

Shortages of stamps occurred in 1907, and overprints were produced in both Kingston and by handstamping at Georgetown. Additional shortages in 1908 resulted in the use of manuscript frankings for short periods in May and October.

At the end of 1907, a new version of the Key Plate design included the inscription "POSTAGE & REVENUE", as they were now allowed for use as revenue stamps. In 1908 a 1/4d stamp appeared, with a design consisting of the denomination in an oval frame.

The Key Plate continued in use with George V in 1912, then gave way to a new design in 1921.

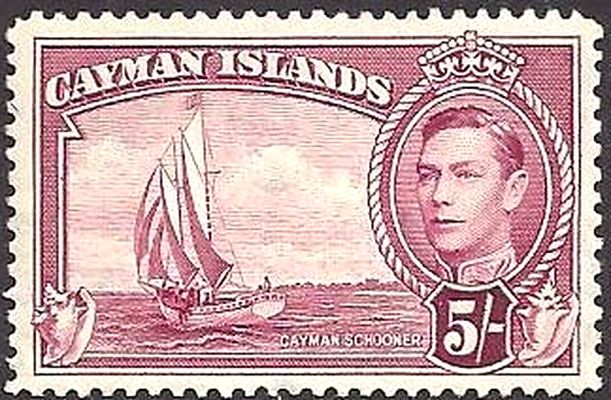
1938 pictorial stamp of Cayman Islands

== First commemoratives ==
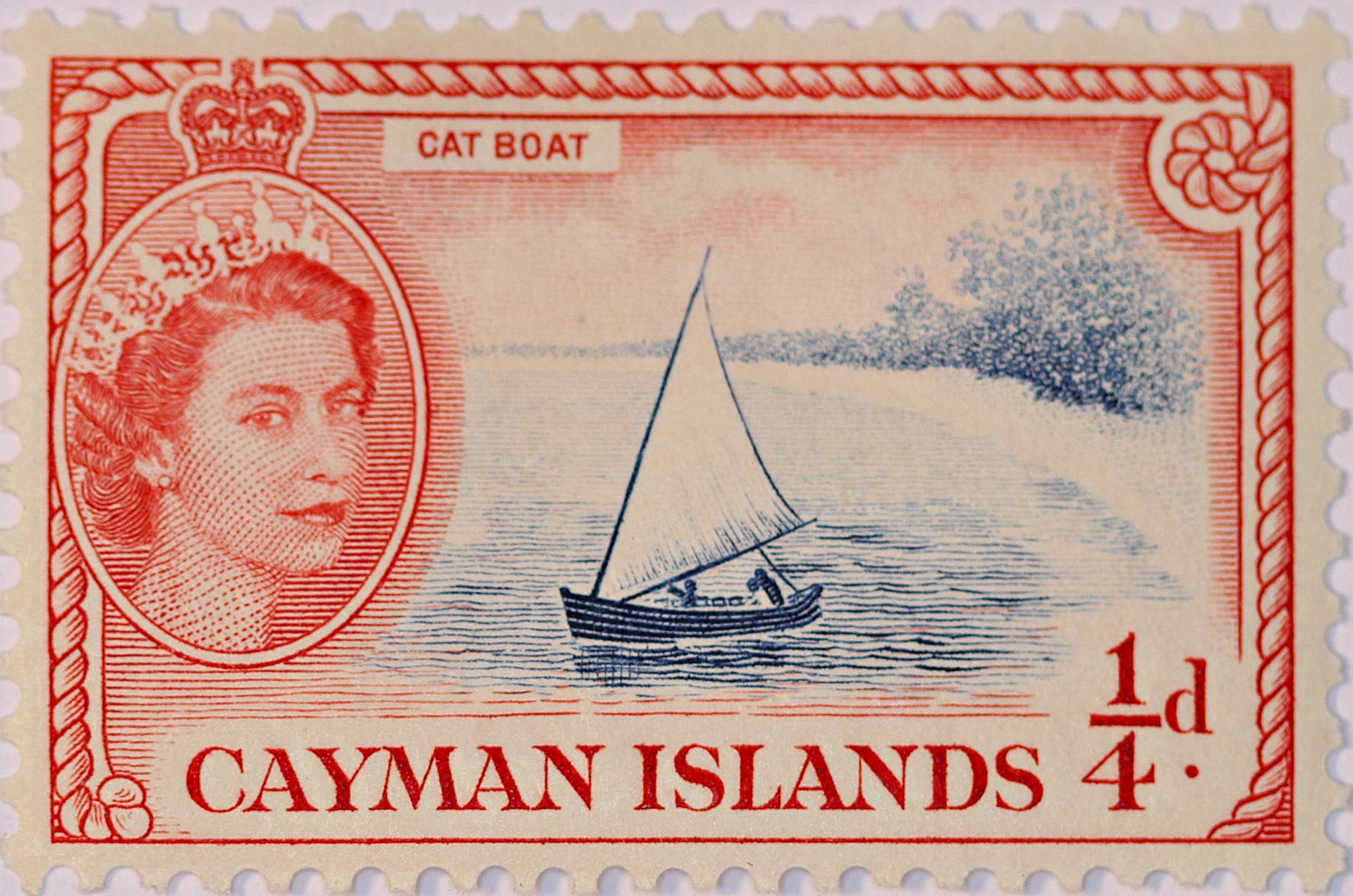
1955 pictorial stamp of Cayman Islands

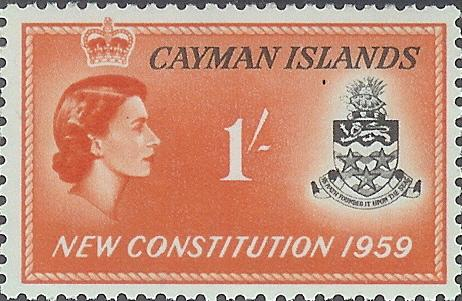
1959 stamp commemorating Caymans' new constitution

The Caymans' first commemorative stamps came in 1932, marking the centenary of the "Assembly of Justices and Vestry", now the Legislative Assembly of the Cayman Islands. The set of 12 all had the same design, consisting of profiles of George V and William IV facing each other, with palm trees in between.

The first pictorial series dates from 1935, and consisted of a set of 12 with five different designs. The pictorial series of 1938 also had five designs, with similar themes as those in 1935 but otherwise completely different. A 1950 pictorial set featured an older George VI and all different designs for its 13 stamps; these were reused in 1953 when Queen Elizabeth ascended the throne, and two new designs added, for 4d and 1-pound denominations.

A set of two stamps issued 4 July 1959 marked the Caymans' new constitution, and on 28 November 1962 a new definitive series came out.
