= British West Indies Study Circle =

The British West Indies Study Circle exists to promote interest in and the study of the stamps and postal history of the islands that comprise the British West Indies and in addition Bermuda, British Guiana (Guyana) and British Honduras (Belize) and the postal history and postal markings of other British interests in the Caribbean, and Central or South America.

The Circle publish a Quarterly Bulletin and other books and monographs relating to the area.

== Selected publications ==
- Montserrat by L.E. Britnor, revised by Charles Freeland.
- The Encyclopaedia of Jamaican Philately. Various authors.
- Trinidad - A Philatelic History to 1913 by Sir John Marriott, Michael Medlicott and Reuben A. Ramkissoon.

== See also ==
- British Caribbean Philatelic Study Group
