= Postage stamps and postal history of the Leeward Islands =

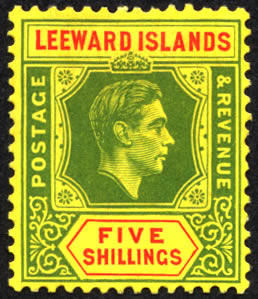
A five shilling stamp of the Leeward islands

The British Leeward Islands – Antigua, Dominica, Montserrat, Nevis, St. Christopher (St. Kitts), and the Virgin Islands – all used postage stamps inscribed "LEEWARD ISLANDS" between 1890 and 1 July 1956, often concurrently with stamps inscribed with the colony's name.

The issue of 1890 was a key plate stamp design with the usual profile of Queen Victoria, eight values ranging from 1/2d to 5 shillings. In 1897 they were overprinted with a logo commemorating Victoria's Diamond Jubilee, and in 1902 the 4, 6, and 7d were surcharged with a value of 1d.

The 1890 issue design was also used for stamps of King Edward VII, as well as for King George V and George VI, with several changes of watermark and colours. In 1928 a large ten-shilling and a one-pound Key Plate stamp were introduced, and updated for the new monarch when George VI took the throne.

The common design commemorative stamps of the Commonwealth between 1946 and 1949 included stamps inscribed "LEEWARD ISLANDS". In 1951 the West Indies University issue reflected the changeover to cents and dollars, as did the Queen Elizabeth II definitive series of 1954.

== See also ==
- Revenue stamps of the Leeward Islands

== Sources ==
- Rossiter, Stuart & John Flower. The Stamp Atlas. London: Macdonald, 1986. ISBN 0-356-10862-7
- Scott catalogue
