= List of types of revenue stamps =

This is a list of different types of revenue stamps with a list of countries that used each type.

== Additional Stock ==
- South Africa, 1913-1935 - Revenue stamps of South Africa

== Admiralty Court ==
- Great Britain and Ireland, 1855-1858 - Revenue stamps of the United Kingdom
- Ireland, 1858-1881 - Revenue stamps of Ireland

== Agreement ==
- India, 1914-c.1980 - Revenue stamps of India
  - including various states
- Pakistan, c.1950 - Revenue stamps of Pakistan

== Airport Tax ==
- Bangladesh, 1982 - Revenue stamps of Bangladesh
- Kenya, 1972-1993 - Revenue stamps of Kenya
- Libya, c.1980-c.1985 - Revenue stamps of Libya
- Malta, 1975-1988 - Revenue stamps of Malta
- Nepal - Revenue stamps of Nepal
- Southern Yemen, c.1970 - Revenue stamps of Yemen
- Sudan, c.1998 - Revenue stamps of Sudan
- Syria, 1970s-2000 - Revenue stamps of Syria
- Tanzania, 1987-1993 - Revenue stamps of Tanzania
- Uganda, c.1990 - Revenue stamps of Uganda
- Yemen, 1971-1980s - Revenue stamps of Yemen
- Zanzibar, c.1993-c.1994 - Revenue stamps of Zanzibar
- Zimbabwe, 1987-1994 - Revenue stamps of Zimbabwe

== Amusements Tax ==
- Alberta - Revenue stamps of Canada

== Animal Slaughter ==
- Ireland, c.1930 - Revenue stamps of Ireland

== Annuity Premium ==
- Great Britain and Ireland, 1893 - Revenue stamps of the United Kingdom

== Applications ==
- Malta, 1925 - Revenue stamps of Malta

== Arms Licence ==
- Baluchistan, 1973–present - Revenue stamps of Pakistan
- North West Frontier Province, 1974–present - Revenue stamps of Pakistan
- Punjab, 1974–present - Revenue stamps of India
- Sindh, 1974–present - Revenue stamps of Pakistan
- West Pakistan, c.1950-1970 - Revenue stamps of Pakistan

== Assize ==
- South Africa, c.1920-1956 - Revenue stamps of South Africa

== Assurance License ==
- Quebec, 1876 - Revenue stamps of Canada

== Attestation ==
- Pakistan, c.1960 - Revenue stamps of Pakistan

== Authorities ==
- Kuwait, c.1990 - Revenue stamps of Kuwait

== Avocado Levy ==
- Queensland, 1946-1951 - Revenue stamps of Queensland

== Bailiff Fee ==
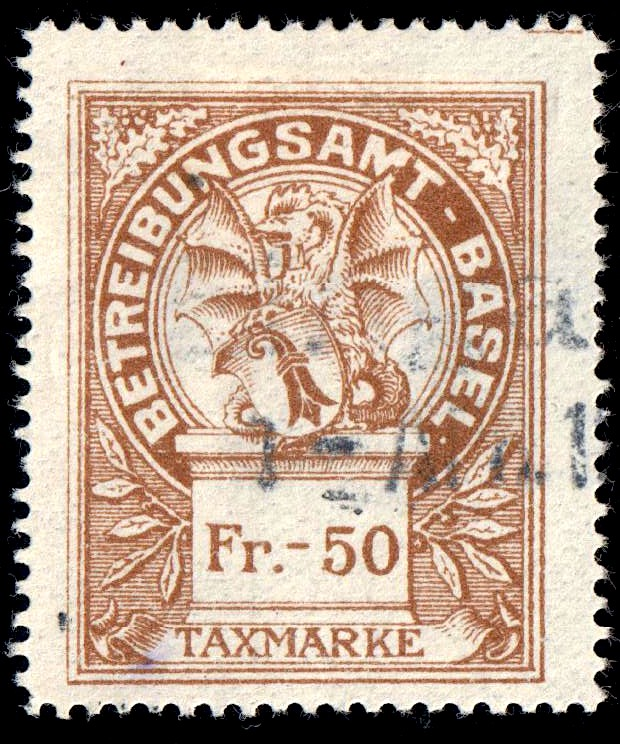
Bailiff, Basel-City 1920

- Basel-City, Switzerland, 1897-1944 - Revenue stamps of Basel
- South Australia, 1982-1990 - Revenue stamps of South Australia

== Banana Levy ==
- Queensland, 1936-1951 - Revenue stamps of Queensland

== Bank Draft ==
- Orange Free State (Orange River Colony), 1891-1900 - Revenue stamps of South Africa

== Bankruptcy ==
- Great Britain and Northern Ireland, 1869-1959 - Revenue stamps of the United Kingdom
- Ireland, 1873-1935 - Revenue stamps of Ireland
- Northern Ireland, 1921-1971 - Revenue stamps of the United Kingdom
- Quebec, 1924-1969 - Revenue stamps of Canada

== Bean Levy ==
- Queensland, 1954-1957 - Revenue stamps of Queensland

== Beer Duty ==
- Australia, 1920-1948 - Revenue stamps of Australia
- New South Wales, c.1887-1903 - Revenue stamps of New South Wales
- New Zealand, 1878-1908 - Revenue stamps of New Zealand
- Newfoundland, 1938 - Revenue stamps of Canada
- Queensland, 1885-c.1914 - Revenue stamps of Queensland
- South Australia, 1894-1918 - Revenue stamps of South Australia
- Tasmania, 1880-1918 - Revenue stamps of Tasmania
- Victoria, 1880-1906 - Revenue stamps of Victoria
- Western Australia, 1901-1906 - Revenue stamps of Western Australia

== Beetroot Sugar Association ==
- Liverpool, c.1890-1899 - Revenue stamps of the United Kingdom

== Bicycle Control ==
- Basel-City, Switzerland, 1944-1975 - Revenue stamps of Basel

== Bill of Exchange / Bill Stamp ==
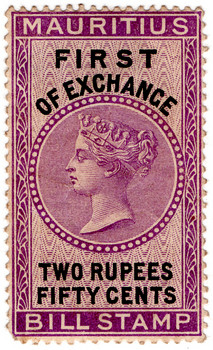
Mauritius

- Basel-City, Switzerland, 1870-1883 - Revenue stamps of Basel
- Canada, 1864-1868 - Revenue stamps of Canada
- Hong Kong, 1907-1972 - Revenue stamps of Hong Kong
- Italian East Africa, 1946
- Mauritius, 1869-1904 - Revenue stamps of Mauritius
- Nova Scotia, 1869 - Revenue stamps of Canada
- Seychelles, 1897 - Revenue stamps of Seychelles

== Bill and Receipt ==
- Jammu and Kashmir, c.1957-1964 - Revenue stamps of Pakistan

== Board of Agriculture ==
- Great Britain and Ireland, 1889 - Revenue stamps of the United Kingdom

== Bordereau ==
- Basel-City, Switzerland, 1884-1916 - Revenue stamps of Basel

== Broker's Note ==
- India, 1910-c.1980 - Revenue stamps of India
  - including various states
- Myanmar, c.2000 - Revenue stamps of Myanmar
- Pakistan, c.1950 - Revenue stamps of Pakistan

== Buffalo Fly Control ==
- Queensland, 1941-1966 - Revenue stamps of Queensland
- Tanganyika, c.1950 - Revenue stamps of Tanganyika

== Building Fund ==
- Manitoba, 1886-1887 - Revenue stamps of Canada

== Cattle Duty ==
- New South Wales, 1951-c.1980 - Revenue stamps of New South Wales
- South Australia, 1940-1966 - Revenue stamps of South Australia
- Victoria, 1927-c.2000 - Revenue stamps of Victoria
- Western Australia, 1964 - Revenue stamps of Western Australia

== Central Recruitment Fee ==
- India, c.1985-2000 - Revenue stamps of India

== Certificate of Identity ==
- Great Britain and Northern Ireland, c.1933Revenue stamps of the United Kingdom

== Chamber of Commerce ==
- Basel-City, Switzerland, 1951 - Revenue stamps of Basel

== Chancellery ==
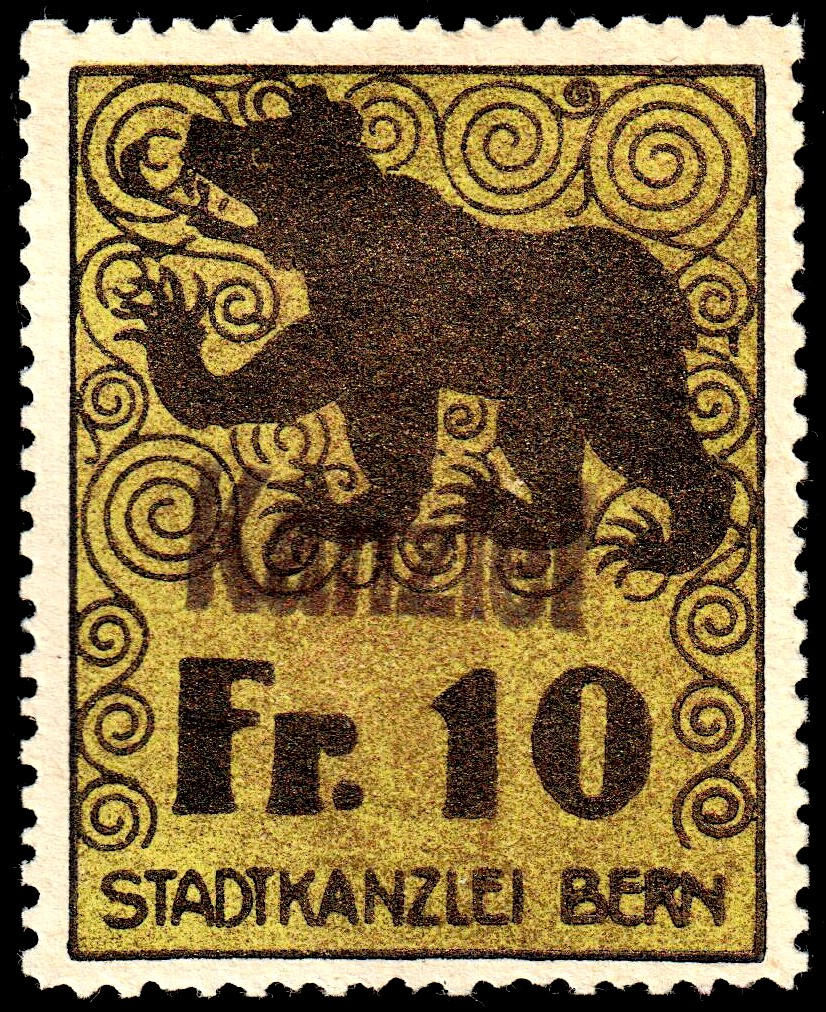
Chancellery, Bern-City 1930

- Bern-City, Switzerland, 1930 - Revenue stamps of Bern

== Chancery Fee Fund / Chancery Court ==
- Great Britain and Ireland, 1852-1875 - Revenue stamps of the United Kingdom
- Ireland, 1867-1868 - Revenue stamps of Ireland
- Lancashire, 1875-1971 - Revenue stamps of the United Kingdom

== Charity Tax ==
- Southern Yemen, 1969 - Revenue stamps of Yemen

== Children's Allowance ==
- Ireland, c.1975 - Revenue stamps of Ireland

== Chocolate Duty ==
- Great Britain, 1743 (no surviving examples) - Revenue stamps of the United Kingdom

== Cigarette Tax ==
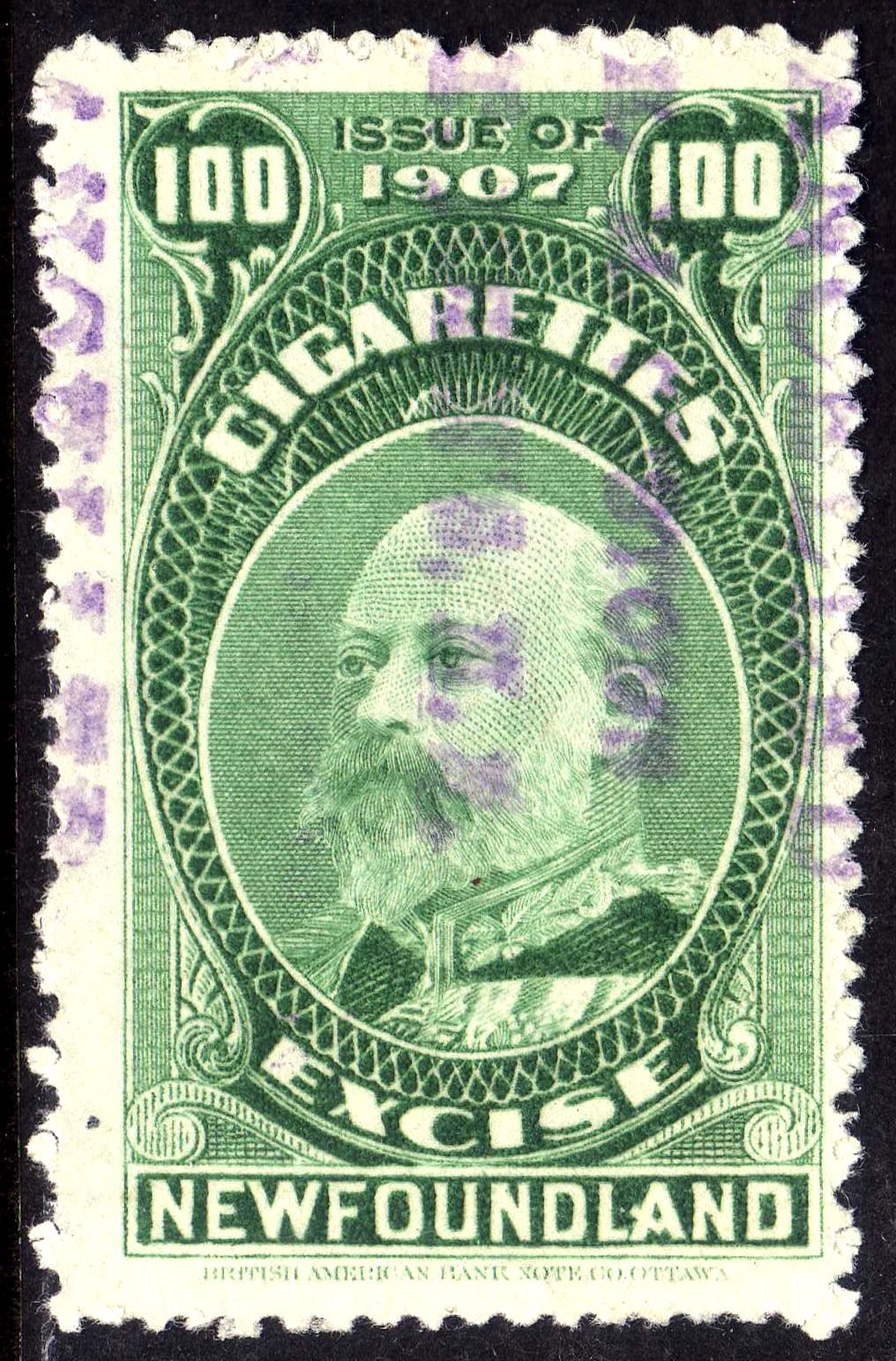
Newfoundland

- Bangladesh, c.1972-c.1975 - Revenue stamps of Bangladesh
- British South Africa Company (Rhodesia), c.1905 - Revenue stamps of Rhodesia
- Cape of Good Hope, 1909 - Revenue stamps of the Cape of Good Hope
- Kenya, Uganda and Tanganyika, c.1940s-1950s - Revenue stamps of Kenya, - Revenue stamps of Uganda
- Malta, c.1930-c.2006 - Revenue stamps of Malta
- Newfoundland, 1907 - Revenue stamps of Canada
- Northern Rhodesia, c.1930-c.1935 - Revenue stamps of Rhodesia
- Rhodesia and Nyasaland, c.1955 - Revenue stamps of Rhodesia
- South Africa, 1910-c.1980 - Revenue stamps of Rhodesia
- South West Africa, 1931-1937 - Revenue stamps of South Africa
- Southern Rhodesia, c.1930 - Revenue stamps of Rhodesia

== Circuit Court ==
- Ireland, 1927-1977 - Revenue stamps of Ireland

== Citrus Levy ==
- Queensland, 1936-1951 - Revenue stamps of Queensland

== Civil Aviation ==
- India, c.1960 - Revenue stamps of India

== Civil Service ==
- Great Britain and Northern Ireland, 1870-1947 - Revenue stamps of the United Kingdom
- Ireland, 1922 - Revenue stamps of Ireland
- Northern Ireland, 1921-1950-Revenue stamps of the United Kingdom
- Southern Ireland, 1921 - Revenue stamps of Ireland

== Civil War Victims ==
- Sudan, 1998-c.2000 - Revenue stamps of Sudan

== Cocoa ==
- Great Britain and Ireland, 1822 - Revenue stamps of the United Kingdom

== Coffee ==
- Great Britain and Ireland, 1882-1924 - Revenue stamps of the United Kingdom
- Jamaica, 1950s-1970s - Revenue stamps of Jamaica

== Colonial Office Services ==
- Great Britain and Ireland, 1900 - Revenue stamps of the United Kingdom

== Commercial Tax ==
- Sudan, c.2000 - Revenue stamps of Sudan

== Commercial Transactions Levy ==
- Uganda, 1973 - Revenue stamps of Uganda

== Commissioners' Adjudication ==
- Queensland, 1895 - Revenue stamps of Queensland

== Common Law Courts ==
- Great Britain and Ireland, 1865-1866 - Revenue stamps of the United Kingdom

== Companies Registration ==
- Great Britain and Northern Ireland, 1867-1959 - Revenue stamps of the United Kingdom
- Ireland, 1922-1971 - Revenue stamps of Ireland
- Northern Ireland, 1921 - Revenue stamps of the United Kingdom
- Southern Ireland, 1921 - Revenue stamps of Ireland

== Companies Winding Up ==
- Great Britain and Northern Ireland, 1891-1959 - Revenue stamps of the United Kingdom

== Consolidated Fund ==
- Canada, 1864 - Revenue stamps of Canada
- Manitoba, 1877-1885 - Revenue stamps of Canada

== Consular Service ==
- British Central Africa, 1898-c.1906 - Revenue stamps of Nyasaland and Malawi
- British East Africa, 1897 - Revenue stamps of Kenya
- Ceylon, 1954 - Revenue stamps of Sri Lanka
- Great Britain and Northern Ireland, 1885-1947 - Revenue stamps of the United Kingdom
- India, c.1910-1975 - Revenue stamps of India
- Ireland, 1931-1971 - Revenue stamps of Ireland
- Kuwait, 1968 - Revenue stamps of Kuwait
- Libya, 1955-1986 - Revenue stamps of Libya
- Niger Coast, 1898 - Revenue stamps of Nigeria
- Nyasaland, 1913 - Revenue stamps of Nyasaland and Malawi
- Palestine, c.1920 - Revenue stamps of Palestine
- South Africa, 1913-1980 - Revenue stamps of South Africa
- Southern Nigeria, 1902 - Revenue stamps of Nigeria
- Syria, 1947-2002 - Revenue stamps of Syria
- Uganda, c.1896-c.1898 - Revenue stamps of Uganda
- Yemen, 1940s-2012 - Revenue stamps of Yemen

== Contracts / Contract Note ==
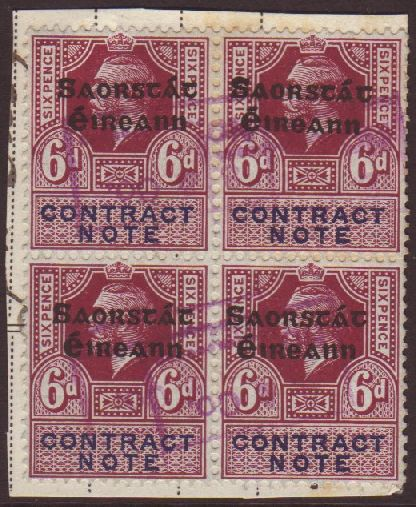
Ireland

- Great Britain and Northern Ireland, 1888-1983 - Revenue stamps of the United Kingdom
- Hong Kong, c.1945-1972 - Revenue stamps of Hong Kong
- Ireland, 1922-1943 - Revenue stamps of Ireland
- Malta, 1925-1926 - Revenue stamps of Malta
- Northern Ireland, c.1910-1971 - Revenue stamps of the United Kingdom
- Southern Ireland, 1921 - Revenue stamps of Ireland

== Contributory Pensions Insurance ==
- Bermuda, 1980-c.1984 - Revenue stamps of Bermuda

== Copyhold &c Commission ==
- Great Britain and Ireland, 1868-1881 - Revenue stamps of the United Kingdom

== Corn Trade ==
- Hull, c.1873-c.1897 - Revenue stamps of the United Kingdom
- Liverpool, c.1886-c.1972 - Revenue stamps of the United Kingdom

== Corporate Affairs Commission ==
- New South Wales, 1966 - Revenue stamps of New South Wales

== Cotton Association ==
- Liverpool, 1875-1971 - Revenue stamps of the United Kingdom

== Counterpart ==
- New Zealand, 1870-1939 - Revenue stamps of New Zealand

== County Courts ==
- Ireland, 1878-1922 - Revenue stamps of Ireland
- Northern Ireland, 1921-1971 - Revenue stamps of the United Kingdom
- Southern Ireland, 1922 - Revenue stamps of Ireland

== Court Fee ==
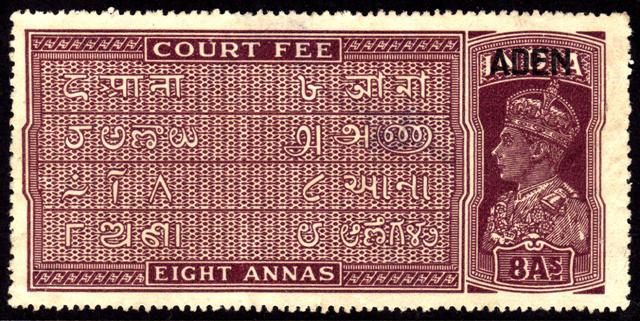
Aden

- Aden, 1937 - Revenue stamps of Aden
- Bangladesh, 1973-1992 - Revenue stamps of Bangladesh
- British Somaliland, 1900-1904
- Burma, 1936-c.1989 - Revenue stamps of Myanmar
- Egyptian Expeditionary Force, 1918-1919
- Federated Shan States, c.1930
- India, 1870-1872 - Revenue stamps of India
  - including various states
- Iraq, 1915 - Revenue stamps of Iraq
- Myanmar, c.1989-2006 - Revenue stamps of Myanmar
- Pakistan, 1948-c.1990 - Revenue stamps of Pakistan
- Palestine, 1919-1920 - Revenue stamps of Palestine
- Portuguese India, c.1962 - Revenue stamps of India
- South Australia, 1982-1990 - Revenue stamps of South Australia
- Southampton, 1878 - Revenue stamps of the United Kingdom
- Trucial States, 1948-1962 - Revenue stamps of the United Arab Emirates
- West Pakistan, 1947 - Revenue stamps of Pakistan

=== Court Fee Copies ===
- India, c.1930-1967 - Revenue stamps of India

=== Court Fee Service ===
- India, 1870-1875 - Revenue stamps of India

== Court House ==
- Sheffield, c.1892 - Revenue stamps of the United Kingdom

== Court of Justice ==
- Ireland, c.1960 - Revenue stamps of Ireland

== Custodian's Fee ==
- India, 1937-1948 - Revenue stamps of India

== Customs Duty ==
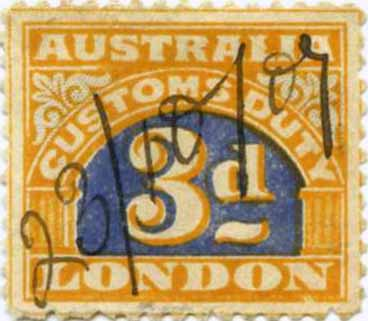
Australia

- Australia, 1907-1958 - Revenue stamps of Australia
- Canada, 1912-1935 - Revenue stamps of Canada
- Cape of Good Hope, 1902 - Revenue stamps of the Cape of Good Hope
- Great Britain and Ireland, 1860-1904 - Revenue stamps of the United Kingdom
- India, 1865 and 1957-c.1964 - Revenue stamps of India
- Ireland, 1925-1941 - Revenue stamps of Ireland
- Natal, 1903-1905 - Revenue stamps of South Africa
- Newfoundland, 1925-1938 - Revenue stamps of Canada
- Orange River Colony, c.1906-1912 - Revenue stamps of South Africa
- Sarawak, 1900-c.1924 - Revenue stamps of Sarawak
- South Africa, 1913-1954 - Revenue stamps of South Africa
- Transvaal, 1908 - Revenue stamps of Transvaal

=== Customs Entry Duty ===
- Ireland, 1924-c.1954 - Revenue stamps of Ireland

=== Customs Frank Fee ===
- South African Republic, 1893-1894 - Revenue stamps of Transvaal

=== Customs Late Fee ===
- Ireland, c.1960 - Revenue stamps of Ireland

== Defence ==
- Yemen, c.1956 - Revenue stamps of Yemen

== Denoting ==
- New Zealand, c.1920-1939 - Revenue stamps of New Zealand

== Departure Tax ==
- Australia, 1978-1990 - Revenue stamps of Australia
- Papua New Guinea, 1994-c.1995
- Turks and Caicos Islands, 1988-1998

== Design ==
- Great Britain and Ireland, 1907 - Revenue stamps of the United Kingdom

== Devair ==
- Egyptian Expeditionary Force, 1918

== Development Tax ==
- Queensland, 1938-1941 - Revenue stamps of Queensland

== Diplomatic Service ==
- Great Britain and Northern Ireland, 1964 - Revenue stamps of the United Kingdom

== Direct Court of Justice ==
- Ireland, c.1925-1977 - Revenue stamps of Ireland

== Displaced Persons ==
- Pakistan, c.1950-c.1961 - Revenue stamps of Pakistan

== District Audit ==
- Great Britain and Northern Ireland, 1879-c.1973 - Revenue stamps of the United Kingdom

== Dog Licence ==
- Ireland, 1865-1921 - Revenue stamps of Ireland
- Northern Ireland, 1921 - Revenue stamps of the United Kingdom
- Southern Ireland, 1921 - Revenue stamps of Ireland

=== Dog Licence Registration ===
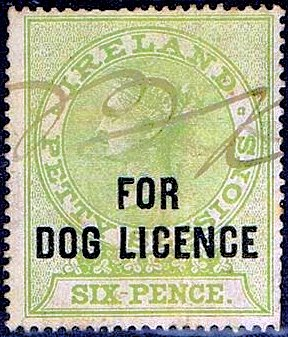
Ireland

- Ireland, 1893-1922 - Revenue stamps of Ireland
- Northern Ireland, 1922-1983 - Revenue stamps of the United Kingdom

== Driving Licence ==
- Baluchistan, 2010–present - Revenue stamps of Pakistan
- North West Frontier Province, 1985–present - Revenue stamps of Pakistan
- Punjab, 1976–present - Revenue stamps of Pakistan
- Sindh, 1971–present - Revenue stamps of Pakistan
- West Pakistan, 1970 - Revenue stamps of Pakistan

== Drought Relief ==
- Rajasthan, c.1990

== Education ==
- Myanmar, 1995-c.2010 - Revenue stamps of Myanmar

== Egg Stabilisation Charge ==
- Western Australia, 1940 - Revenue stamps of Western Australia

== Electric Light Inspection ==
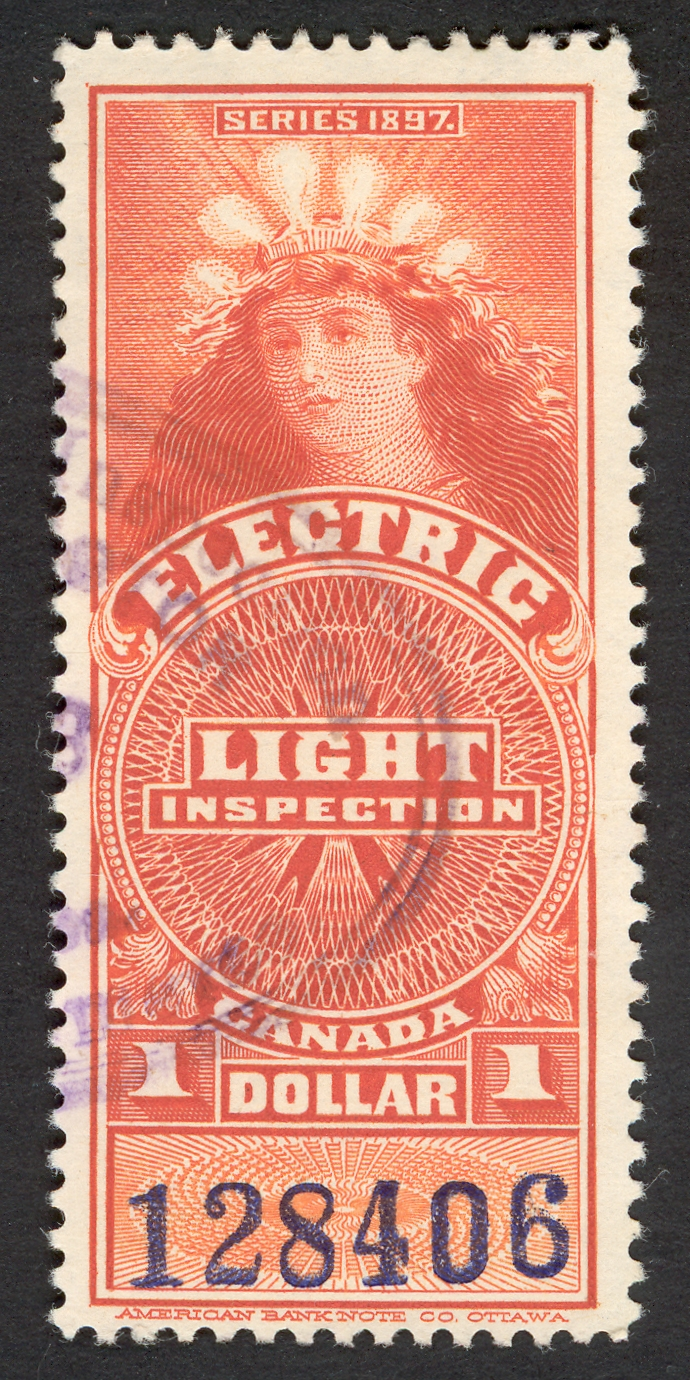
Canada

- Canada, 1895-1903 - Revenue stamps of Canada

== Electricity and Gas Inspection ==
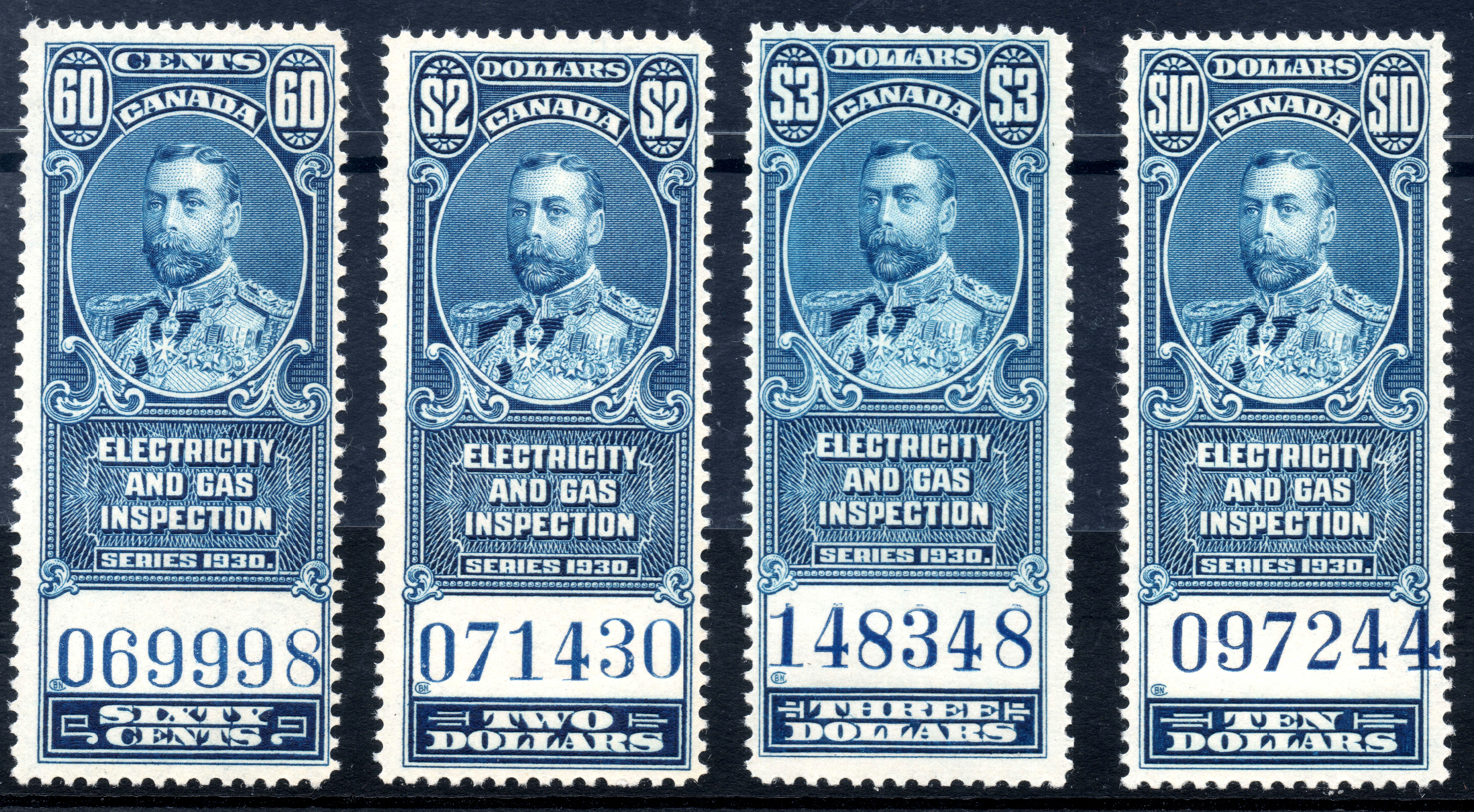
Canada

- Canada, 1930 - Revenue stamps of Canada

== Employment ==
- Basel-City, Switzerland, 1922-1956 - Revenue stamps of Basel
- New Zealand, 1937-1939 - Revenue stamps of New Zealand
- Northern Rhodesia, c.1962 - Revenue stamps of Rhodesia
- Nyasaland, c.1962 - Revenue stamps of Nyasaland and Malawi

== Entertainments Tax ==
- Assam, c.1957 - Revenue stamps of India
- Australia, c.1946 - Revenue stamps of Australia
- Bangladesh, c.1972-1983 - Revenue stamps of Bangladesh
- Bengal, 1921-1922
- Bombay, c.1920-c.1957 - Revenue stamps of India
- Cape Province, c.1940-1961 - Revenue stamps of Cape of Good Hope
- Delhi, c.1948-c.1964 - Revenue stamps of India
- Federated Malay States, c.1930 - Revenue stamps of Mayalsia
- Guernsey, 1919 - Revenue stamps of Guernsey
- Haryana, c.1964
- Jaipur, c.1957-c.1964
- Madhya Pradesh, c.1957-c.1964
- Mysore, 1957-c.1965 - Revenue stamps of India
- Natal, c.1918-c.1965
- Orange Free State, c.1915-c.1920
- Pakistan, c.1965-c.1972 - Revenue stamps of Pakistan
- Punjab, c.1948-c.1964 - Revenue stamps of Pakistan
- Rajasthan, c.1957-c.1964
- Singapore, 1955-c.1976 - Revenue stamps of Singapore
- South West Africa, 1931-c.1961 - Revenue stamps of South Africa
- Straits Settlements, c.1930 - Revenue stamps of Malaysia
- Sudan, c.1968-c.1974 - Revenue stamps of Sudan
- Tanzania, c.1963-1990
- Transvaal, c.1940-c.1950
- United Provinces, c.1930-c.1948
- West Bengal, c.1950-c.1975 - Revenue stamps of India

== Estate Duty ==
- Great Britain and Northern Ireland, 1895-1948 - Revenue stamps of the United Kingdom
- Ireland, 1922-1925 - Revenue stamps of Ireland
- New Zealand, 1868 - Revenue stamps of New Zealand
- Northern Ireland, 1921 - Revenue stamps of the United Kingdom
- Southern Ireland, 1921 - Revenue stamps of Ireland

== Excise ==
- Bangladesh, 1981-1986 - Revenue stamps of Bangladesh
- Canada, 1915-1948 - Revenue stamps of Canada
- Great Britain and Northern Ireland, 1916-1957 - Revenue stamps of the United Kingdom
- India, c.1937-c.1980 - Revenue stamps of India
- Ireland, 1922-1980 - Revenue stamps of Ireland
- Northern Ireland, 1921-c.1936 - Revenue stamps of the United Kingdom
- Pakistan, c.1958-c.1990 - Revenue stamps of Pakistan
- Southern Rhodesia, c.1942-c.1945 - Revenue stamps of Rhodesia

== Exit Fee ==
- Syria, 1970s - Revenue stamps of Syria

== External Affairs ==
- Canada, 1949 - Revenue stamps of Canada

== Family Endowment ==
- New South Wales, 1932 - Revenue stamps of New South Wales

== Farm Dairy Butter Levy ==
- South Africa, c.1930 - Revenue stamps of South Africa

== Fee ==
- Leeward Islands, 1882-1918
- Quebec, 1924-1969 - Revenue stamps of Canada
- Trinidad, 1887-c.1890 - Revenue stamps of Trinidad and Tobago

=== Free Fee ===
- Trinidad, 1887-1890 - Revenue stamps of Trinidad and Tobago

== Film Censorship ==
- Ireland, 1925-1971 - Revenue stamps of Ireland

== Financial Emergency Tax ==
- Western Australia, 1932 - Revenue stamps of Western Australia

== Fine ==
- New Zealand, 1867-1947 - Revenue stamps of New Zealand

== Fine or Fee ==
- Southton, 1880 - Revenue stamps of the United Kingdom

== Fixed Fee ==
- Canton of Bern, Switzerland, 1878-1940s - Revenue stamps of Bern
- Iraq, 1917 - Revenue stamps of Iraq

== Foreign Bill ==
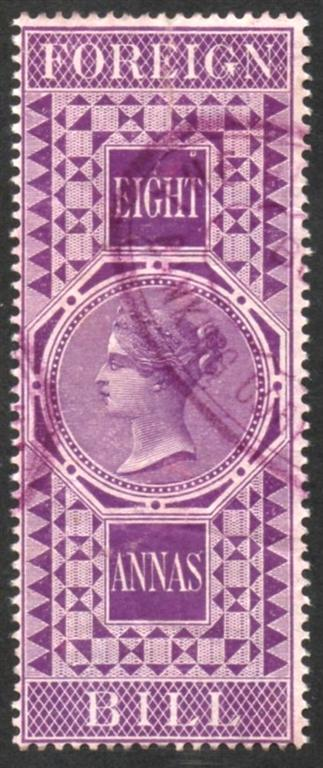
India

- Bangladesh, 1978-c.1990 - Revenue stamps of Bangladesh
- Burma, 1937-c.1953 - Revenue stamps of Myanmar
- Ceylon, 1862-1909 - Revenue stamps of Sri Lanka
- Great Britain and Northern Ireland, 1854-1959 - Revenue stamps of the United Kingdom
- India, 1860-c.1980 - Revenue stamps of India
  - including various states
- Iraq, 1915 - Revenue stamps of Iraq
- Ireland, 1922-1951 - Revenue stamps of Ireland
- Northern Ireland, 1921-1960 - Revenue stamps of the United Kingdom
- Pakistan, 1947-c.1992 - Revenue stamps of Pakistan
- Southern Ireland, 1921 - Revenue stamps of Ireland
- Straits Settlements, 1869 - Revenue stamps of Malaysia

== Foreign Office ==
- Great Britain and Northern Ireland, 1923-1950 - Revenue stamps of the United Kingdom

== Foreign Service ==
- Great Britain and Northern Ireland, 1951-1959 - Revenue stamps of the United Kingdom

== Foreign Trade Tax ==
- Syria, 1970 - Revenue stamps of Syria

== Foreign Travel Tax ==
- India, 1979-c.2000 - Revenue stamps of India

== Forest Department ==
- India, c.1890-1891 - Revenue stamps of India

== Forestry Fund ==
- Northern Cyprus, 1995 - Revenue stamps of Northern Cyprus

== Fruit Inspection Fee ==
- New Zealand, c.1940 - Revenue stamps of New Zealand

== Furniture Workers ==
- Transvaal, c.1940 - Revenue stamps of Transvaal

== Game Bird Habitat ==
- New Zealand, 1994–present - Revenue stamps of New Zealand

== Gas Inspection ==
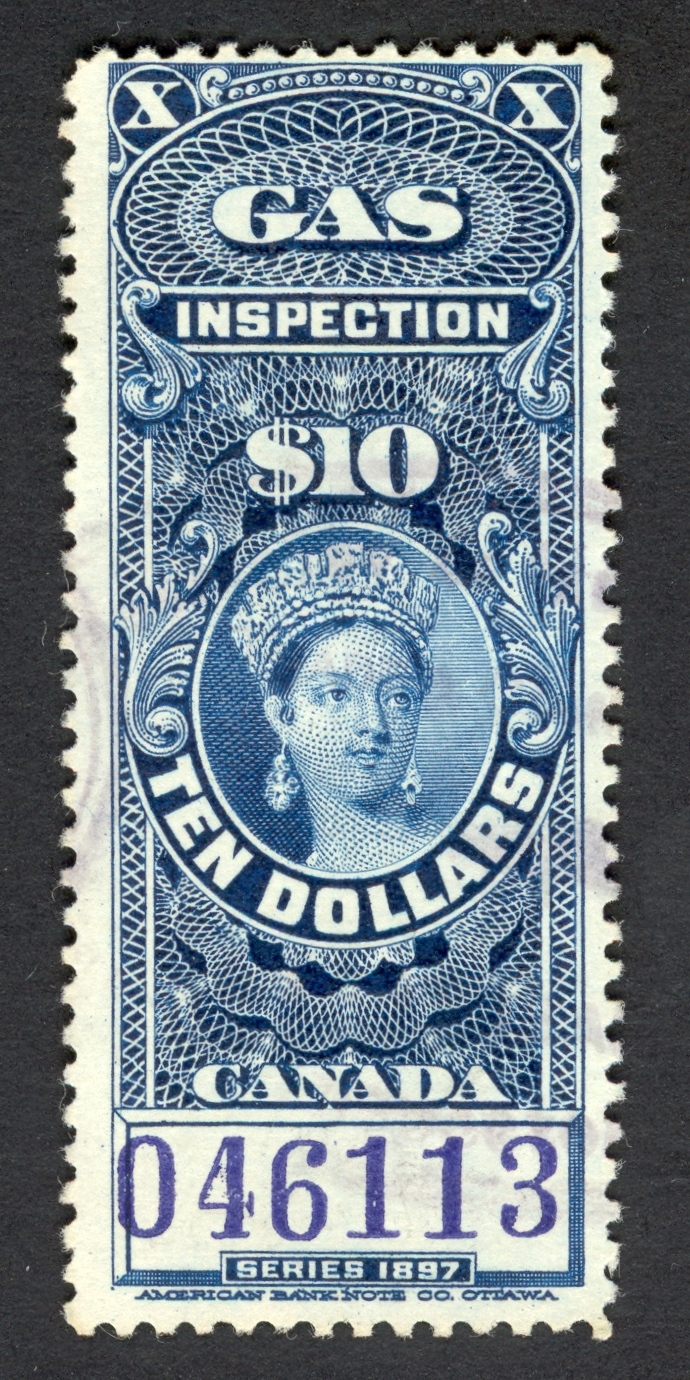
Canada

- Canada, 1875-1915 - Revenue stamps of Canada

== Gasoline Tax ==
- Ontario, 1928 - Revenue stamps of Canada

== General Security ==
- Syria, 1937-2007 - Revenue stamps of Syria

== Glove Duty ==
- Great Britain, 1785 - Revenue stamps of the United Kingdom

== Government Savings Bank Duty ==
- Western Australia, 1906 - Revenue stamps of Western Australia

== Graded Tax ==
- Swaziland, c.1970

== Graduated Tax ==
- Buganda, 1963
- Kenya, 1963-c.1970 - Revenue stamps of Kenya
- Malawi, 1970-1973 - Revenue stamps of Nyasaland and Malawi

== Guildhall Consultation Fee ==
- Great Britain and Ireland, 1892 - Revenue stamps of the United Kingdom

== Hair Powder ==
- Great Britain, 1786 - Revenue stamps of the United Kingdom

== Harbour Due ==
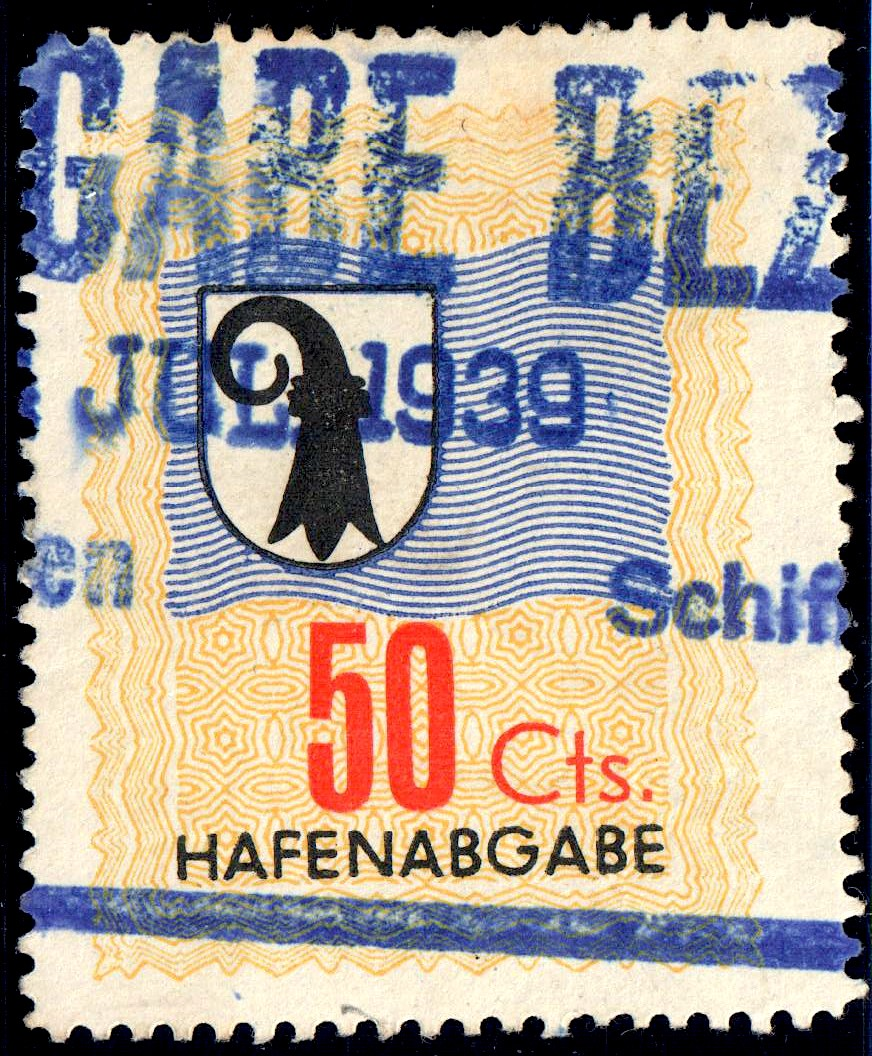
Harbour Due, Basel-City 1934

- Basel-City, Switzerland, 1934-1940s - Revenue stamps of Basel

== Hat Tax ==
- Great Britain and Ireland, 1784-1804 - Revenue stamps of the United Kingdom

== Health and Pensions Insurance ==
- Great Britain and Northern Ireland, 1925-1946 - Revenue stamps of the United Kingdom
- Isle of Man, 1930 - Revenue stamps of the Isle of Man

== Health Inspection Fees ==
- Mogadishu, c.1952

== Health Tax ==
- Syria, 1954-1980s - Revenue stamps of Syria

== Hejaz Railway ==
- Egyptian Expeditionary Force, 1918-1919
- Iraq, 1917 - Revenue stamps of Iraq
- Emirate of Transjordan, 1920-1925

== High Court ==
- India, 1869-1870 - Revenue stamps of India

=== High Court Advocate ===
- Burma, 1953 - Revenue stamps of Myanmar
- India, c.1870-c.1937 - Revenue stamps of India
- Myanmar, c.2000 - Revenue stamps of Myanmar

=== High Court Notarial ===
- India, c.1890-c.1975 - Revenue stamps of India
- Pakistan, c.1960 - Revenue stamps of Pakistan

=== High Court Service ===
- India, 1870-1904 - Revenue stamps of India

== Holiday Pay Credit ==
- Alberta, 1953-c.1965 - Revenue stamps of Canada

== Holiday and Sickness Benefits ==
- Northern Cyprus, c.1970-c.2000 - Revenue stamps of Northern Cyprus

== Honey Seal ==
- New Zealand, 1938-1959 - Revenue stamps of New Zealand

== Horse Duty ==
- Great Britain and Ireland, 1779-1840 - Revenue stamps of the United Kingdom

== Hospital Aid / Fund / Tax ==
- British Columbia, 1933 - Revenue stamps of Canada
- Kenya, 1966-2002 - Revenue stamps of Kenya
- Orange Free State, 1900 - Revenue stamps of South Africa
- Western Australia, 1930-1940 - Revenue stamps of Western Australia

== House of Lords ==
- Great Britain and Northern Ireland, 1902-1960 - Revenue stamps of the United Kingdom

== Huduma Services Charge ==
- Kenya, 1995-1996 - Revenue stamps of Kenya

== Hunting Tax ==
- British Columbia, 1946-1949 - Revenue stamps of Canada
- Canada, 1985-2005 - Revenue stamps of Canada
- Victoria, 1973-1982 - Revenue stamps of Victoria

== Identification Card ==
- Basel-City, Switzerland, 1931 - Revenue stamps of Basel
- Pakistan, c.1990 - Revenue stamps of Pakistan

== Immigration ==
- Palestine, c.1920 - Revenue stamps of Palestine
- Uganda, c.1946-1954 - Revenue stamps of Uganda

=== Immigration Clearance Fee ===
- Australia, c.1980 - Revenue stamps of Australia

=== Immigration Passports ===
- Southern Yemen, 1968-1981 - Revenue stamps of Yemen

== Income Tax ==
- Eastern Nigeria, c.1953
- Great Britain and Northern Ireland, 1914-1934 - Revenue stamps of the United Kingdom
- Guernsey, 1947-1971 - Revenue stamps of Guernsey
- Ireland, 1960 - Revenue stamps of Ireland
- Pakistan, 1991 - Revenue stamps of Pakistan
- South Australia, 1936-c.1937 - Revenue stamps of South Australia
- Syria, 1940s - Revenue stamps of Syria

== Insolvency ==
- Great Britain and Northern Ireland, 1971-c.1977 - Revenue stamps of the United Kingdom

== Insurance ==
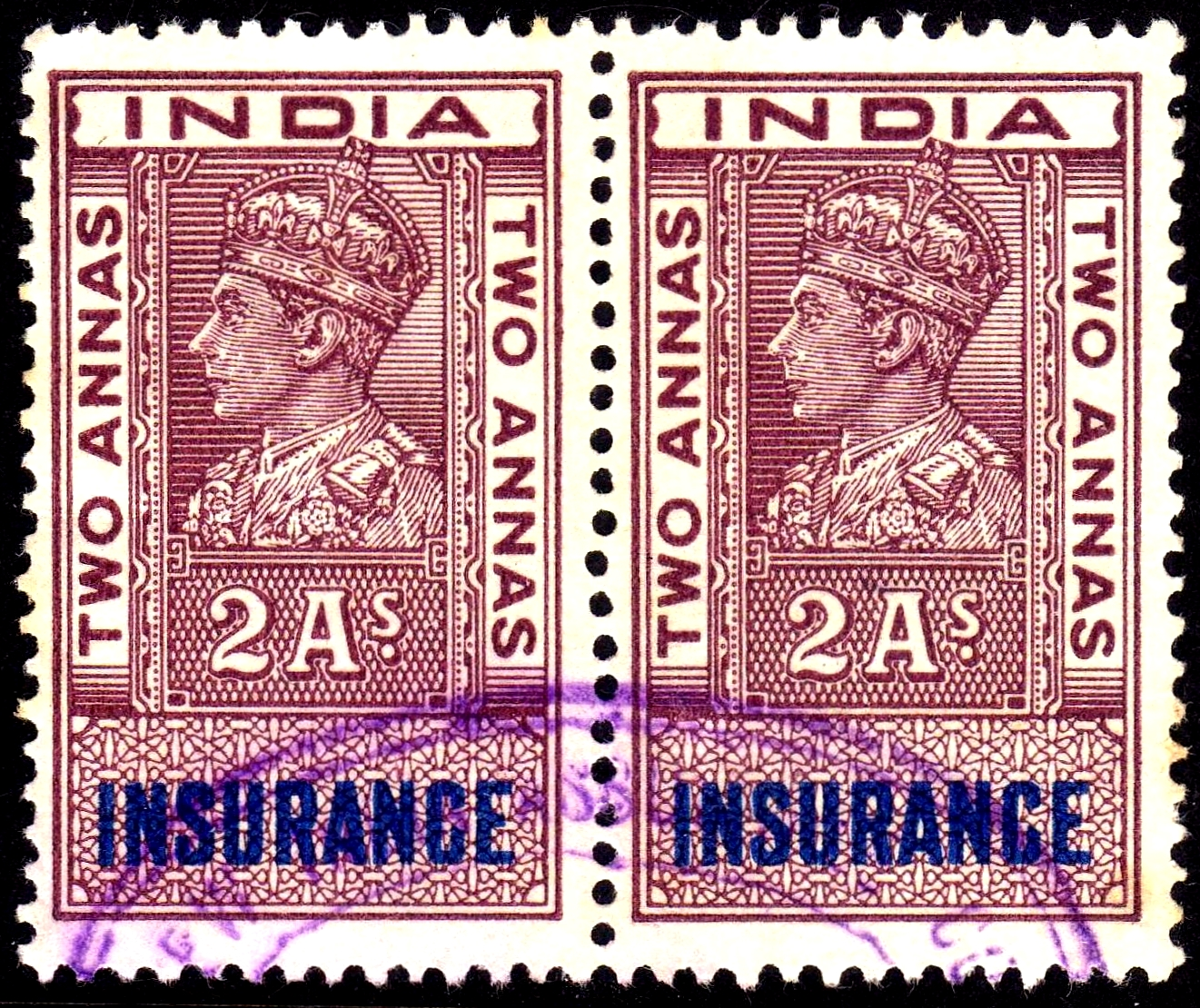
India

- Bangladesh, c.1978-c.1990 - Revenue stamps of Bangladesh
- Burma, 1937-1974 - Revenue stamps of Myanmar
- Cape of Good Hope, 1879 - Revenue stamps of the Cape of Good Hope
- Guernsey, 1935-1977 - Revenue stamps of Guernsey
- India, 1921-c.1980 - Revenue stamps of India
  - including various states
- Mauritius, 1869-1904
- Myanmar, c.1989-c.2005 - Revenue stamps of Myanmar
- Pakistan, 1947-c.2008 - Revenue stamps of Pakistan
- Somalia, 1946-1947

== Insurance Agent Licence Fee ==
- India, c.1940 - Revenue stamps of India
- Pakistan, c.1960 - Revenue stamps of Pakistan

== Internal Revenue ==
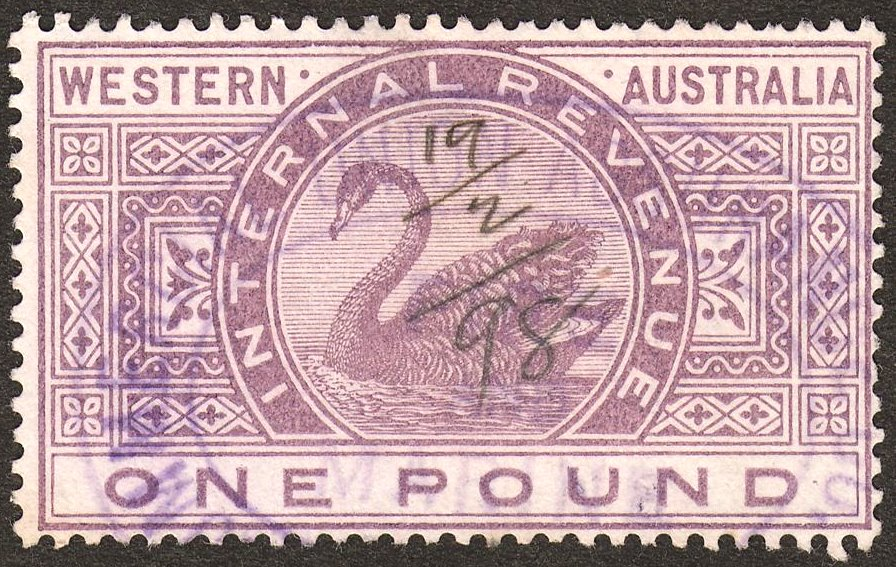
Western Australia

- Mauritius, 1869-1894
- Western Australia, 1881-1899 - Revenue stamps of Western Australia

== International Passenger Service ==
- India, 1966-1977 - Revenue stamps of India

== Jetty Tolls ==
- South Australia, 1915-1931 - Revenue stamps of South Australia

== Judicature ==
- Great Britain and Northern Ireland, 1875-1960 - Revenue stamps of the United Kingdom
- Ireland, 1878-1977 - Revenue stamps of Ireland
- Southern Ireland, 1922 - Revenue stamps of Ireland

== Judicial ==
- British East Africa, 1897-1901 - Revenue stamps of Kenya
- Ceylon, 1882-1906 - Revenue stamps of Sri Lanka
- East Africa and Uganda, c.1903-c.1908
- Federated Malay States, c.1900-c.1925 - Revenue stamps of Malaysia
- Gold Coast, 1899-1907
- Jamaica, 1898-1976 - Revenue stamps of Jamaica
- Johore, 1904-1922 - Revenue stamps of the Malay States
- Kenya, 1928-1930 - Revenue stamps of the Kenya
- Negri Sembilan, c.1890-c.1900 - Revenue stamps of the Malay States
- North Borneo, c.1916
- Northern Ireland, 1921-1971 - Revenue stamps of the United Kingdom
- Perak, c.1880-1899 - Revenue stamps of the Malay States
- Selangor, 1897-1902 - Revenue stamps of the Malay States
- Straits Settlements, 1868-c.1895 - Revenue stamps of Malaysia
- Sudan, 1982-1995 - Revenue stamps of Sudan
- Sungei Ujong, c.1893
- Syria, 1954-2000s - Revenue stamps of Syria
- Yemen, 1972 - Revenue stamps of Yemen

=== Judicial Court House ===
- Syria, 1961-1990s - Revenue stamps of Syria

== Juré-Justicier ==
- Jersey, 1922-1982 - Revenue stamps of Jersey

== Justice Court ==
- Winchester, 1888 - Revenue stamps of the United Kingdom

== Justice Fund ==
- Manitoba, 1886-1892 - Revenue stamps of Canada

== Justice Room ==
- Great Britain and Northern Ireland, 1869-c.1960 - Revenue stamps of the United Kingdom

== Land and Deeds ==
- New Zealand, 1877-1879 - Revenue stamps of New Zealand

== Land Charges ==
- Hampshire, 1962-1965 - Revenue stamps of the United Kingdom

== Land Commission ==
- Great Britain and Ireland, 1884 - Revenue stamps of the United Kingdom
- Northern Ireland, 1921 - Revenue stamps of the United Kingdom
- Ireland, 1881-1971 - Revenue stamps of Ireland

== Land Fees ==
- Syria, 1949-1990s - Revenue stamps of Syria

== Land Registry ==
- Basel-City, Switzerland, 1948 - Revenue stamps of Basel
- Great Britain and Northern Ireland, 1862-c.1983 - Revenue stamps of the United Kingdom
- Ireland, 1906-1980 - Revenue stamps of Ireland
- Northern Ireland, 1921-c.1974 - Revenue stamps of the United Kingdom
- Southern Ireland, 1922 - Revenue stamps of Ireland

== Land Titles Office ==
- Manitoba, c.1985 - Revenue stamps of Canada
- Morden, c.1985 - Revenue stamps of Canada
- Winnipeg, c.1985 - Revenue stamps of Canada

== Law Courts ==
- Great Britain and Northern Ireland, 1873-1959 - Revenue stamps of the United Kingdom
- New Zealand, 1875 - Revenue stamps of New Zealand
- Scotland, 1971 - Revenue stamps of the United Kingdom

== Law Library ==
- Halifax, 1879-c.1998 - Revenue stamps of Canada

== Law Society ==
- Canada, 1864-1865 - Revenue stamps of Canada
- Manitoba, 1877-1884 - Revenue stamps of Canada

== Law Stamp ==
- Alberta, 1906-1910 - Revenue stamps of Canada
- British Columbia, 1879-1981 - Revenue stamps of Canada
- Canada, 1876-c.1939 - Revenue stamps of Canada
- Cape Breton, 1903-1997 - Revenue stamps of Canada
- Lower Canada, 1864 - Revenue stamps of Canada
- Manitoba, 1892-1896 - Revenue stamps of Canada
- New Brunswick, 1884-1977 - Revenue stamps of Canada
- Ontario, 1870-1940 - Revenue stamps of Canada
- Quebec, 1871-c.1969 - Revenue stamps of Canada
- Saskatchewan, 1907-1948 - Revenue stamps of Canada

== Legacy Duty ==
- Orange Free State, 1885 - Revenue stamps of South Africa

== Legal Guardian Office ==
- Bern-City, Switzerland, c.1930 - Revenue stamps of Bern

== Licences ==
- Quebec, 1889-1912 - Revenue stamps of Canada

== Life Policy ==
- Great Britain and Ireland, 1854-1872 - Revenue stamps of the United Kingdom

== Livestock Export ==
- Ireland, c.1940-1979 - Revenue stamps of Ireland

== Local Government Tax ==
- Bechuanaland, c.1965 - Revenue stamps of Bechuanaland
- Botswana, c.1967-c.1976 - Revenue stamps of Bechuanaland

== Luxury Tax ==
- Great Britain and Ireland, 1918 (never actually issued) - Revenue stamps of the United Kingdom
- Ontario, 1926

== Magistrates' Courts ==
- Great Britain and Northern Ireland, 1962 - Revenue stamps of the United Kingdom

== Marine Policies ==
- Straits Settlements, 1869 - Revenue stamps of Malaysia

== Match Tax ==
- Burma, c.1937 - Revenue stamps of Myanmar
- Great Britain and Ireland, 1871 - Revenue stamps of the United Kingdom
- India, c.1925-c.1970 - Revenue stamps of India

== Matrimonial Cause ==
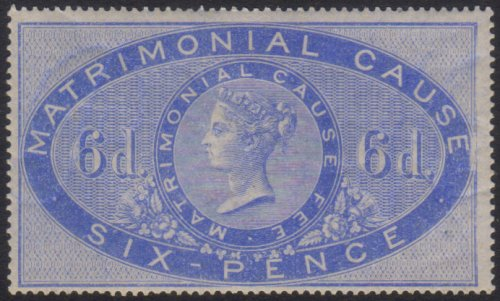
Six-pence Matrimonial Cause revenue stamp

- Great Britain and Ireland, 1858-1866 - Revenue stamps of the United Kingdom

== Mayor's Court ==
- Great Britain and Northern Ireland, 1883-1939 - Revenue stamps of the United Kingdom

== Medical Fee ==
- Libya, 1980s - Revenue stamps of Libya
- United Arab Emirates, 1988-c.2000 - Revenue stamps of United Arab Emirates

== Medicine Duty ==
- British Guiana, c.1900 - Revenue stamps of British Guiana and Guyana
- Canada, 1909-1919 - Revenue stamps of Canada
- Great Britain and Northern Ireland, 1783-1941 - Revenue stamps of the United Kingdom
- Sudan, 1969 - Revenue stamps of Sudan

=== Additional Medicine Duty ===
- Great Britain and Ireland, 1915 - Revenue stamps of the United Kingdom

== Metropolitan Police ==
- Great Britain and Ireland, 1907-1921 - Revenue stamps of the United Kingdom

== Military Tax ==
- Syria, 1945-1970s - Revenue stamps of Syria

== Mining Court ==
- Dawson, 1903

== Ministries ==
- Kuwait, c.1985-1992

== Money Order Tax ==
- Newfoundland, 1914 - Revenue stamps of Canada

== Monthly Pass Fee ==
- South West Africa, 1949-1952 - Revenue stamps of South Africa

== Mortgagee's Indemnity Fee ==
- New Zealand, 1927-1947 - Revenue stamps of New Zealand

== Motor Driver's Licence ==
- Uganda, 1933-1936 - Revenue stamps of Uganda

== Motor Transfer ==
- Victoria, c.1937 - Revenue stamps of Victoria

== Motor Vehicle Fitness Certificate ==
- Baluchistan, 2010–present - Revenue stamps of Pakistan
- Islamabad, 2010–present - Revenue stamps of Pakistan
- Punjab, 2010–present - Revenue stamps of Pakistan
- Sindh, 2000–present - Revenue stamps of Pakistan

== Motor Vehicles Tax ==
- Punjab, 1974-1977 - Revenue stamps of Pakistan
- Sindh, 1972 - Revenue stamps of Pakistan
- West Pakistan, 1970 - Revenue stamps of Pakistan

== National Health Insurance ==
- Great Britain and Ireland, 1912-1922 - Revenue stamps of the United Kingdom
- Isle of Man, 1920 - Revenue stamps of the Isle of Man

== National Insurance ==
- Barbados, 1966-c.1977 - Revenue stamps of Barbados
- Great Britain and Northern Ireland, 1948-1993 - Revenue stamps of the United Kingdom
- Ireland, 1922-1976 - Revenue stamps of Ireland
- Isle of Man, 1951-1974 - Revenue stamps of the Isle of Man
- Jamaica, 1965 - Revenue stamps of Jamaica
- Malta, 1956-1978 - Revenue stamps of Malta
- Northern Ireland, 1951-1972 - Revenue stamps of the United Kingdom
- Trinidad and Tobago, c.1960-c.1991 - Revenue stamps of Trinidad and Tobago

== National Parks and Wildlife Services ==
- Queensland, 1988 - Revenue stamps of Queensland

== Native Tax ==
- South Africa, 1942 - Revenue stamps of South Africa
- South West Africa, 1942-c.1960 - Revenue stamps of South Africa

== Naturalization ==
- Great Britain and Ireland, 1870 - Revenue stamps of the United Kingdom

== Notarial ==
- Aden, c.1937-1940s - Revenue stamps of Aden
- Bangladesh, 1977-1991 - Revenue stamps of Bangladesh
- Burma, 1948-1974 - Revenue stamps of Myanmar
- India, 1879-2010 - Revenue stamps of India
- Myanmar, 1989-c.1997 - Revenue stamps of Myanmar
- Pakistan, c.1992 - Revenue stamps of Pakistan
- Syria, 1940-2000s - Revenue stamps of Syria

== Official Arbitration ==
- Ireland, 1922-1971 - Revenue stamps of Ireland
- Northern Ireland, 1921 - Revenue stamps of the United Kingdom
- Southern Ireland, 1921 - Revenue stamps of Ireland

== Oil Cake Association ==
- Liverpool, c.1880 - Revenue stamps of the United Kingdom

== Old Age Pensions ==
- Falkland Islands, 1952-1978 - Revenue stamps of Falkland Islands
- Great Britain and Ireland, 1916 - Revenue stamps of the United Kingdom
- Ireland - Revenue stamps of Ireland

== Ottoman Public Debt Administration ==
- Egyptian Expeditionary Force, 1918-1919

== Palestine Tax ==
- Syria, 1948-1954 - Revenue stamps of Syria

== Papaw Levy ==
- Queensland, 1936-1951 - Revenue stamps of Queensland

== Paper Duty ==
- Great Britain and Ireland, 1820-1856 - Revenue stamps of the United Kingdom

== Pass ==
- Transvaal, 1901-1902 - Revenue stamps of Transvaal

== Passenger Service Charge ==
- Malawi, c.1980-1988 - Revenue stamps of Nyasaland and Malawi
- Nigeria, c.1983
- Seychelles, c.1980

== Passport ==
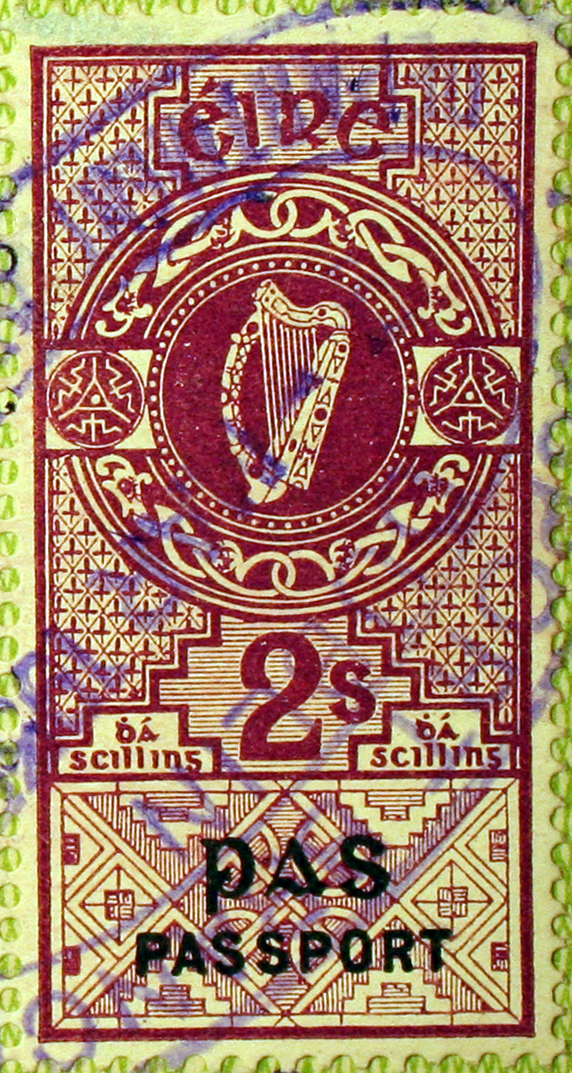
Ireland

- Bangladesh, 1972-c.1992 - Revenue stamps of Bangladesh
- Great Britain and Northern Ireland, c.1910-c.1946 - Revenue stamps of the United Kingdom
- India, c.1984 - Revenue stamps of India
- Ireland, 1925-c.1940 - Revenue stamps of Ireland
- Libya, 1988-2002 - Revenue stamps of Libya
- Malta, 1933-1969 - Revenue stamps of Malta
- New Zealand, 1926-1937 - Revenue stamps of New Zealand
- Pakistan, c.1950 - Revenue stamps of Pakistan
- Sudan, c.1927-c.1995 - Revenue stamps of Sudan
- Yemen, c.1956 - Revenue stamps of Yemen

== Patent ==
- Australia, 1953-1978 - Revenue stamps of Australia
- Great Britain and Ireland, 1853-1907 - Revenue stamps of the United Kingdom

== Patent and Proprietary ==
- Cape of Good Hope, 1909-1910 - Revenue stamps of the Cape of Good Hope

== Paymaster General's Service ==
- Great Britain and Ireland, 1890 - Revenue stamps of the United Kingdom

== Pedlar's Certificate ==
- Great Britain and Ireland, 1873-1879 - Revenue stamps of the United Kingdom

== Penalty ==
- Cape of Good Hope, 1911 - Revenue stamps of the Cape of Good Hope
- Ciskei, c.1988 - Revenue stamps of South Africa
- Cyprus, c.1960-1999 - Revenue stamps of Cyprus
- New Zealand, 1875 - Revenue stamps of New Zealand
- South Africa, 1913-2009 - Revenue stamps of South Africa
- South West Africa, c.1923-1968 - Revenue stamps of South Africa
- Transkei, c.1988 - Revenue stamps of South Africa
- Transvaal, 1913 - Revenue stamps of Transvaal
- Venda, c.1988 - Revenue stamps of South Africa
- Victoria, c.1907 - Revenue stamps of Victoria

== Perfume Duty ==
- Great Britain, 1786 - Revenue stamps of the United Kingdom

== Personal Tax ==
- Southern Rhodesia, 1961-1964 - Revenue stamps of Rhodesia

== Petition ==
- India, 1866 - Revenue stamps of India

== Petty Sessions ==
- Ireland, 1858-1922 - Revenue stamps of Ireland
- Northern Ireland, 1921-1971 - Revenue stamps of the United Kingdom
- Southern Ireland, 1921 - Revenue stamps of Ireland

== Pig Duty ==
- Western Australia, 1943-1955 - Revenue stamps of Western Australia

== Pineapple Levy ==
- Queensland, 1936-1951 - Revenue stamps of Queensland

== Playing Cards ==
- Canada, 1947 - Revenue stamps of Canada

== Police ==
- Basel-City, Switzerland, 1860-1940s - Revenue stamps of Basel
- Basel-Country, Switzerland, 1952 - Revenue stamps of Basel
- Bern-City, Switzerland, 1908-1939 - Revenue stamps of Bern

=== Police Courts ===
- Chatham and Sheerness c.1870-1875
- Great Britain and Northern Ireland, 1875-1959 - Revenue stamps of the United Kingdom

=== Police, Frontier ===
- Basel-City, Switzerland, 1917-1940s - Revenue stamps of Basel

=== Police Fund ===
- Sudan, 1998 - Revenue stamps of Sudan

== Poll Tax (Kodi) ==
- Kenya, 1936-1959 - Revenue stamps of Kanya
- Tanganyika, 1934-1962
- Uganda, 1940-1952 - Revenue stamps of Uganda

== Port Service Charge ==
- Tanzania, 1990s

== Post Office Savings Bank Receipt ==
- Great Britain and Ireland, 1912-1920 - Revenue stamps of the United Kingdom

== Postal Commission ==
- Ceylon, 1890 - Revenue stamps of Sri Lanka

== Postal Note / Postal Scrip ==
- Canada, 1932-1967 - Revenue stamps of Canada
- India, c.1870 - Revenue stamps of India

== Postal Service ==
- India, 1895-1904 - Revenue stamps of India

== Poster Tax ==
- Aargau, Switzerland, 1916 - Revenue stamps of Switzerland

== Postal Surcharge ==
- Cyprus, 1882-1883 - Revenue stamps of Cyprus

== Power Commission ==
- Saskatchewan, 1929-1947 - Revenue stamps of Canada
- Saskatoon, 1911-1927 - Revenue stamps of Canada

== Precise and Correct Taxes ==
- Syria, 1960s - Revenue stamps of Syria

== Prescription Charge ==
- Great Britain and Northern Ireland, c.1960-c.1990 - Revenue stamps of the United Kingdom

== Prohibition ==
- Quebec, 1909 - Revenue stamps of Canada

== Probate Duty ==
- Great Britain and Ireland, 1858-1921 - Revenue stamps of the United Kingdom
- New Brunswick, 1895-1977 - Revenue stamps of Canada
- Western Australia, 1903-1922 - Revenue stamps of Western Australia

== Producers Association ==
- Queensland, 1924 - Revenue stamps of Queensland

== Property Guarantee Fund ==
- Jersey, 1915 - Revenue stamps of Jersey

== Provision Association ==
- Liverpool, c.1883 - Revenue stamps of the United Kingdom

== Public Records ==
- Great Britain and Northern Ireland, 1868-1960 - Revenue stamps of the United Kingdom
- Ireland, 1922-1971 - Revenue stamps of Ireland

=== Public Records (Land Revenue Records and Inrolments) ===
- Great Britain and Northern Ireland, 1904-c.1940 - Revenue stamps of the United Kingdom

== Public Health Service ==
- Basel-City, Switzerland, 1937-1942 - Revenue stamps of Basel

== Racing Service Duty ==
- Barbados, c.2000 - Revenue stamps of Barbados

== Radio Licence ==
- Bangladesh, 1981-1991 - Revenue stamps of Bangladesh
- Singapore, 1971 - Revenue stamps of Singapore

=== Broadcasting Radio Licence Fee ===
- India, 1965-1985 - Revenue stamps of India

=== Citizens' Band Radio Licence Fee ===
- Great Britain and Northern Ireland, 1981-c.1990 - Revenue stamps of the United Kingdom

== Railway Rates Tribunal ==
- Great Britain and Ireland, 1922 - Revenue stamps of the United Kingdom

== Receipt / Draft or Receipt ==
- Ceylon, 1862-1872 - Revenue stamps of Sri Lanka
- Great Britain and Ireland, 1853-1856 - Revenue stamps of the United Kingdom
- Hong Kong, c.1946-1948 - Revenue stamps of Hong Kong
- India, 1860-1861 - Revenue stamps of India
  - including various states
- Sarawak, 1875-1885 - Revenue stamps of Sarawak
- Straits Settlements, 1863-c.1880 - Revenue stamps of Malaysia
- West Pakistan, 1947 - Revenue stamps of Pakistan

== Record of Titles ==
- Ireland, 1865-1882 - Revenue stamps of Ireland

== Records ==
- Ireland, 1893-1922 - Revenue stamps of Ireland

== Refugee ==
- India, 1971 - Revenue stamps of India
- Pakistan, c.1950 - Revenue stamps of Pakistan
- Transvaal, 1903 - Revenue stamps of Transvaal

== Register House ==
- Scotland, 1871-1959

== Registers ==
- Malta, 1925 - Revenue stamps of Malta

== Registrar of Companies ==
- New South Wales, 1961-1966 - Revenue stamps of New South Wales

== Registrar's Office ==
- Sudan, c.1990 - Revenue stamps of Sudan

== Registration ==
- Lower Canada, 1868 - Revenue stamps of Canada
- Quebec, 1871-1971 - Revenue stamps of Canada

== Registration of Deeds ==
- Ireland, 1861-1971 - Revenue stamps of Ireland
- Northern Ireland, 1949-1971 - Revenue stamps of the United Kingdom

== Registration of Title ==
- Ireland, 1890-1909 - Revenue stamps of Ireland

=== Registration of Title Insurance Fund ===
- Ireland, 1890-1902 - Revenue stamps of Ireland

== Registry Office ==
- Basel-City, Switzerland, 1911-1958 - Revenue stamps of Basel

== Relief Tax ==
- New South Wales, c.1930 - Revenue stamps of New South Wales
- Victoria, 1930 - Revenue stamps of Victoria

== Rent Contract ==
- Iraq, 1917 - Revenue stamps of Iraq

== Revenue / Inland Revenue (inc. municipals) ==
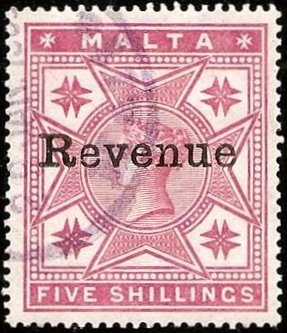
Malta

- Abu Dhabi, c.1969-c.1990
- Aden, 1937-c.1940 - Revenue stamps of Aden
- Alaouites, 1939-1943
- Alderney, 1923-1939
- Alexandretta, 1938-1939
- Asmara, 1945-1952
- Bahrain, 1924-1992
- Bangladesh, 1973-2002 - Revenue stamps of Bangladesh
- Barbados, 1916-1999 - Revenue stamps of Barbados
- Basutoland, 1900-c.1967 - Revenue stamps of Basutoland and Lesotho
- Batum, 1918
- Bechuanaland, 1903-1961 - Revenue stamps of Bechuanaland
- Bermuda, c.1936-1984 - Revenue stamps of Bermuda
- Bophuthatswana, c.1988 - Revenue stamps of South Africa
- Botswana, c.1968-1976 - Revenue stamps of Bechuanaland
- British Bechuanaland, 1886-1887 - Revenue stamps of Bechuanaland
- British Central Africa, 1891-1893
- British East Africa, 1891-c.1898 - Revenue stamps of Kenya
- British Guiana, 1869-c.1913
- British Honduras, 1899
- British Solomon Islands, c.1920-c.1968
- British Somaliland, 1900
- British South Africa Company (Rhodesia), 1890-c.1920
- British Virgin Islands, 1988-2003
- Burma, 1943 - Revenue stamps of Myanmar
- Cape of Good Hope, 1864-1903 - Revenue stamps of the Cape of Good Hope
- Cayman Islands, 1908-1980
- Ceylon, 1938-1961 - Revenue stamps of Sri Lanka
- Ciskei, c.1988
- Cook Islands, 1921-1967
- Crete, 1898
  - Kandia
  - Kenurio and Pyiotissa
  - Malevisi
  - Monofatsi
  - Pediada
  - Temenos
- Cyprus, 1878-2008 - Revenue stamps of Cyprus
- Cyrenaica, 1947-1963
- Dominica, 1878-1887
- Durban, 1957-c.1970 - Revenue stamps of South Africa
- Eastern Nigeria, c.1956-c.1957
- Egyptian Expeditionary Force, 1917-1918
- Eritrea, 1943-1960 and 1991-1997
- Federated Malay States, 1910-c.1939 - Revenue stamps of Malaysia
- Fezzan, 1950s - Revenue stamps of Libya
- German South West Africa, 1900-1904 - Revenue stamps of South Africa
- Gloucestershire, 1870-1878 - Revenue stamps of the United Kingdom
- Great Britain and Ireland, 1855-1959 - Revenue stamps of the United Kingdom
- Grenada, 1875-1965
- Griqualand West, 1877-1879 - Revenue stamps of South Africa
- Guernsey, 1903-1961 - Revenue stamps of Guernsey
- Guyana, 1975-c.2002 - Revenue stamps of British Guiana and Guyana
- Haifa, c.1945
- Hatay, 1938-1939
- Hong Kong, c.1943-1945 - Revenue stamps of Hong Kong
- India, 1869–present - Revenue stamps of India
  - including various states
- Iraq, 1915-1932 - Revenue stamps of Iraq
- Ireland, 1892-1923 - Revenue stamps of Ireland
- Isle of Ely, 1870-1882 - Revenue stamps of the United Kingdom
- Isle of Man, 1889-1976 - Revenue stamps of the Isle of Man
- Italian East Africa, 1945-1948
- Jamaica, 1855-c.1956 - Revenue stamps of Jamaica
- Jebel Druze, 1939-1943
- Jersey, 1900–present - Revenue stamps of Jersey
- Jerusalem, c.1918
- Johore, 1904-1950 - Revenue stamps of the Malay States
- Kedah, 1929-1950 - Revenue stamps of the Malay States
- Kelantan, 1937-1950 - Revenue stamps of the Malay States
- Kenya, c.1954-2010 - Revenue stamps of Kenya
- Kuwait, 1954-2012
- Labuan, c.1905
- Lagos, 1938
- Lesotho, 1968-c.2006
- Libya, c.1951-2009 - Revenue stamps of Libya
- Malacca, 1950 - Revenue stamps of the Malay States
- Malaya, 1942-c.1975 - Revenue stamps of the Malaysia
- Malaysia, 1975-2009 - Revenue stamps of the Malayasia
- Maldives, 1960-1981
- Malta, 1899-1956 - Revenue stamps of Malta
- Mauritius, 1889-1898
- Mogadishu, c.2000
- Montserrat, 1866-1887
- Muscat and Oman, c.1930
- Myanmar, 1991 - Revenue stamps of Myanmar
- Namibia, 1990-2006
- Natal, c.1855-1910 - Revenue stamps of South Africa
- Negri Sembilan, c.1891-1950 - Revenue stamps of the Malay States
- Nevis, 1877-1883
- New Republic, 1886 - Revenue stamps of Transvaal
- Newfoundland, 1898-1970 - Revenue stamps of Canada
- Nigeria, 1916-1920 - Revenue stamps of Nigeria
- North Borneo, 1886-c.1942
- Northamptonshire, 1870-1882 - Revenue stamps of the United Kingdom
- Northern Cyprus, 1962-1999 - Revenue stamps of Northern Cyprus
- Northern Rhodesia, 1925-c.1955 - Revenue stamps of Northern Rhodesia
- Nyasaland, c.1921-1955 - Revenue stamps of Nyasaland and Malawi
- Oman, 1945-c.2000
- Orange Free State (Orange River Colony), 1856-1907
- Pahang, c.1890-1950 - Revenue stamps of the Malay States
- Pakistan, 1947-c.1985 - Revenue stamps of Pakistan
- Palestine, 1928 - Revenue stamps of Palestine
- Penang, 1942-1949 - Revenue stamps of the Malay States
- Perak, c.1888-1952 - Revenue stamps of the Malay States
- Perlis, 1951 - Revenue stamps of the Malay States
- Portuguese India, 1962 - Revenue stamps of India
- Qatar, c.1961-1996
- Rarotonga, 1921-1931
- Rhodesia, 1966-1980 - Revenue stamps of Rhodesia
- Rhodesia and Nyasaland, 1956
- Saint Christopher, 1883-1884
- Saint Kitts Nevis, 1884-1886
- Saint Lucia, 1882-1884 and 1992
- Saint Vincent, 1881-1894 and c.1984-2006
- Sarawak, c.1889-1942 - Revenue stamps of Sarawak
- Selangor, c.1880-1950 - Revenue stamps of Malay States
- Seychelles, 1894-1922
- Shan States, 1944
- Sierra Leone, 1884
- Singapore, 1948-c.1990 - Revenue stamps of Singapore
- Somalia, 1943-1990s
- South Africa, 1913-2009 - Revenue stamps of South Africa
- South African Republic, 1875-c.1878 and 1886 - Revenue stamps of Transvaal
- South West Africa, 1923-1970 - Revenue stamps of South Africa
- Southern Rhodesia, 1924-1954 - Revenue stamps of Rhodesia
- Southern Yemen, 1969 - Revenue stamps of Yemen
- Sri Lanka, 1979-2002 - Revenue stamps of Sri Lanka
- Stellaland, 1884-1886 - Revenue stamps of Bechuanaland
- Straits Settlements, 1874-1938 - Revenue stamps of Malaysia
- Sudan, 1962-c.1998 - Revenue stamps of Sudan
- Sungei Ujong, c.1880-c.1890 - Revenue stamps of the Malay States
- Swaziland, 1890-c.2007
- Syburi, 1944 - Revenue stamps of the Malay States
- Syria, 1938-2007 - Revenue stamps of Syria
- Tati Concessions Limited, 1896 - Revenue stamps of Bechuanaland
- Tel Aviv, c.1935-1944
- Tobago, 1879-1890 - Revenue stamps of Trinidad and Tobago
- Transjordan, 1920-c.1942
- Transkei, c.1988 - Revenue stamps of South Africa
- Transvaal, 1877-1884 and 1900-1906 - Revenue stamps of Transvaal
- Trengganu, 1942-1950 - Revenue stamps of the Malay States
- Trinidad and Tobago, 1908-1964 - Revenue stamps of Trinidad and Tobago
- Tripoli, c.1945-1963
- Tripolitania, 1945-1959 - Revenue stamps of Libya
- Uganda, c.1898-c.1970 - Revenue stamps of Uganda
- United Arab Emirates, c.1973-1992 - Revenue stamps of the United Arab Emirates
- Venda, c.1988 - Revenue stamps of South Africa
- Weihaiwei, 1921-c.1926 - Revenue stamps of Weihaiwei
- Western Australia, 1941-1973 - Revenue stamps of Western Australia
- Yemen (Arab Republic), 1971-1983 - Revenue stamps of Yemen
- Yemen (People's Democratic Republic), 1970s-c.1980 - Revenue stamps of Yemen
- Zambia, 1964-1968 - Revenue stamps of Rhodesia
- Zanzibar, 1892-1970 - Revenue stamps of Zanzibar
- Zimbabwe, 1981-c.2009 - Revenue stamps of Zimbabwe
- Zululand, 1888-1892 - Revenue stamps of Rhodesia

== Route Permit ==
- Punjab, 1997–present - Revenue stamps of Pakistan
- Sindh, 1981–present - Revenue stamps of Pakistan

== Sales Tax ==
- Guernsey, 1940-1946 - Revenue stamps of Guernsey
- Somalia, 1960s

== Sea Departure Fee ==
- Yemen, 1971 - Revenue stamps of Yemen
- Zanzibar, c.1993 - Revenue stamps of Zanzibar

== Search Fee ==
- Manitoba, 1920-c.1990 - Revenue stamps of Canada

== Secretariat Fees ==
- Mogadishu, 1952

== Share Transfer ==
- Bangladesh, 1978-c.1982 - Revenue stamps of Bangladesh
- Burma, 1937-1953 - Revenue stamps of Myanmar
- India, 1863-1975 - Revenue stamps of India
  - including various states
- Pakistan, c.1947-c.1995 - Revenue stamps of Pakistan

== Small Cause Court ==
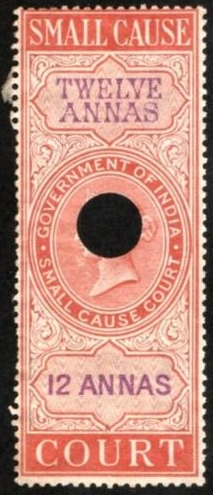
India

- India, 1868 - Revenue stamps of India
  - Calcutta, 1868-1964 - Revenue stamps of India
  - Madras, 1869-1872 - Revenue stamps of India

== Social Assurance / Social Insurance / Social Security ==
- Cyprus, 1956-c.1970 - Revenue stamps of Cyprus
- Falkland Islands, 1953-1962
- Gibraltar, c.1971-1976 - Revenue stamps of Gibraltar
- India, 1952-c.1973 - Revenue stamps of India
- Jamaica, 1976-c.2000 - Revenue stamps of Jamaica
- Jersey, 1936-c.1975 - Revenue stamps of Jersey
- Malaysia, 1971-1973 - Revenue stamps of Malaysia
- New Zealand, 1939-1958 - Revenue stamps of New Zealand
- Northern Cyprus, 1970-2001 - Revenue stamps of Northern Cyprus
- Somalia, c.1943-1949
- Sudan, 1975-1979 - Revenue stamps of Sudan

== Special Adhesive ==
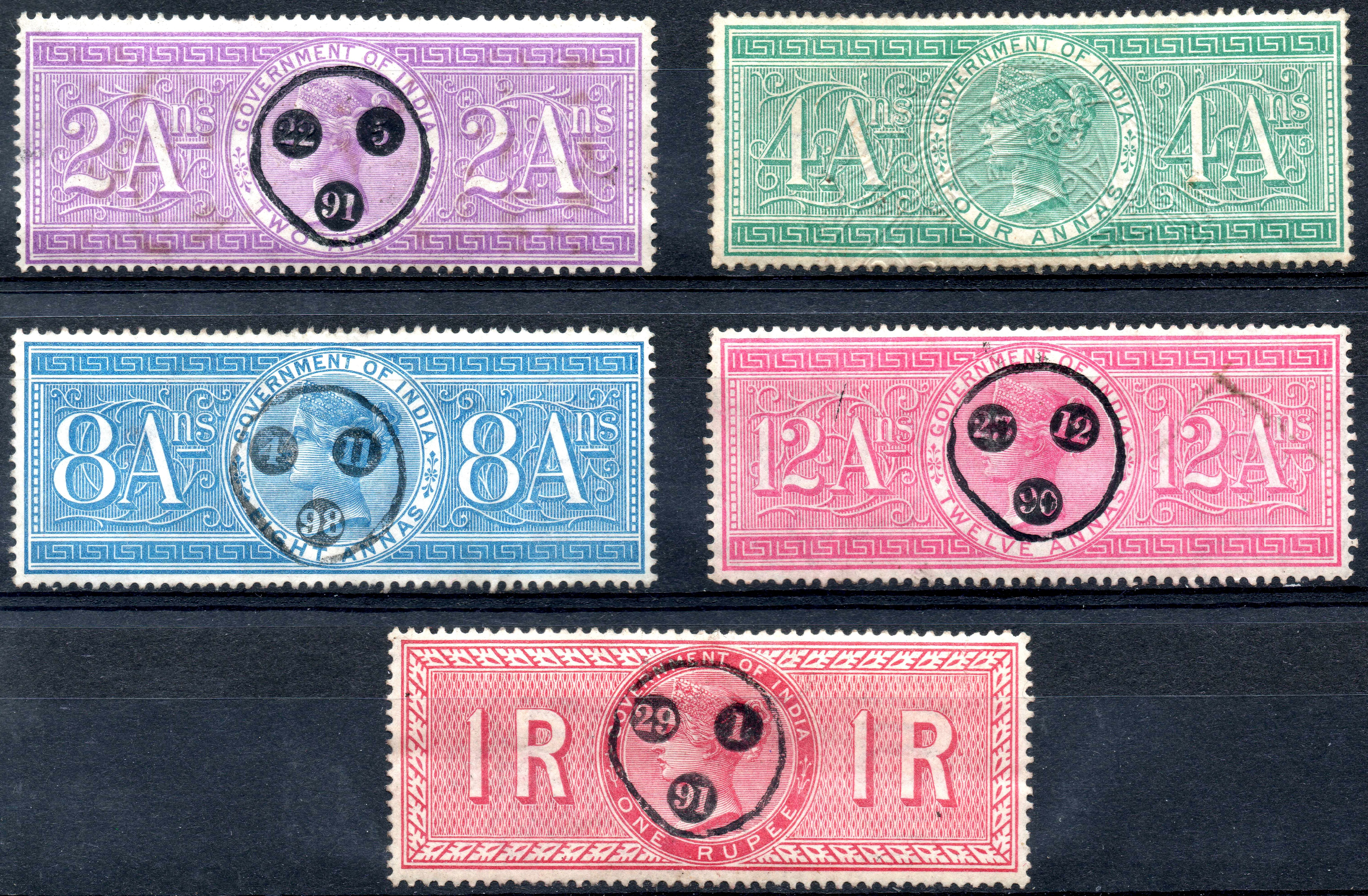
India

- Bangladesh, 1973-1987 - Revenue stamps of Bangladesh
- Burma, 1937-c.1980 - Revenue stamps of Myanmar
- India, 1866-c.1975 - Revenue stamps of India
  - including various states
- Myanmar, c.1997-2007 - Revenue stamps of Myanmar
- Pakistan, 1947-2003 - Revenue stamps of Pakistan

== Stamp Duty ==
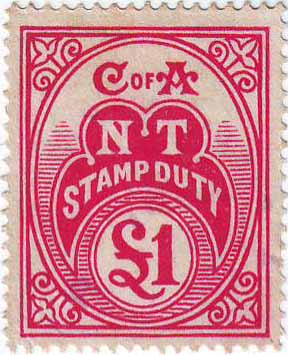
Northern Territory

- Antigua, 1870-1876 - Revenue stamps of Antigua
- Australian Capital Territory, 1966-1983 - Revenue stamps of the Australian Capital Territory
- Ceylon, 1872-1905 - Revenue stamps of Sri Lanka
- Fiji, 1871-1922
- Gibraltar, 1884-1898 - Revenue stamps of Gibraltar
- Hong Kong, 1867-c.1990 - Revenue stamps of Hong Kong
- New Guinea, 1928-c.1935
- New South Wales, 1865-1998 - Revenue stamps of New South Wales
- New Zealand, 1866-1986 - Revenue stamps of New Zealand
- Niuafo'ou, c.1986-c.1990
- Niue, 1918-1967
- Northern Territory (North Australia), 1917-c.1990 - Revenue stamps of the Northern Territory
- Papua, 1907-1949
- Papua New Guinea, 1949-c.2000
- Queensland, 1866-1901 - Revenue stamps of Queensland
- Saint Lucia, 1881
- Saint Vincent, 1980
- Samoa, 1914-1931 and 1967-c.1973
- Sierra Leone, 1886-1894
- South Australia, 1902-2003 - Revenue stamps of South Australia
- Tanganyika, 1950-c.2000
- Tasmania, 1863-1970 - Revenue stamps of Tasmania
- Tokelau, 1966-1967
- Tonga, 1995-1998
- Victoria, 1879-1981 - Revenue stamps of Victoria
- Western Australia, 1904-1930 - Revenue stamps of Western Australia
- Western Samoa, 1935-1955
- Yemen, 1940s-1995 - Revenue stamps of Yemen

=== Adhesive Stamp Duty ===
- Queensland, 1918-c.1980 - Revenue stamps of Queensland

=== Duty Paid in Full ===
- New Zealand, c.1868 - Revenue stamps of New Zealand

=== Impressed Stamp Duty ===
- Queensland, 1895-1966 - Revenue stamps of Queensland

=== Not Liable ===
- New Zealand, 1875-1931 - Revenue stamps of New Zealand

=== Stamp Duty Duly Stamped ===
- Victoria, c.1889-c.1905 - Revenue stamps of Victoria

=== Stamp Duty Exempt ===
- Victoria, c.1897-c.1915 - Revenue stamps of Victoria

=== Stamp Duty Reimbursement Fees ===
- Mogadishu, 1952

== Stamp Statute ==
- Victoria, 1870-1882 - Revenue stamps of Victoria

== State Service ==
- Ireland, 1925-1971 - Revenue stamps of Ireland

== Stocks, Shares and Bonds ==
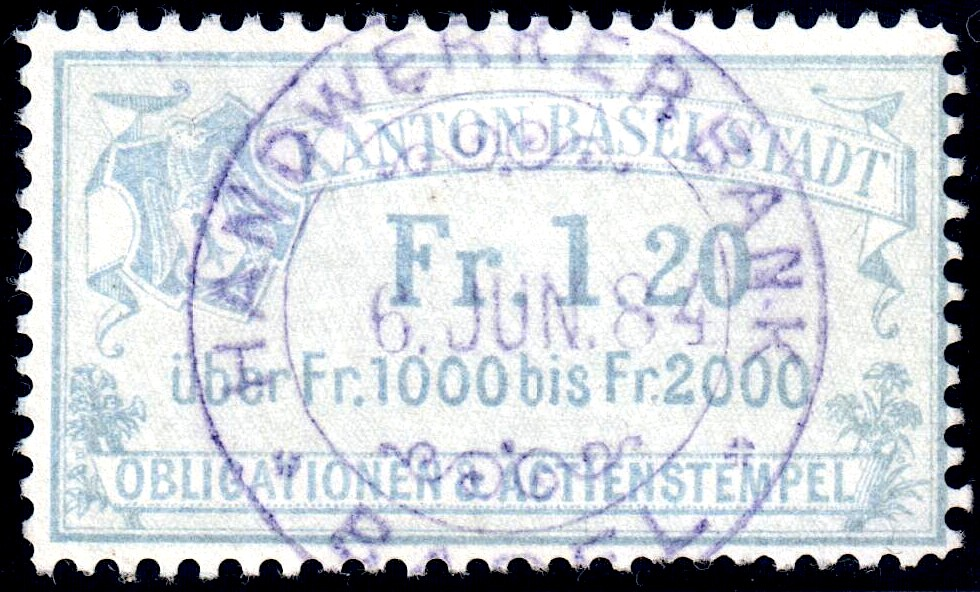
Basel City

- Basel-City, Switzerland, 1883 - Revenue stamps of Basel
- Malta, 1925 - Revenue stamps of Malta

== Student Accident Insurance ==
- Basel-City, Switzerland, 1922-1956 - Revenue stamps of Basel

== Summary Jurisdiction ==
- British Guiana, 1865-1887 - Revenue stamps of Australia

== Supreme Court ==
- Samoa, c.1920
- Western Australia, 1903-1922 - Revenue stamps of Western Australia

== Swine ==
- New South Wales, 1928-1966 - Revenue stamps of New South Wales
- Queensland, 1962-c.1969 - Revenue stamps of Queensland
- South Australia, 1937-c.1985 - Revenue stamps of South Australia
- Victoria, 1928-1966 - Revenue stamps of Victoria

== Table Water Duty ==
- Great Britain and Ireland, 1916 - Revenue stamps of the United Kingdom

== Tax Instalment ==
- Australia, 1944-1990 - Revenue stamps of Australia
- New South Wales, 1941-1944 - Revenue stamps of New South Wales
- Northern Territory, 1941 - Revenue stamps of Northern Territory
- Queensland, 1941-1944 - Revenue stamps of Queensland
- South Australia, 1941-1944 - Revenue stamps of South Australia
- Tasmania, 1940-1944 - Revenue stamps of Tasmania
- Victoria, 1933-1944 - Revenue stamps of Victoria
- Western Australia, 1940-1944 - Revenue stamps of Western Australia

== Tea Clearing House ==
- Great Britain and Northern Ireland, 1923-c.1958 - Revenue stamps of the United Kingdom

== Television Licence ==
- Great Britain and Northern Ireland, 1972-1997 - Revenue stamps of the United Kingdom
- Singapore, 1969-1988 - Revenue stamps of Singapore

== Territorial Court ==
- Yukon, 1903-1951 - Revenue stamps of Canada

== Tobacco Duty Relief ==
- Great Britain and Northern Ireland, 1947-1958 - Revenue stamps of the United Kingdom

== Tobacco Tax ==
- New Brunswick, 1940-1941 - Revenue stamps of Canada
- North Borneo, 1943
- Prince Edward Island, 1942 - Revenue stamps of Canada
- South West Africa, 1925-1937 - Revenue stamps of South Africa
- Sudan, 1960 - Revenue stamps of Sudan

== Tomato Levy ==
- Queensland, 1939-1951 - Revenue stamps of Queensland

== Tourism ==
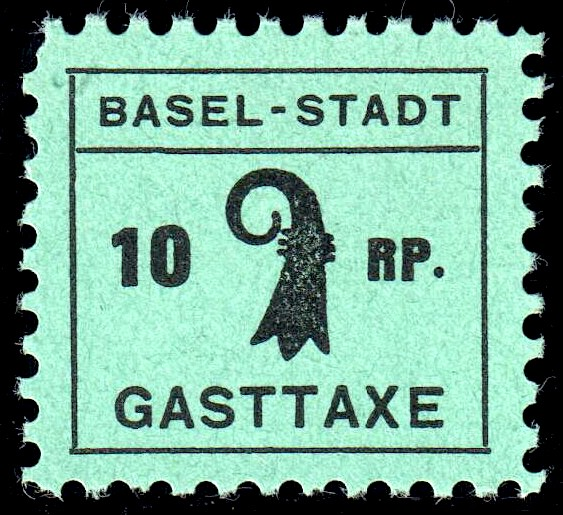
Basel-City

- Basel-City, Switzerland, 1942-1956 - Revenue stamps of Basel

== Town Hall ==
- Sheffield, 1891 - Revenue stamps of the United Kingdom

== Trade Development Board ==
- Singapore, 1983 - Revenue stamps of Singapore

== Trade Mark ==
- Great Britain and Ireland, 1907 - Revenue stamps of the United Kingdom

== Transfer Duty ==
- Great Britain and Ireland, 1888-1893 - Revenue stamps of the United Kingdom
- Ontario, 1910-1969 - Revenue stamps of Canada
- Quebec, 1907-1913 - Revenue stamps of Canada

== Traffic Offence Fine ==
- Bangladesh, 1990-2002 - Revenue stamps of Bangladesh

== Transport Tribunal ==
- Great Britain and Northern Ireland, 1947-1959 - Revenue stamps of the United Kingdom

== Transportation Tax ==
- Newfoundland, 1927 - Revenue stamps of Canada
- Punjab, c.1980 - Revenue stamps of Pakistan

== Travel Identity Card ==
- Great Britain and Northern Ireland, 1948-1949 - Revenue stamps of the United Kingdom

== Travel Permit ==
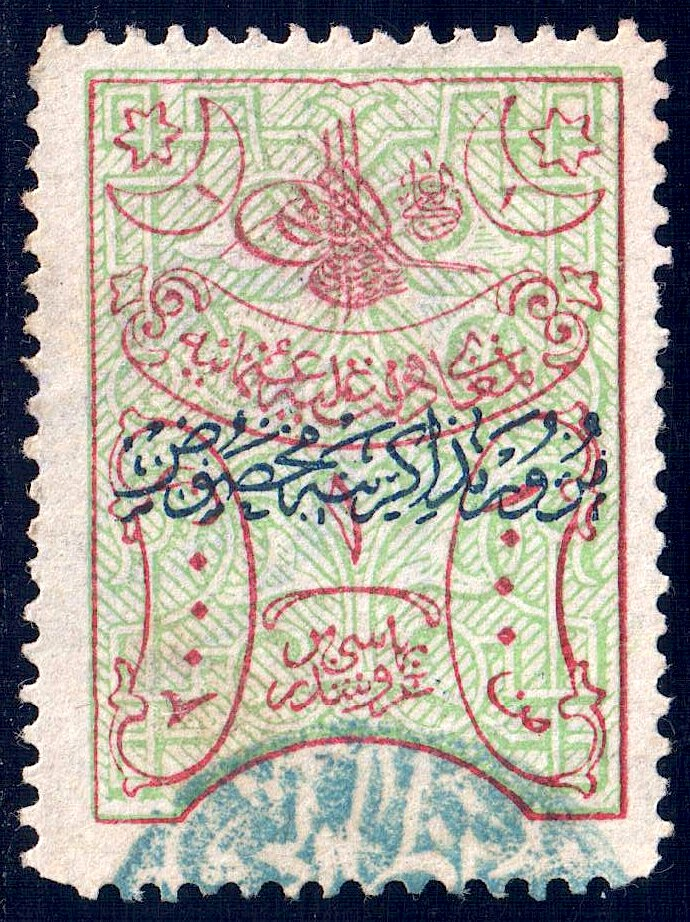
Turkey, travel permit revenue

- Great Britain and Northern Ireland, 1939-1945 - Revenue stamps of the United Kingdom
- Turkey, 1890 - Revenue stamps of Turkey

== Tribal Tax ==
- South West Africa - Revenue stamps of South Africa
  - Basubia, 1931
  - Gobobia
  - Grootfontain
  - Mafuri (Bayai), 1931
  - Okavango, c.1940-1949
  - Omaruru
  - Ombalantu, c.1920-1953
  - Ondonga, 1931-c.1961
  - Ongandjera, 1931-1953
  - Otjiwarongo
  - Ovambo, 1931-1953
  - Ovambo-kushu, 1931
  - Ukualuthi, 1931-c.1940
  - Ukuambi, c.1920-1953
  - Ukuanyama, c.1920-1949

== Unemployment Insurance ==
- Basel-Country, Switzerland, 1933 - Revenue stamps of Basel
- Canada, 1941-1968 - Revenue stamps of Canada
- Great Britain and Northern Ireland, 1912-1948 - Revenue stamps of the United Kingdom
- Ireland, 1922-c.1977 - Revenue stamps of Ireland
- Quebec, 1934 - Revenue stamps of Canada
- Queensland, 1923-1945 - Revenue stamps of Queensland

=== Agriculture Unemployment Insurance ===
- Great Britain and Northern Ireland, 1936 - Revenue stamps of the United Kingdom

== Unemployment Relief ==
- New South Wales, 1939-1941 - Revenue stamps of New South Wales
- New Zealand, 1931-1936 - Revenue stamps of New Zealand
- Queensland, 1930-1933 - Revenue stamps of Queensland

== Vacation Pay ==
- Manitoba, c.1955-c.1960 - Revenue stamps of Canada
- New Brunswick, 1958 - Revenue stamps of Canada
- Nova Scotia, 1958 - Revenue stamps of Canada
- Ontario, c.1955 - Revenue stamps of Canada
- Quebec, 1958-c.1959 - Revenue stamps of Canada

== Vakil ==
- India, c.1875-c.1920 - Revenue stamps of India

== Value Added Tax ==
- Channel Islands, 1973 - Revenue stamps of Guernsey - Revenue stamps of Jersey

== Vegetable Levy ==
- Queensland, 1946-1951 - Revenue stamps of Queensland

== Vehicle Licence ==
- Bangladesh, 1977-1980 - Revenue stamps of Bangladesh
- Great Britain and Northern Ireland, 1980-1985 - Revenue stamps of the United Kingdom

== Vehicle Permit ==
- Bangladesh, 1977-1992 - Revenue stamps of Bangladesh

== Vehicle Registration ==
- India, c.1995 - Revenue stamps of India

== Vehicle Tax ==
- Bangladesh, 1977-1991 - Revenue stamps of Bangladesh

== Vehicle Test Fee ==
- Bangladesh, 1982-1991 - Revenue stamps of Bangladesh

== Vehicle Transport ==
- Bangladesh, 1990 - Revenue stamps of Bangladesh

== Wages Tax ==
- New South Wales, 1933-1939 - Revenue stamps of New South Wales
- Tasmania, 1935-1937 - Revenue stamps of Tasmania

== War Tax ==
- Bahrain, c.1967-1973 - Revenue stamps of Bahrain
- Basel-City, Switzerland, 1941 - Revenue stamps of Basel
- Canada, 1915 - Revenue stamps of Canada
- Libya, 1970-1984 - Revenue stamps of Libya

== Warehouse Warrant ==
- Ceylon, 1871-1906 - Revenue stamps of Sri Lanka

== Weights and Measures ==
- Canada, 1867-1930 - Revenue stamps of Canada

== Welfare ==
- Pakistan, c.1972 - Revenue stamps of Pakistan

== West Riding Registry ==
- Great Britain and Ireland, 1907 - Revenue stamps of the United Kingdom

== Wet Time (Unemployment Insurance) ==
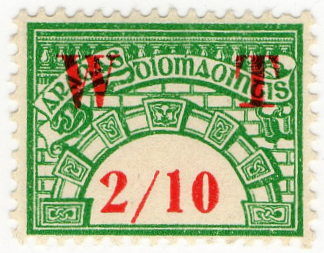
1960 Wet Time unemployment insurance stamp rated two shillings and ten pence

- Ireland - Revenue stamps of Ireland

== Workmen's Compensation ==
- Guernsey, 1925 - Revenue stamps of Guernsey
- Malta, 1929-1956 - Revenue stamps of Malta
