= Revenue stamps of Guernsey =

Revenue stamps of Guernsey refer to the various revenue or fiscal stamps, whether adhesive or directly embossed, which were issued by the States of Guernsey for use on the island of Guernsey, a British Crown dependency. There were general-duty revenues, along with issues for Entertainments Tax, Sales Tax, Income Tax and Insurance.

Alderney, a part of Guernsey, also issued revenue stamps from 1923 to 1962.

== See also ==
- Postage stamps and postal history of Guernsey
- Revenue stamps of the Isle of Man
- Revenue stamps of Jersey
- Revenue stamps of the United Kingdom
