= Revenue stamps of Aden =

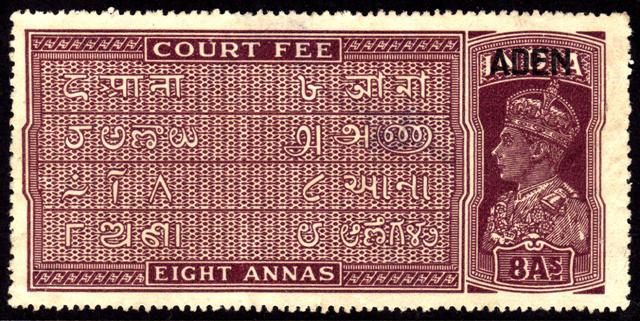
A 1937 Indian Court Fee stamp overprinted for use in Aden.

The British colony of Aden, which is now part of Yemen, issued revenue stamps from 1937 to around 1945. Prior to having its own issues, Aden had used revenue stamps of India.

== Court Fee ==
The first set of Aden Court Fee stamps was India's King George V stamps overprinted. Only the 8a and 1r values are recorded, but possibly more exist. The King George VI stamps were also similarly overprinted. Thirteen values were issued, ranging from 2a to 20r.

== Notarial ==
Only two stamps were issued, and they were Indian 2r Notarial stamps of Kings George V and VI overprinted ADEN at the top of the stamp.

== Revenue ==
The first set of Aden Revenue stamps was India's King George V keytype with the inscription ADEN REVENUE at foot, with values from 2a to 10r. Around 1945, a similar set was issued but with the portrait of King George VI and with values ranging to 50r.

== See also ==
- Postage stamps and postal history of Aden
