= Revenue stamps of Trinidad and Tobago =

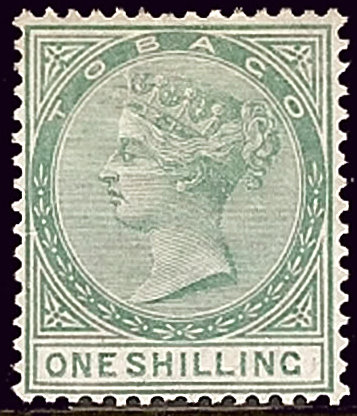
The 1s stamp from Tobago's first revenue issue of 1879.

Trinidad and Tobago, formerly administered as two separate colonies, issued revenue stamps from 1879 to around 1991.

== Separate issues ==
=== Tobago ===
Tobago first issued revenues in 1879. A set of six values from 1d to £1 was issued, and in 1884 they were reprinted in a different watermark. A third set of six was issued in 1890 with the same values in new colours. Some Tobago revenue stamps were also valid for postal use pending the delivery of stamps marked POSTAGE. Tobago used Trinidad revenues from 1896 until joint issues appeared in 1908.

=== Trinidad ===
The first Trinidad revenue was issued in 1887 and consisted of a 1d postage stamp of 1883 overprinted FEE. Other values were prepared but none were issued, since later that year a new set with values from ½d to 5s was issued. A year later 10s and £1 values were added to this series (by surcharging 5s stamps). In 1890 postage due stamps were overprinted FEE as well, but these are extremely rare. The 1s and 5s values of the 1887 Fee set also exist further overprinted FREE for use as Free Fee stamps. In 1890 postage stamps with the same face values were overprinted FREE FEE at once and replaced the 1887 issue. Trinidad also issued a customs stamp to pay the duty on opium in the 1880s.

Trinidad revenues were also used in Tobago from 1896 to 1908.

== Trinidad and Tobago ==
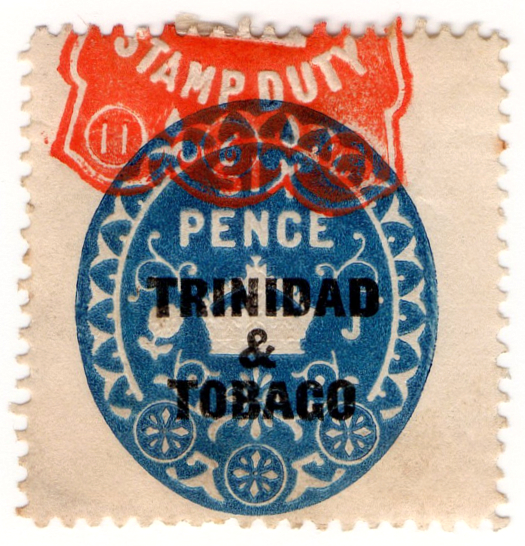
An embossed revenue stamp of Trinidad & Tobago.

=== Revenue ===
The first revenue issue for both islands was issued in 1908. It consisted of British embossed revenues overprinted TRINIDAD & TOBAGO in three lines. Similar issues continued to be issued until 1925, when new issues with the overprint in two lines were produced. In 1935 new designs in decimal currency were issued, this time not overprinted on British revenues but directly inscribed TRINIDAD AND TOBAGO. Later that year three stamps similar to postage issues but inscribed REVENUE were also issued. In 1964, some embossed revenues from the 1935 issue were overprinted with new values.

=== National Insurance ===
The first National Insurance stamps of Trinidad and Tobago were issued in the 1970s. These continued to be used until several new sets appeared in the 1980s with a new design. Most National Insurance stamps are only known as mint examples or with a Specimen perfin. Both of these originate from the printer's archive. Therefore, it is not known for certain which of the stamps, if any, were actually issued for use.

== See also ==
- Postage stamps and postal history of Trinidad and Tobago
