= Revenue stamps of Basel =

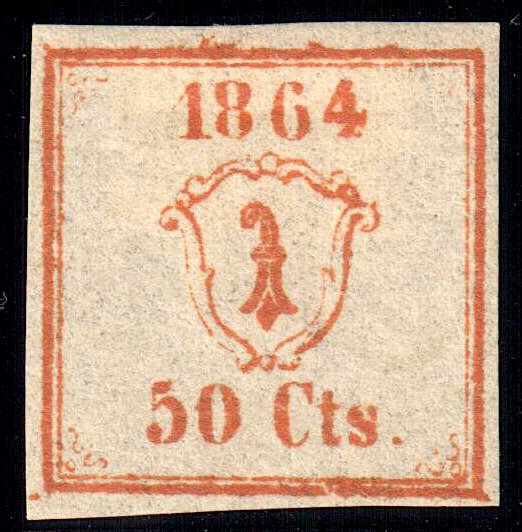
An 1864 unused Basel police revenue stamp

The Swiss canton and city of Basel issued revenue stamps. The Basel canton issued a total of 22 different stamps in 8 sets, for unemployment insurance and police tax. The city of Basel issued revenue stamps from 1860 to 1975. There were various types for different taxes. Taxes in Switzerland are levied by the Swiss Confederation, the cantons and the municipalities.

== Basel-Country ==
=== Unemployment insurance (1933) ===
- Swiss: Arbeitslosen-Versicherung
- Design: Basel arms.
- Total different stamps: 7.
- Sets: 1.

=== Police tax (1952- ) ===
- Swiss: Polizei
- Design: Basel arms.
- Total different stamps: 15.
- Sets: 7.

== Basel-City ==
=== Police tax (1860-) ===
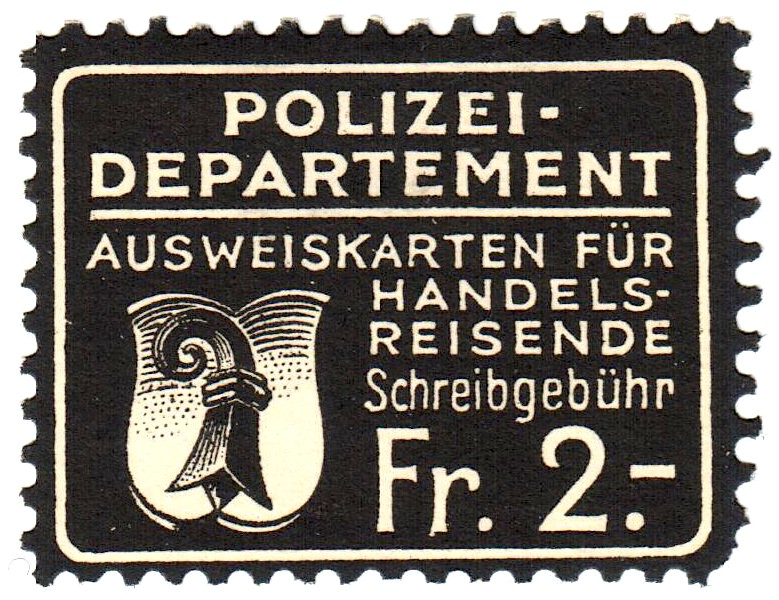
1931 police revenue

- Swiss: Polizei
- Design: Basel arms.
- Total different stamps: 128.
- Sets: 16.

=== Bill of exchange (1870-1883) ===
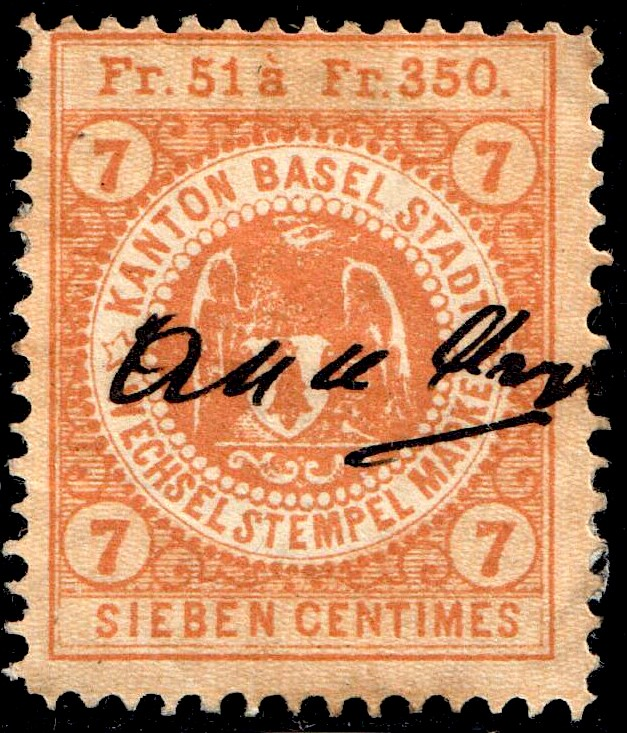
1870 bill of exchange revenue

The first bill of exchange stamp was issued probably before 1870, although it is unknown if this stamp was provisional or not. The amount of tax depended on the value of the bill. Strict regulations applied to how the stamp was to be cancelled.

- Swiss: Wechselstempel
- Design: Basel arms and basilisk
- Total different stamps: 25 (including the provisional).
- Sets: 3.

=== Bordereau tax (1884-1916) ===
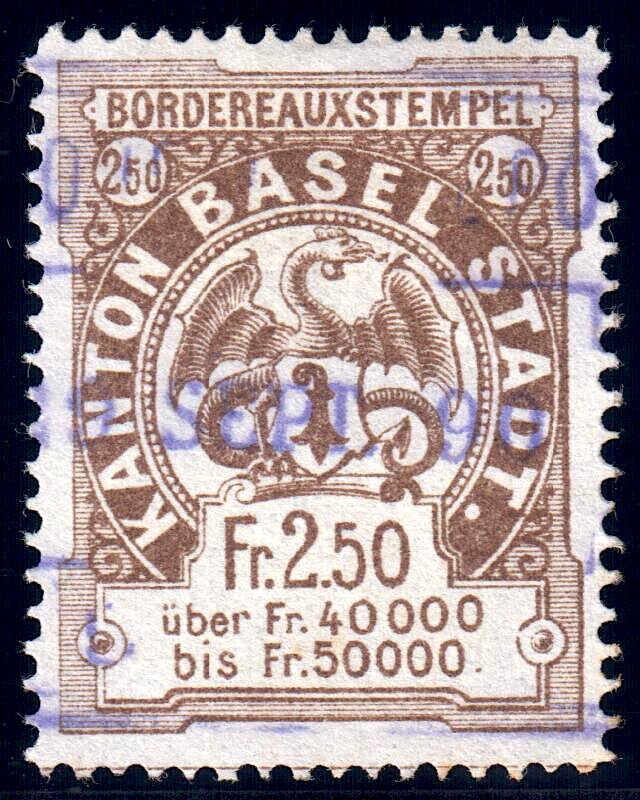
1884 bordereau revenue

Employers had to file a pay-roll report in the form of an individual periodical reporting leaflet (feuillet de cotisations) for each insured wage earner employed, plus a summary sheet (bordereau) for the entire group. The bordereau lists the name, registration number, and total contribution amount of each worker employed by the employer. Tax stamps were affixed on the bordereau as proof of the payment of social insurance contributions.

- Swiss: Bordereauxstempel
- Design: 1884 set the Basel arms and basilisk, later sets only the arms.
- Total different stamps: 19.
- Sets: 3.

=== General revenue (1884-1914) ===
- Swiss: Stempelmarke
- Design: 1884 set the Basel arms and basilisk, later sets only the arms.
- Total different stamps: 53.
- Sets: 4.

=== Stocks and bonds (ca. 1883) ===
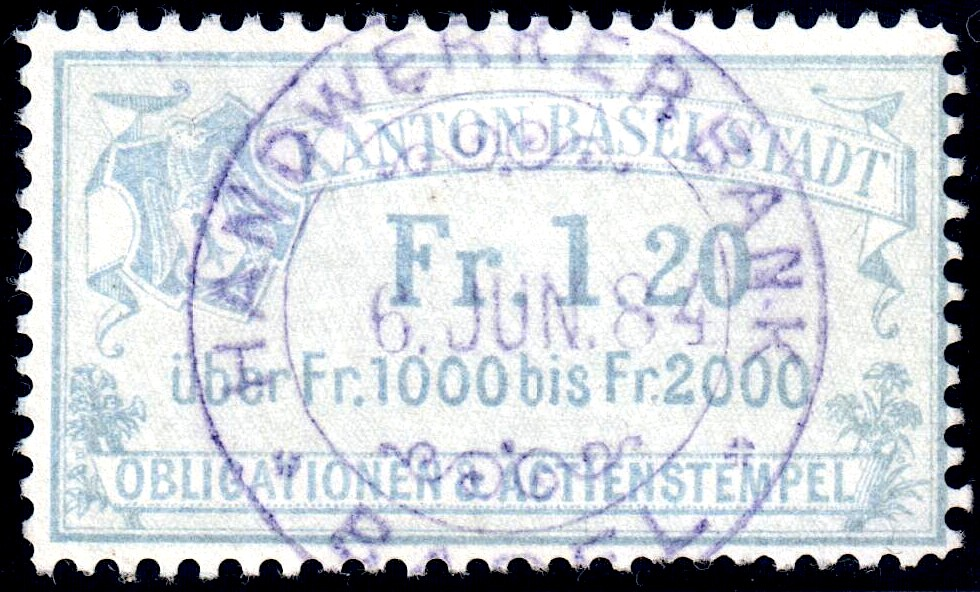
1883 stocks and bonds revenue

- Swiss: Obligationen & Actienstempel
- Design: Basel arms and basilisk.
- Total different stamps: 11.
- Sets: 2.

=== Bailiff office (1897-1944) ===
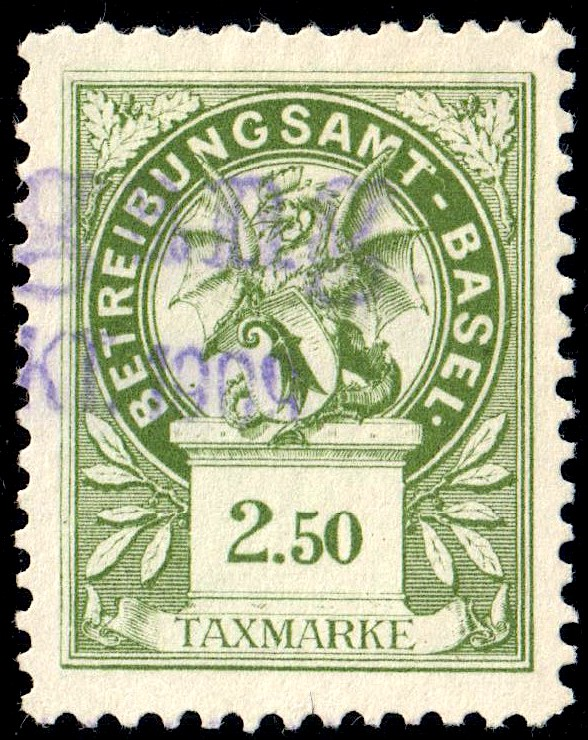
1905 bailiff revenue

The Swiss bailiff or debt collecting office (Betreibungsamt) is a cantonal or communal public and independent office which is responsible for the appropriate legal procedures for initiation of proceedings.

- Swiss: Betreibungsamt
- Design: Basel arms and basilisk, numerals. Surcharges.
- Total different stamps: 104.
- Sets: 6.

=== Frontier police (1917-1940s) ===
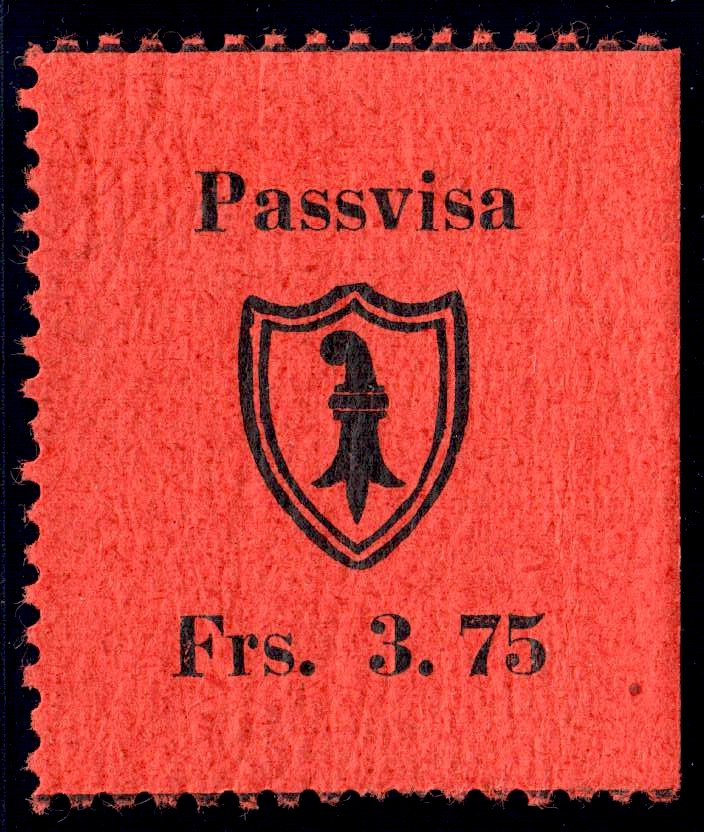
1918 frontier police revenue

- Swiss: Grenze
- Design: Basel arms.
- Total different stamps: 29.
- Sets: 7.

=== Registry office (1911-1958) ===
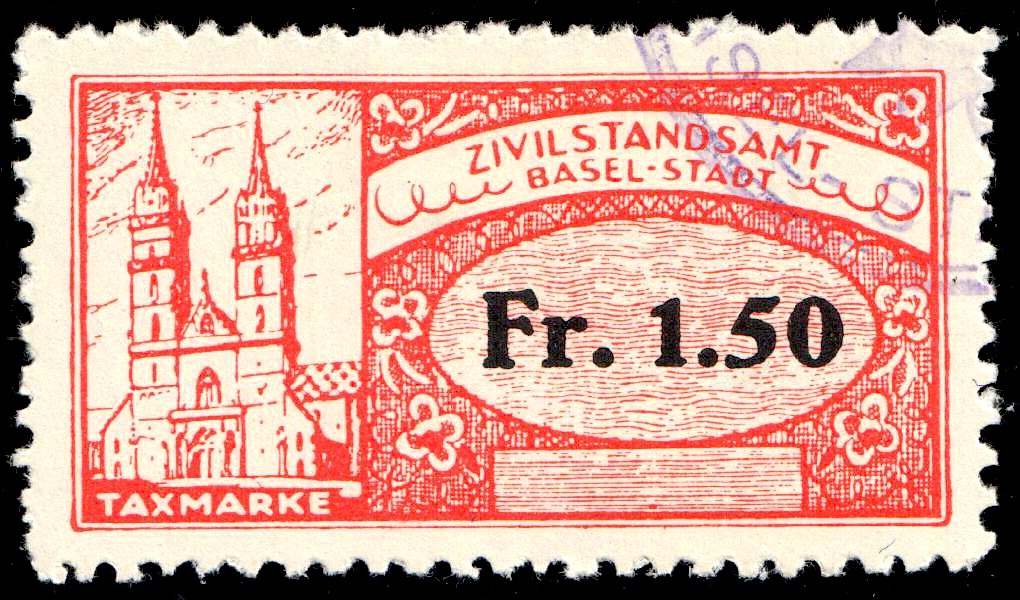
1911 registry office revenue

- Swiss: Zivilstandamt
- Design: 1911 Basel Ministry, later Basel arms.
- Total different stamps: 30.
- Sets: 3.

=== Student accident insurance (1922-1956) ===
- Swiss: Schüler Unfallversicherung
- Design: Horse and student, later Basel arms.
- Total different stamps: 62.
- Sets: 4.

=== Harbour due (1934-1940s) ===
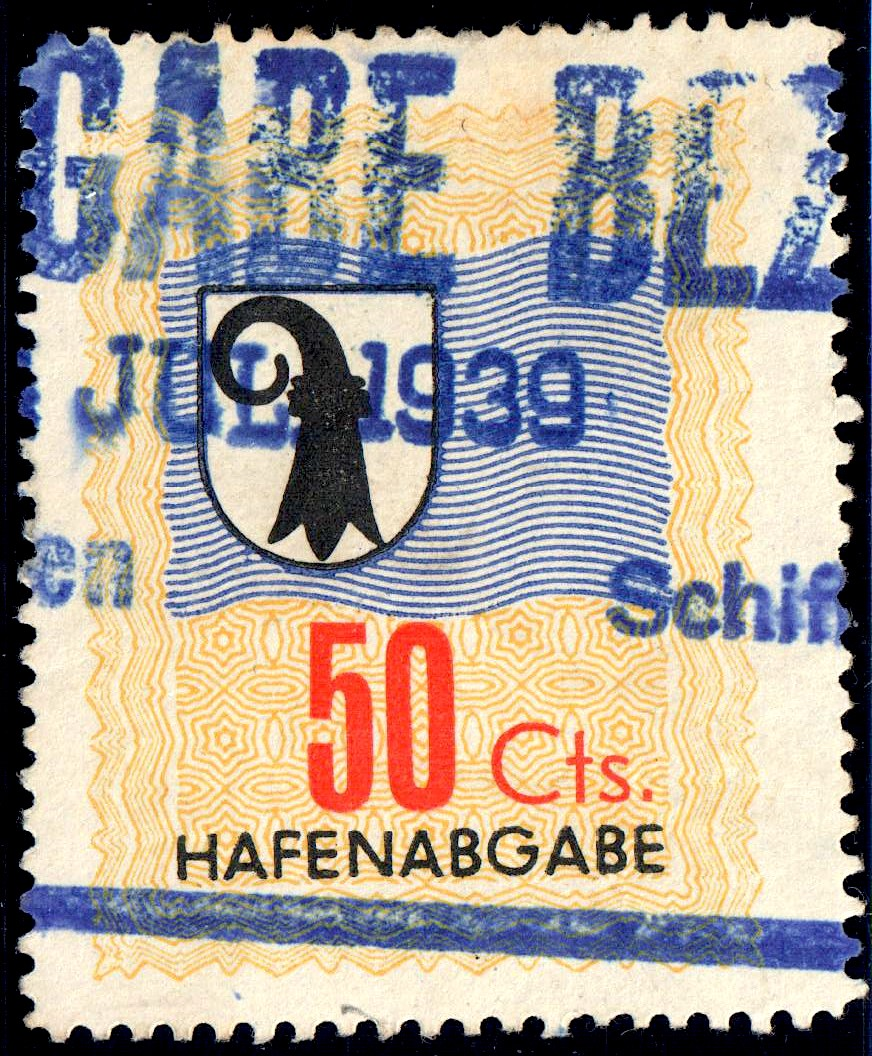
1934 harbour due

From 1934 to the 1940s the Rhine Navigation Office ('Rheinschiffahrtsamt') used 21 different stamps (3 sets) to collect Rhine harbour dues. The exact issue date of series 2 and 3 is unknown.

- Swiss: Hafenabgabe
- Design: Basel arms.
- Total different stamps: 21.
- Sets: 3.

=== Employment tax (1922-1956) ===
- Swiss: Arbeidsrappen
- Design: Basel arms.
- Total different stamps: 62.
- Sets: 4.

=== Public health service (1937-1942) ===
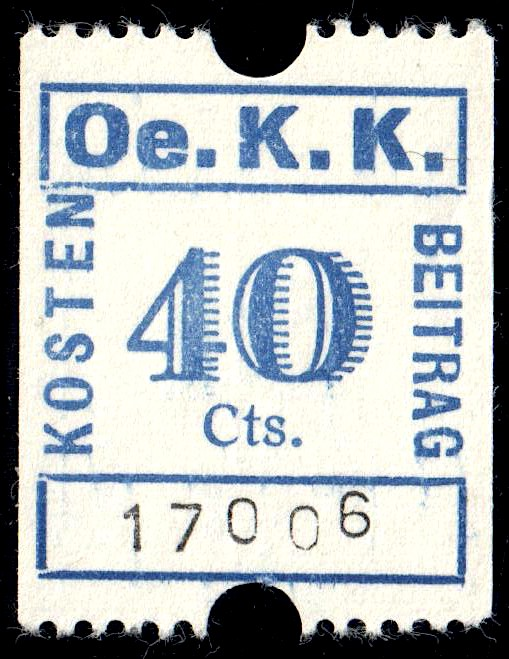
1938 public health service stamp

- Swiss: Öffentliche Krankenkasse
- Design: Basel arms.
- Total different stamps: 16.
- Sets: 4.

=== War tax (1941) ===
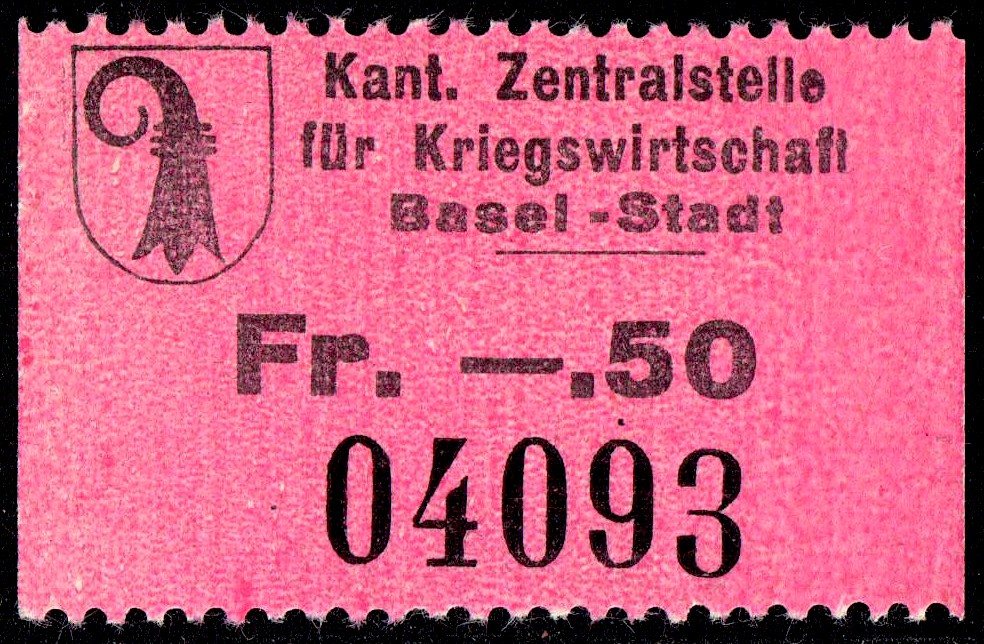
1941 0.50Fr. war tax

- Swiss: Zentralstelle für Kriegswirtschaft
- Design: Basel arms.
- Total different stamps: 10.
- Sets: 3.

=== Land registry (1948) ===
- Swiss: Eintrageamt (Grundbuchamt)
- Design: Basel arms.
- Total different stamps: 3.
- Sets: 1.

=== Chamber of commerce (1951) ===
- Swiss: Eintrageamt (Handelsregister)
- Design: Basel arms.
- Total different stamps: 5.
- Sets: 1.

=== Bicycle control (1944-1975) ===
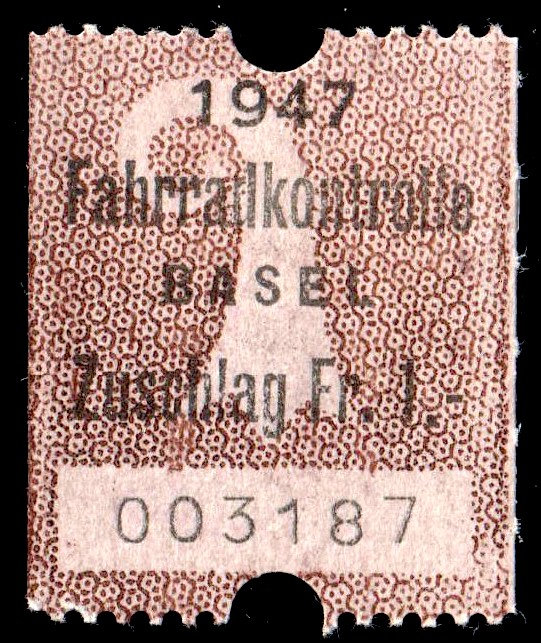
1947 bicycle tax

- Swiss: Fahrradkontrolle
- Design: Basel arms. Stamps with talon.
- Total different stamps: 36.
- Sets: 1.

=== Tourism (1942-1956) ===
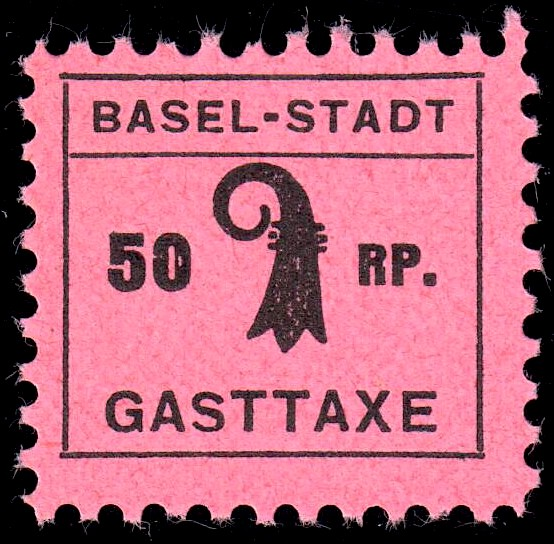
50Rp tourism tax

The tourism tax stamps of Switzerland deal with the stamps related to the short-term, visitor-accommodation tourism taxes (taxe de séjour). The tourism tax is a public contribution that the guest of a resort or region must pay to help finance the expenses for improving the conditions of their stay.

- Swiss: Gasttaxe
- Design: Basel arms.
- Total different stamps: 5.
- Sets: 1.

== See also ==
- Postage stamps and postal history of Switzerland
- Revenue stamp
- Revenue stamps of Basel on Wikimedia
