= Revenue stamps of Queensland =

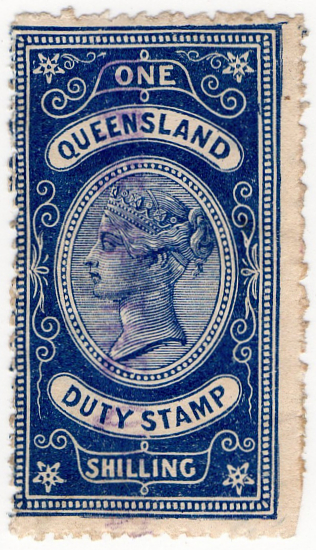
A one shilling revenue stamp of Queensland

The Australian state of Queensland issued revenue stamps from 1866 to 1988. There were various types for different taxes.

== Adhesive Duty (1918-c.1979) ==
These stamps replaced stamp duty ones. The first adhesive duty stamps were issued in 1918 with the portrait of King George V. In 1939 this design was replaced by a numeral type which was reused in 1966 with decimal values ranging from 1c to $200. Reprints and additional values continued until c.1979.

== Beer Duty (1885-c.1914) ==
There were several types of beer stamps for beer in kegs or bottles. Many different types were issued from 1885 until they were replaced by Australian beer duty stamps in 1918.

== Buffalo Fly Control (1941-1966) ==
Buffalo Fly Control stamps were first issued in 1941, with eleven values ranging from 1d up to £5. The same design was reused in 1966 for the decimal set which had ten values from 1c to $10.

== Commissioner's Adjudication (1895) ==
Only one Commissioner's Adjudication stamp was issued, and it was used when there was dispute over the duty paid on a legal document.

== Development Tax (1938-1941) ==
The first set of development tax stamps was issued in 1938, and additional values continued to be issued until 1941. Later that year these stamps were replaced by Tax Instalment ones.

== Impressed Duty (1895-1966) ==
The first set was a huge set with over sixty values ranging from 3d to £500. In 1901 a new set was issued portraying King Edward VII and in 1920 with the portrait of King George V. In 1930 these were replaced by numeral types which were reissued in 1966 in decimal currency, with values from 1c to $1000.

== Levy issues (1936-1961) ==
Various levy stamps were issued in Queensland until the levy system was discontinued in 1961. All were in the same design and either perforated or rouletted, and were identical apart from the inscription. There were the following types:

- Avocado Levy
- Banana Levy
- Bean Levy
- Citrus Levy
- Papaw Advertising Levy
- Pineapple Levy
- Tomato Levy
- Vegetable Levy

== National Parks (1988) ==
Four stamps with values ranging from 50c to $7 were issued in 1988, for camping fees payable to the Queensland National Parks and Wildlife Services.

== Producers Association (1924) ==
These were used to cover insurance in case of disease or pest infestation. Only one set was issued, with ten values ranging from halfpenny to £20. The pound values are very rare.

== Stamp Duty (1866-1918) ==
The first set for this tax was issued in 1866 with the portrait of Queen Victoria. Until 1901, all stamp duty revenues portrayed the Queen, although a multitude of designs and sizes were used. In 1901 a set portraying King Edward VII was issued, and this was replaced by adhesive duty stamps in 1918.

== Swine Sales (1962-c.1970) ==
The first swine sales set was issued in 1962 with ten values ranging from 1d to £5. The design was reused in 1966 for the decimal set with values from 1c to $10. They were withdrawn at around 1970.

== Tax Instalment (1941) ==
Only one set of tax instalment stamps was issued, in 1941. It was the keytype used in all Australian states, overprinted QLD. below the value. Twenty nine values ranging from 1d to £5 were issued, and are most commonly found in mint condition.

== Unemployment Insurance (1923-1945) ==
The first unemployment insurance stamps of Queensland were undated numeral types. In 1930 and 1931 some of the earlier issues were overprinted with the year of use, and from later that year to 1945 similar designs were issued but with the year incorporated within the design.

== Unemployment Relief Tax (1930-1939) ==
All unemployment relief tax stamps were in similar designs. The first issue of 1930 consisted on eleven values from 1d to £1. All later issues were in the same design but with the date of issue incorporated in the stamp.

== See also ==
- Postage stamps and postal history of Queensland
- Revenue stamps of Australia
