= Revenue stamps of Jersey =

Revenue stamps of Jersey refer to the various adhesive revenue or fiscal stamps issued by the States of Jersey for use on the island of Jersey, a British Crown dependency. The island has issued general-duty revenues, along with issues for Justice, Property Guarantee Fund and Social Assurance.

Jersey revenues are still in use.

== See also ==
- Postage stamps and postal history of Jersey
- Revenue stamps of Guernsey
- Revenue stamps of the Isle of Man
- Revenue stamps of the United Kingdom
