= Revenue stamps of Bermuda =

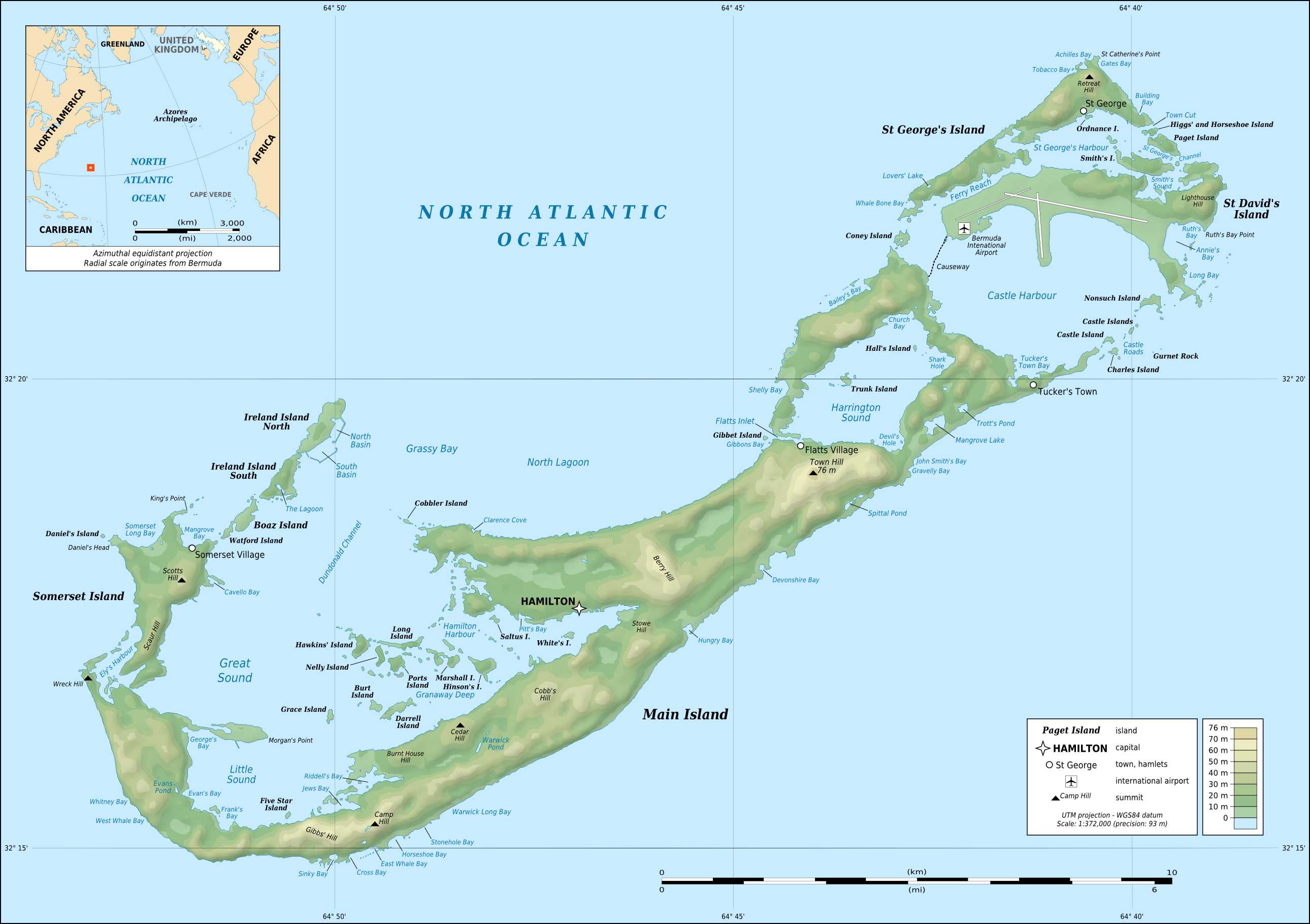
Map of Bermuda

The British territory of Bermuda issued revenue stamps from 1936 to 1984.

== Revenue ==
Until 1936, dual purpose postage and revenue stamps were used for fiscal purposes. In fact the 2s to £1 values from the definitive sets of 1918–1932, while also valid for postal use, were mainly intended for fiscal purposes only. In 1936, a King George V keytype inscribed REVENUE - REVENUE was issued with the face value of 12s 6d. This was used for the collection of passport and visa fees. In the reign of George VI postage stamps were once more used as revenues but a new issue portraying Queen Elizabeth II and the coat of arms of Bermuda was issued in 1954. This was reprinted in decimal currency in 1970, and a new series with a hogpenny coin design was issued in 1984 with values from $1 to $100.

== Contributory Pensions Insurance ==
A set of seven values from $1.30 to $10 was issued in 1980 for Contributory Pensions Insurance. The $1.30 and $5 were surcharged in around 1984 with the new values of $1.10 and $8 respectively.

== See also ==
- Postage stamps and postal history of Bermuda
