= Revenue stamps of South Australia =

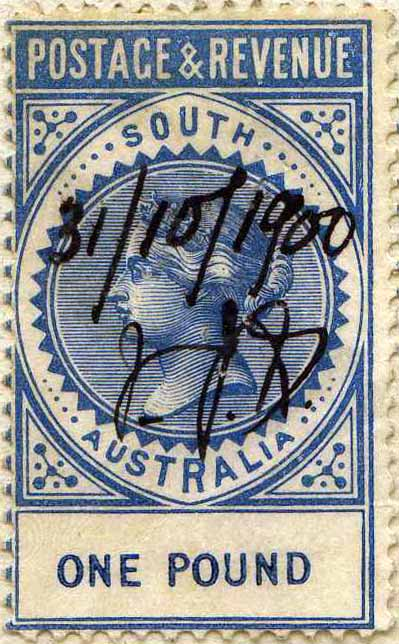
A fiscally used South Australian postage and revenue stamp

The Australian state of South Australia issued revenue stamps from 1894 to 2003. There were various types for different taxes.

== Bailiff Fee (1982-2002) ==
South Australia's first Bailiff Fee stamps were issued in 1982 and the designs were similar to earlier stamp duty revenues but with new inscriptions. Stamps in the same design but with differences in perforation or colour were issued until 1990, and they were used until about 2002.

== Beer Duty (1894-1918) ==
The first beer duty stamps were issued for beer in kegs in 1894, and like issues for the other Australian states, most were damaged or destroyed in use so most existing examples are in mint condition. The second issue was in 1903, and stamps in similar designs for use on kegs or bottles were issued until 1918. Later that year they were replaced by Australian Commonwealth beer duty issues.

== Cattle Duty (1940-1994) ==
These were used for compensation in case of slaughter for reasons of infection, and the first set was issued in 1940. A second set was issued in 1966 in decimal currency and these remained in use until 1994.

== Court Fee (1982-2002) ==
South Australia's first Court Fee stamps were issued in 1982 and the designs were similar to earlier stamp duty revenues but with new inscriptions. Stamps in the same design but with differences in perforation or colour were issued until 1990, and they were used until about 2002.

== Income Tax (1936-c.1937) ==
The first design was issued in 1936 and the set consisted of nine values ranging from 1s to £1. This was overprinted STAMP a year later to comply with the exact wording of the law, and a new set with corrected inscriptions was issued later.

== Jetty Tolls (1915-1954) ==
These were used as receipts by the South Australia Harbours Board for wharfage fees on fish landed. The first issue was a numeral design and reprints continued until 1931 with changes in perforation. They were used until 1954.

== Stamp Duty (1902-2003) ==
The first stamp duty revenues were issued in 1902 with the portrait of King Edward VII and they replaced fiscally used postage stamps. This design continued to be used until it was replaced by a numeral type in 1916. This design remained in use and a set in decimal currency was issued between 1966 and 1976. In 1977 a new set with the symbol of the state, a magpie, was issued, and stamps in this and a similar design were issued until 2003.

== Swine Duty (1937-c.1985) ==
These were used for compensation in case pigs had to be destroyed for reasons of infection, and the first set was issued in 1937. A second set was issued in 1966 in decimal currency and reprints of this set continued to be issued until around 1985.

== Tax Instalment (1941) ==
Only one set of tax instalment stamps was issued, in 1941. It was the keytype used in all Australian states, overprinted S.A. below the value. Twenty nine values ranging from 1d to £5 were issued, and are most commonly found in mint condition.

== See also ==
- Postage stamps and postal history of South Australia
- Revenue stamps of Australia
