= Emil Tamsen =

South African philatelist (1862–1957)

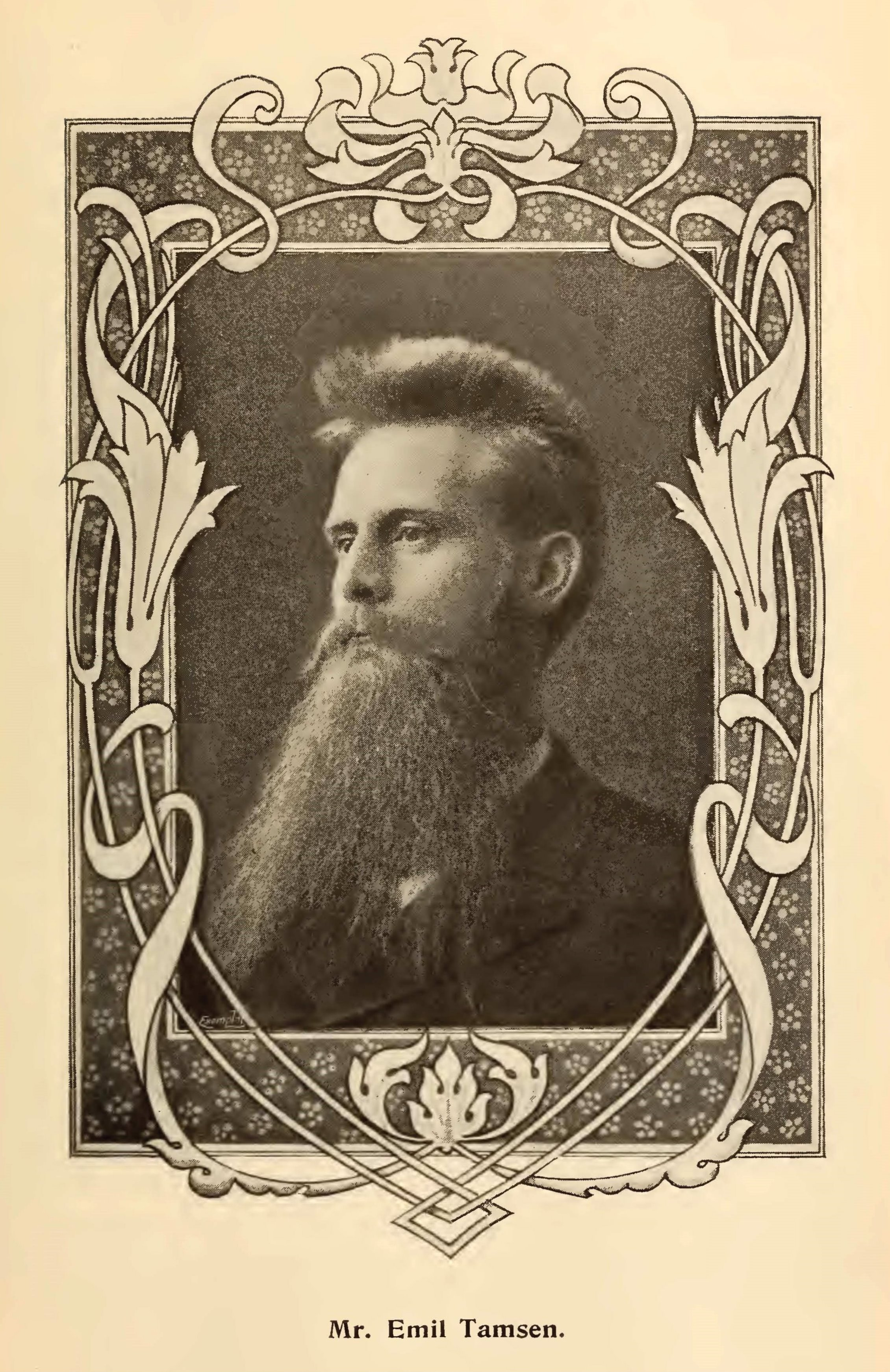
Emil Tamsen, 1861–1957

Emil Carl Christiaan Tamsen (2 January 1862 – 30 July 1957) was a South African philatelist, who was entered on the Roll of Distinguished Philatelists in 1921. He was also a signatory, in 1932, to the Roll of Distinguished Philatelists of Southern Africa. Tamsen was an expert in the stamps of Transvaal, about which he researched and wrote, and he was one of the founders in 1894 of the Johannesburg Philatelic Society.

== Early life ==
Tamsen was born in Naby, Schleswig-Holstein, Kingdom of Denmark, on 2 January 1862, at that time part of Denmark. He was the son of Franz August Tamsen and Friedericke Schuffman.

He emigrated to South Africa as a teenager and during the First Boer War (1880–81), he fought for the British and was part of the garrison that held Pretoria. He was discharged in 1883, and moved to the Waterberg area of the Northern Transvaal. On arrival, he found there were only 25 families in the area and only two houses at Nylstroom where he settled. He became a naturalised citizen of the South African Republic (the Transvaal Republic or ZAR).

== Stamp dealing and collecting ==
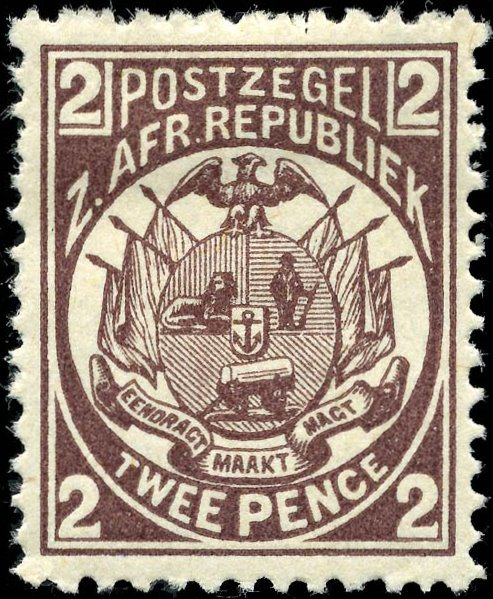
An 1885 stamp of Transvaal.

Tamsen was a friend of the Boer leader Paul Kruger, and he farmed and traded, but his main interests lay in stamp dealing and collecting where he was able to exploit the international interest in the stamps of Southern Africa in the 1880s and 90s. Stamps were issued in the period by British Bechuanaland and Protectorate, British Central Africa, the British South Africa Company, Cape of Good Hope, Natal, Orange Free State, Swaziland, Transvaal, and Zululand.

Despite the vast area covered, Tamsen was ideally positioned, either personally or through agents, to obtain information about new stamps. These included many surcharged and provisional issues and Tamsen obtained them either mint or by having them posted to him on cover. He was friends with Friederich Jeppe, the first Postmaster General of the Transvaal who also introduced adhesive stamps there, and Isaac van Alphen, Postmaster General during the Second Republic. He bought the contents of the dead letter office and "in ransacking the contents he added treasure after treasure to his collection".

== Auctions ==
The success of Tamsen's activities may be gauged by the fact that he sold over £7000 worth of stamps in London between 1899 and 1905, which represented only part of his collection and stock, a figure that would equate in 2014 terms to around £6-700,000. He did this while living in a remote area of the veldt and during a time which included the Second Boer War (1899–1902).

The war may have helped stimulate interest in Transvaal stamps. The first Tamsen auction sale was by Ventom, Bull and Cooper of Old Jewry, London, on 26 October 1899. The Philatelic Record and Stamp News reported that competition was brisk and: "The war has made sales of South Africans, particularly Transvaals and Orange Free States, very lively, one dealer in the Strand has been completely cleared out of current Transvaals." The second Tamsen sale was through the same auctioneers 9–10 January 1900 and included fine Cape triangulars. His Bechuanaland was sold on 10 May 1900 through the same firm.

== Writing ==
Tamsen was a regular writer for Stanley Gibbons Monthly Journal and its successor Gibbons Stamp Weekly, both predecessors of the current Gibbons Stamp Monthly. He wrote of the latest stamp finds in the Transvaal and elsewhere in Southern Africa, and gave reports on the health, or otherwise, of philatelic societies in the region. In November 1904 he wrote from Nylstroom that it was not easy to report on current philatelic events when the nearest collector lived 100 miles away.

== Publications ==
- From cover to cover. Privately produced and circulated, 1940. (With Park Smith)

== Personal life ==
Tamsen married Clara Pauline Richter (1866–1963) and they had a son, Adolph Carl Tamsen (1892–1961). He was a freemason. Tamsen died on 30 July 1957 in Pretoria.
