= Revenue stamps of the Cape of Good Hope =

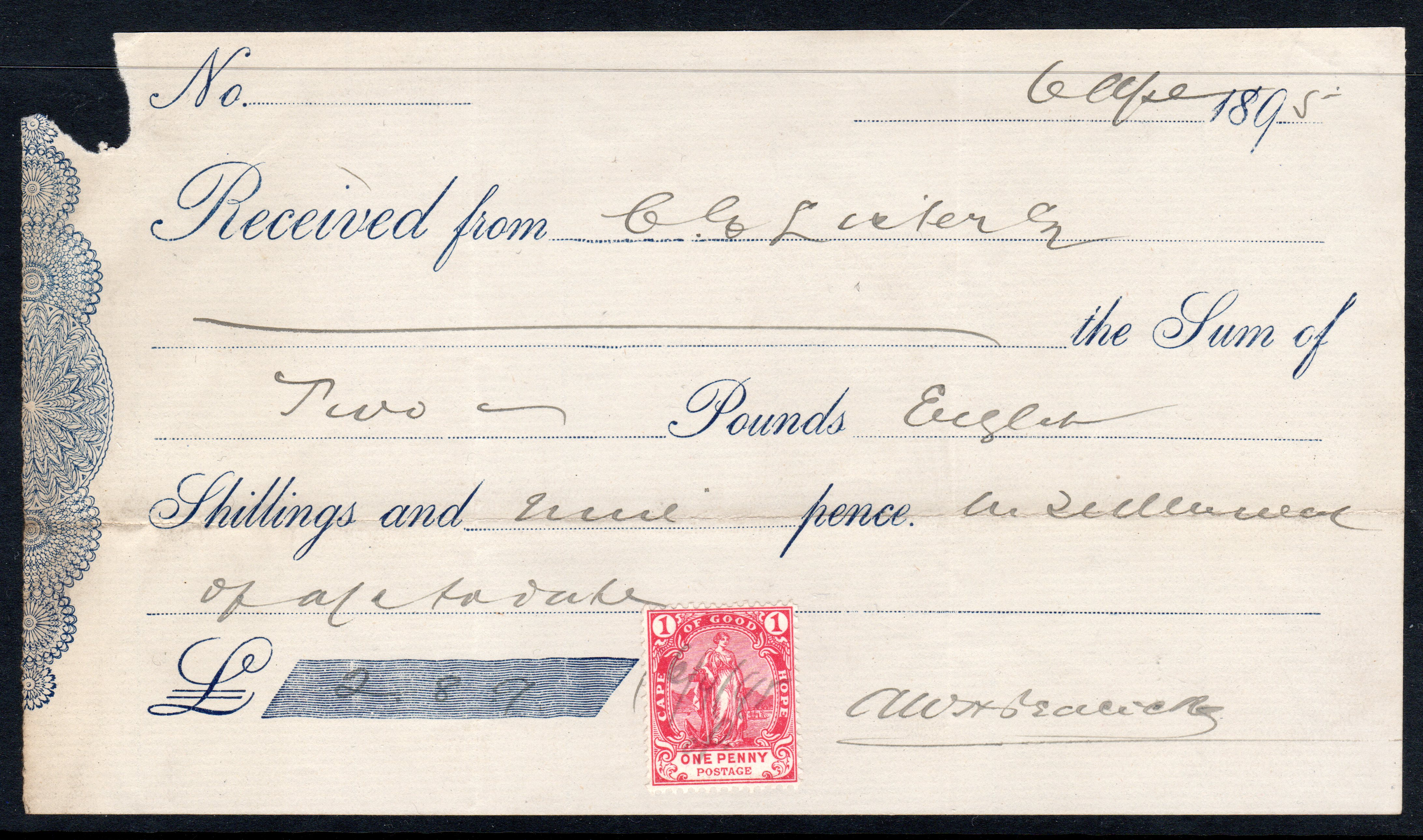
A Cape of Good Hope postage stamp fiscally used on an 1895 receipt

Cape Colony issued revenue stamps from 1864 to 1961. There were a number of different stamps for several taxes.

== Cape Colony ==
The Cape Colony's first revenues were issued in 1864. The issue consisted of eleven values ranging from ½d to £10. All stamps were imperforate and the main design was a crown. The halfpenny value was printed normally, while the other values were embossed in colour. This was replaced by an issue portraying Queen Victoria a year later. There are two types, either inscribed The Stamp Act of 1864 Cape of Good Hope or Government of Cape of Good Hope. There are several variations in perforation and watermark, as this issue remained in use for over thirty years until the end of the nineteenth century. Between 1870 and 1887, a smaller version of this design inscribed Cape of Good Hope Stamp Duty was also issued. In 1898 a new design portraying an allegorical figure of Hope was issued, with sixteen values ranging from 1d to £20. This remained in use until a new issue appeared in 1903 portraying King Edward VII, and this remained in use until being incorporated into the Union of South Africa in 1910.

In 1879, Queen Victoria revenues were overprinted INSURANCE in blue. These are rare and overprints are also known inverted. Various King Edward VII postage stamps were also overprinted for various types of revenue:

- Cigarette Duty (1909)
- Customs Duty (1902)
- Patent and Proprietary (1909)

Apart from these, a new design for Patent and Proprietary was issued between 1909 and 1910 for medicine duty before the Act was repealed in 1911.

When it was a colony, the Cape of Good Hope also issued a wide range of impressed duty stamps.

== Cape Province ==
In 1911, various high value colonial revenue issues were overprinted PENALTY to pay for the fee for late payment of duties. These were replaced by South African penalty stamps in 1913. In the 1940s, various designs featuring the South African coat of arms was issued to pay entertainments duty on theatre or film tickets. This was replaced by a numeral design around 1950. The numeral design was reissued in 1961 denominated in South African rand, and these are the last Cape revenues.

== Griqualand West ==
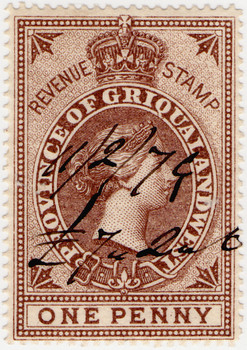
An 1879 Griqualand West revenue stamp

After Griqualand West was annexed by the British, the first revenue stamps that were issued were Cape revenues overprinted G, in a similar manner to its postage stamps. There are various types of the overprint, and many forgeries have been made, from as early as 1900. Therefore, the only way to verify if they are genuine is if the stamps have clear cancellations of towns in Griqualand, such as Kimberley.

The second series of revenue stamps was issued in 1879. This was printed in London, in a similar design to a series of Transvaal revenues which had been issued a year earlier. This series had eleven stamps with values ranging from 1d to £5. The high values are rare and are sought after by collectors. These were withdrawn a year later in 1880 when the province was annexed by the Cape Colony.

== Other overprints ==
Apart from the province of Griqualand West, Cape revenues were also overprinted for use in a number of other parts of Southern Africa. These were:

- Basutoland (1900–1913)
- Bechuanaland Protectorate (1903–1913)
- British Bechuanaland (1887)
- Swaziland (1904–1913)
- Transvaal (1902)

== See also ==
- Postage stamps and postal history of the Cape of Good Hope
- Postage stamps and postal history of Griqualand West
- Revenue stamps of South Africa
