= Postage stamps and postal history of Lesotho =

A 1976 stamp of Lesotho

This is a survey of the postage stamps and postal history of Lesotho, formerly known as Basutoland.

== First stamps (1933) ==
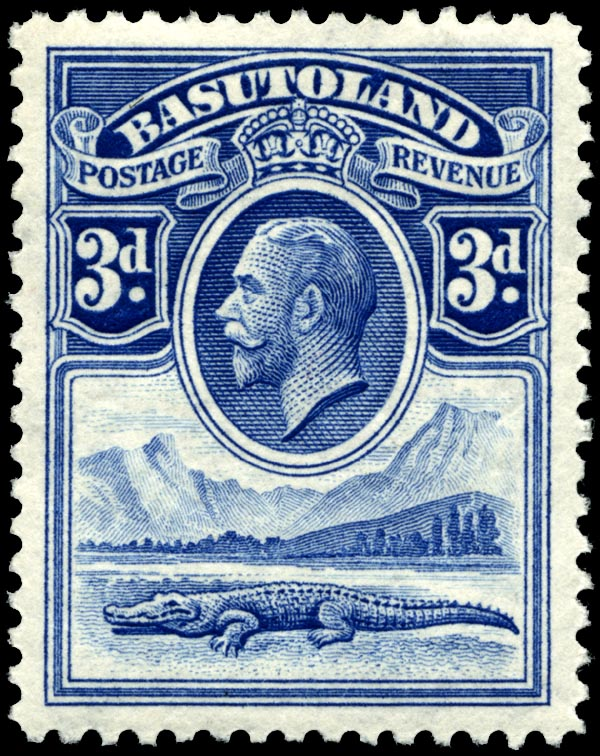
A 1933 stamp from the first issue of Basutoland.

Stamps of the Cape of Good Hope were used in Basutoland in 1880, then those of South Africa in 1910.

The first stamps of Basutoland were definitive stamps issued in 1933 and were a set of ten stamps all of the same design depicting King George V and the Nile Crocodile against a background of mountains.

== King George V and VI (1935–1949) ==
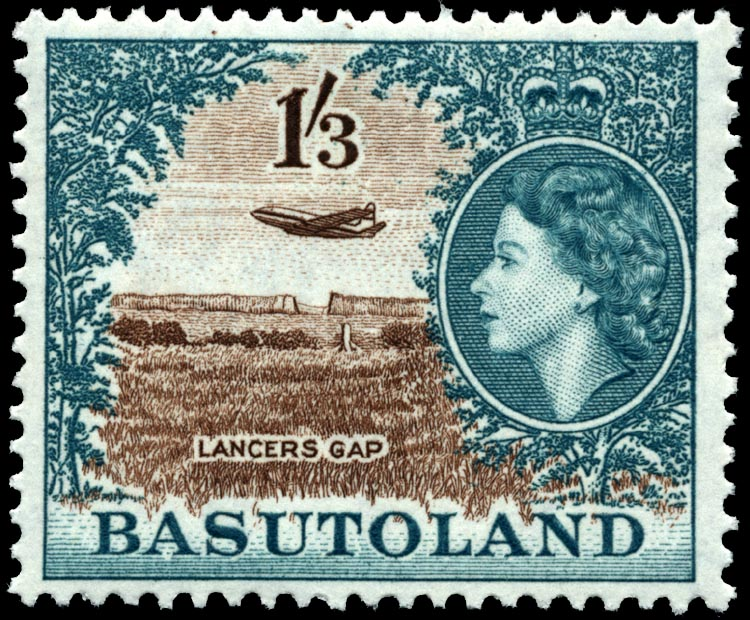
A 1954 stamp of Basutoland

Basutoland participated in the British Commonwealth 1935 Silver Jubilee omnibus issues and the 1937 Coronation omnibus. In 1938 a new definitive series was issued based entirely on the first series of King George V but with the head of George VI instead. This series had eleven stamps.

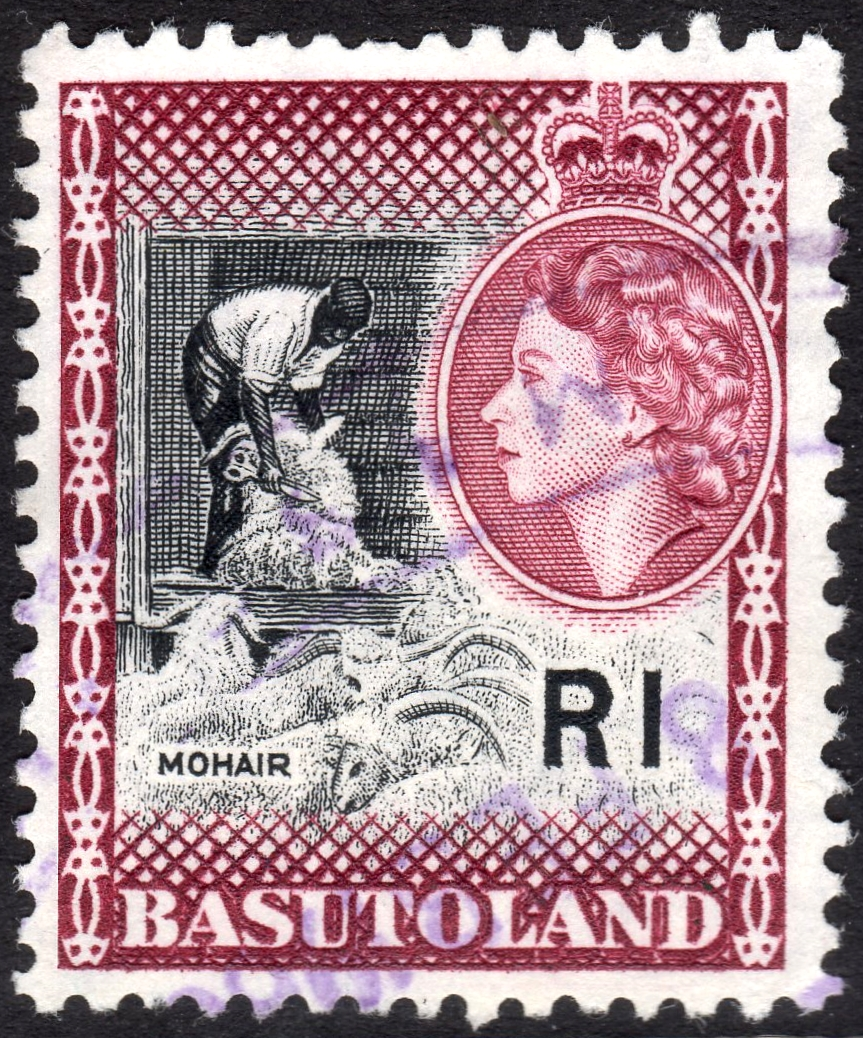
A 1963 stamp of Basutoland

In 1945, Victory stamps of South Africa were overprinted Basutoland.

== Queen Elizabeth (1953–1966) ==
The first stamp of the new reign was issued on 3 June 1953 and was part of the Coronation omnibus series issued throughout the British Commonwealth. A new definitive was issued on 18 October 1954. The 2d value was surcharged in 1959, and later that year a commemorative set was issued. In 1961 the whole set was surcharged with the new currency - South African rand. The 1954 set was reissued with the new currency inscribed from 1961 to 1963. After that, all the commemorative sets except for one (New Constitution) were omnibus issues. The New Constitution set was inscribed "LESOTHO BASUTOLAND" instead of just "BASUTOLAND".

== Independence (1966–present) ==
The first stamps of independent Lesotho were issued on 4 October 1966. On 1 November of that year, the 1961–1963 set of Basutoland was overprinted "LESOTHO". In 1979, the currency was changed from South African rand to lisente (s) and maloti (m). In 1980–1981 the then current 1976–1978 definitives were overprinted with the new currency, and this created a wide range of errors (such as surcharge double, albino surcharges, inverted surcharges, etc.) and stamps with second and third different surcharges.

== See also ==
- Postage stamps and postal history of the Cape of Good Hope
- Postage stamps and postal history of South Africa
- Revenue stamps of Basutoland and Lesotho
