= Revenue stamps of Transvaal =

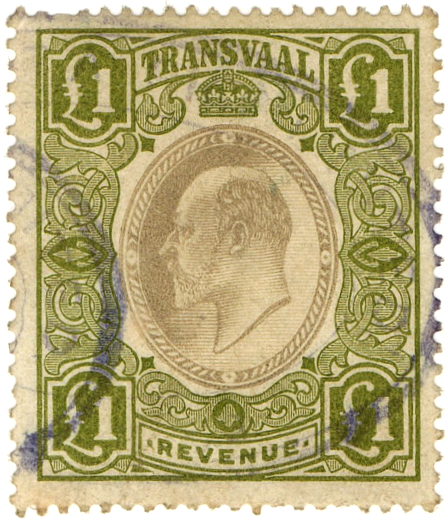
A 1902 Transvaal revenue stamp

The South African Republic (ZAR), later known as Transvaal issued revenue stamps from 1875 to around 1950. There were a number of different stamps for several taxes.

== First Republic (1875–1877) ==
The first ZAR revenues were numeral stamps inscribed ZEGELREGT issued in 1875. A set of 9 with values from 6d to £5 was issued, and it is imperforate. In 1876 an embossed 1d value was issued for cheques.

== First British Occupation (1877–1884) ==
After the South African Republic came under British suzerainty in 1877, ZAR revenues were overprinted V.R. TRANSVAAL. These were replaced by an issue depicting Queen Victoria in 1878, and this was used until 1884.

== Second Republic (1886–1894) ==
The first issues of the second republic were similar to the 1875 issues but perforated. These were replaced by a numeral design in 1886, which remained in use until the Second Boer War. Between 1893 and 1894, various large stamps were issued to pay the Customs Frank Fee, which was a fee payable to the Customs Office for duty-free goods. These stamps are quite rare and are popular with collectors.

=== New Republic ===
New Republic was a short lived Boer republic which existed from 1884 to 1888, when it was absorbed into the ZAR. Postage stamps were used for fiscal purposes, but in 1886 a £15 value was issued in the same design as postage stamps but solely intended for fiscal use. Only three were printed, and one survives to this day. It is one of the greatest rarities of British Empire revenue philately.

== Second British Occupation (1900–1908) ==
In 1900, the numeral issues of 1886 were issued handstamped V.R.I. or additionally surcharged at Zeerust. A year later these were overprinted V.R.I., and in 1902 various Cape revenues were overprinted TRANSVAAL. Later that year a new design depicting King Edward VII was issued.

In 1901, ZAR postage stamps were overprinted E.R.I. PASS and a new value to pay for the fee for passports of native workers. A year later postage or revenue stamps featuring King Edward VII were overprinted PASS for the same purpose. In 1903 revenues were overprinted with a departmental control cachet REFUGEES AID DEPARTMENT COMPENSATION as well. Finally, in 1908 Transvaal postage stamps featuring King Edward VII were overprinted CUSTOMS DUTY to pay the tax on imported printed matter. There are two different types of the overprint and they were applied to values ranging 1d to 6d.

== Province of South Africa (1913-c.1950) ==
In 1913, colonial revenue issues were overprinted PENALTY to pay for the fee for late payment of duties. These were replaced by South African penalty stamps later that year. Around 1940, a design featuring the South African coat of arms was issued to pay entertainment tax on theatre on concert tickets. This was replaced by a numeral design around 1950. A Furniture Workers stamp was also issued around 1940.

== Foreign overprints ==
Transvaal revenues were also overprinted for use in Bechuanaland Protectorate (1904–1910) and Swaziland (1904–1913).

== See also ==
- Postage stamps and postal history of Transvaal
- Revenue stamps of South Africa
