= Revenue stamps of South Africa =

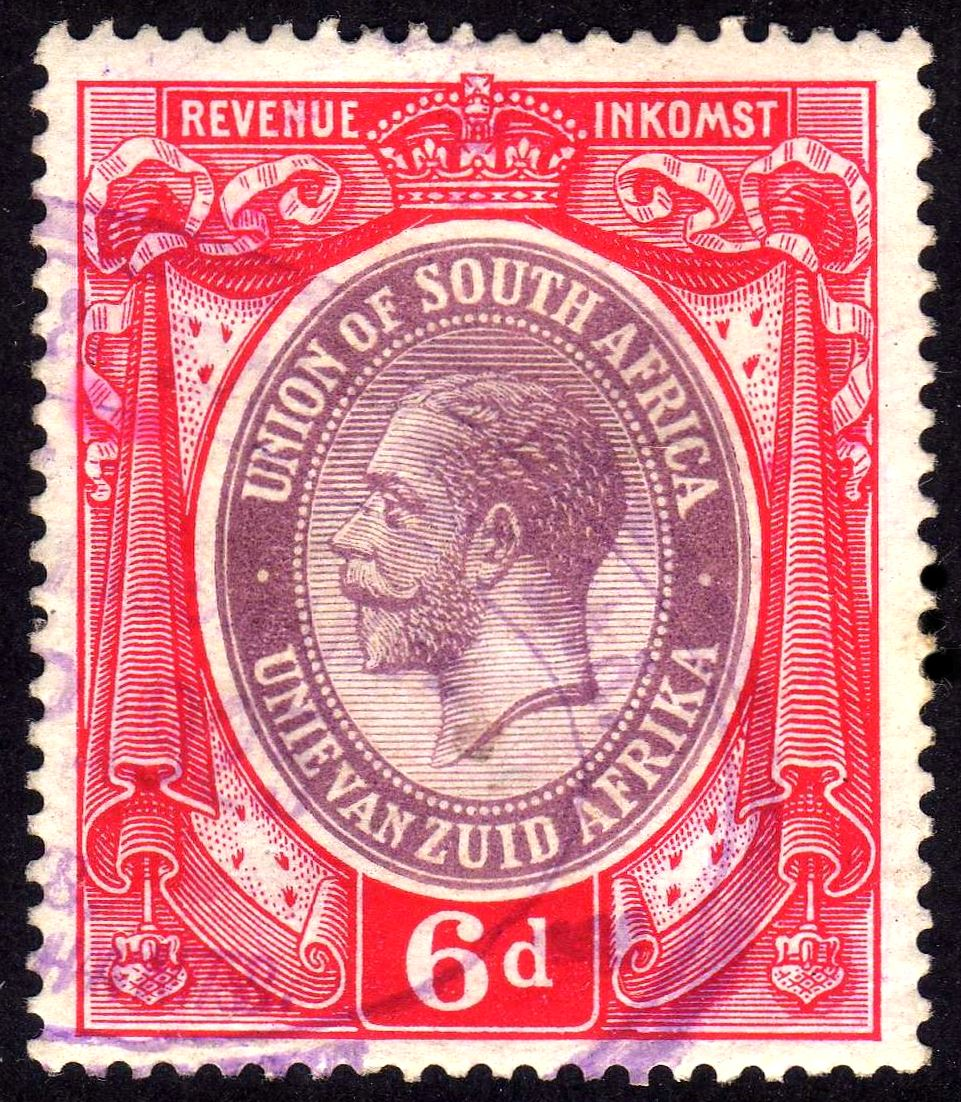
A 1913 South African revenue stamp

South Africa issued revenue stamps from 1910 to 2009. Apart from national issues various provinces of the country issued revenues from around 1855 to c. 1970.

== Pre-Union states and provincial issues ==
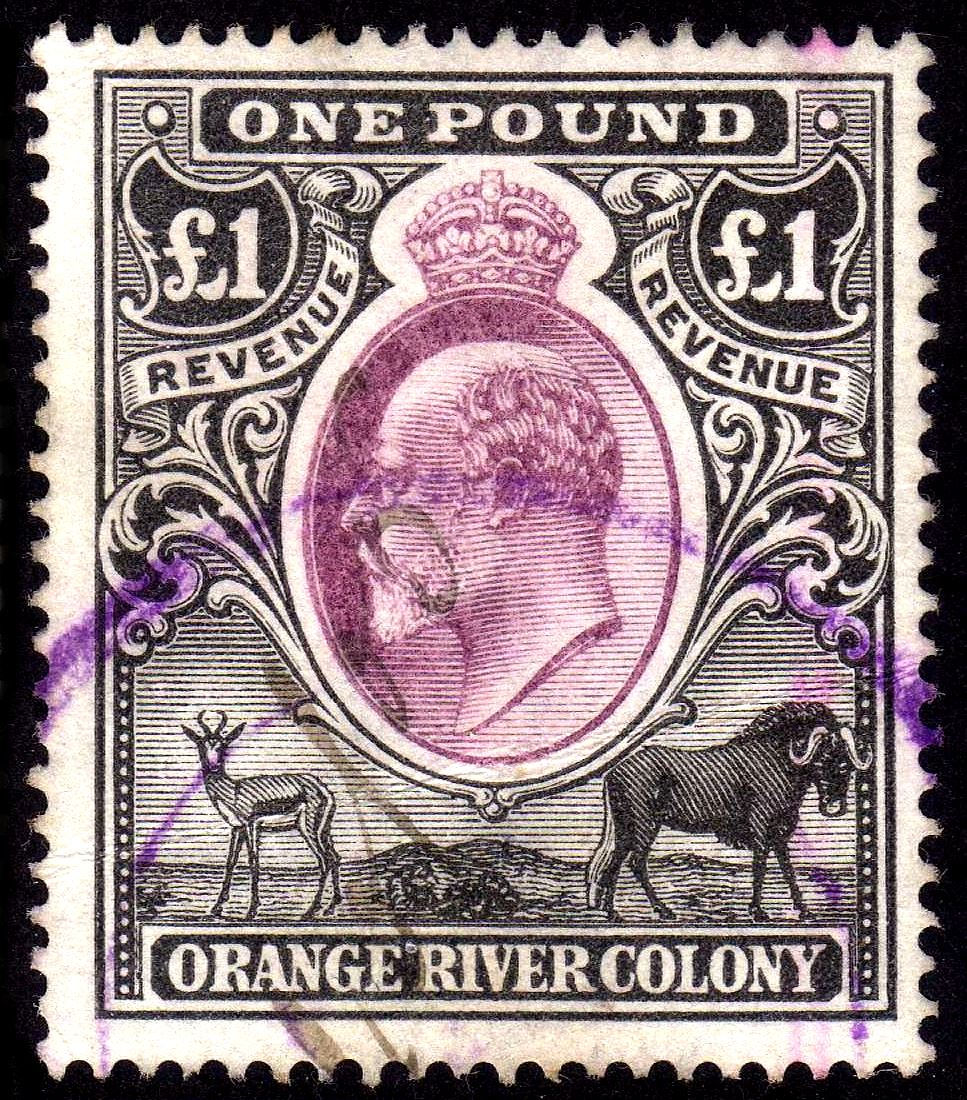
An Orange River Colony £1 revenue stamp issued in 1903

Before South Africa was united in 1910, each part of South African issued their own stamps. These were:

- British Bechuanaland (1886-1887)
- Cape of Good Hope (1864-1910)
- Griqualand West (1877-1879)
- Natal (c.1855-1910)
- New Republic (1886)
- Orange Free State (1856-1892)
- Orange River Colony (1900-c.1910)
- South African Republic (1875-1878 and 1886-1894)
- Stellaland (1884–1886)
- Transvaal (1876-1884 and 1900-1908)
- Zululand (1888–1892)

After unification, the following provinces had their own issues as well:

- Cape of Good Hope (1911-1961)
- Natal (c.1918-c.1965)
- Orange Free State (1912-c.1920)
- Transvaal (1913-c.1950)

The city of Durban also issued municipal revenues from 1957 to around 1970.

== National issues ==
The first general purpose South African revenue issue was in 1913. From that year until 1937, all South African revenues featured the profile of King George V, with changes in size and inscriptions. From 1938 to 1952 stamps featured King George VI. The original 1938 issue was reissued in bantam format in 1943, and in 1946 these were replaced by a new design still featuring the King. In 1942, Native Tax stamps were overprinted REVENUE or INKOMSTE. 1954 saw a new design featuring Queen Elizabeth II, but these were quickly replaced by an issue bearing the coat of arms later that year. These were used reissued denominated in rand in 1961, and were replaced by a numeral issue in 1968. These remained in use until a new design, also a numeral, appeared in 1978. These were finally withdrawn in March 2009.

=== Additional Stock Fee ===
These stamps were used to pay for the fee of more than 10 head of cattle allowed to be grazed on crown land. Only seven stamps were issued between 1913 and 1937. All of these were King George V revenue issues overprinted FEE FOR ADDITIONAL STOCK. There are a number of different types of this overprint.

=== Assize ===
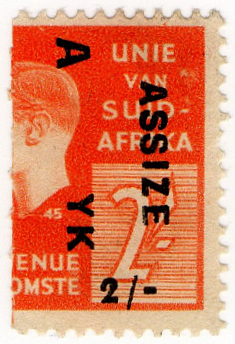
Assize Revenue stamp of 1945 - Value 2s

These were used to pay the annual fee for the inspection of weighing and measuring equipment such as shop scales. Many different stamps were issued between c.1920 and 1956, and all were revenue or postage stamps bisected in two (one half being for the receipt, the other for the audit duplicate), and overprinted ASSIZE (c.1920), ASSIZE IJK (c.1923-c.1930) or ASSIZE YK (c.1930-1956). All of these are very scarce or rare revenue stamps.

=== Cigarette Duty ===
Various cigarette excise stamps and labels were issued in South Africa between 1913 and the 1980s. There are dozens of different issues, and many are quite scarce although there are common ones as well.

=== Consular ===
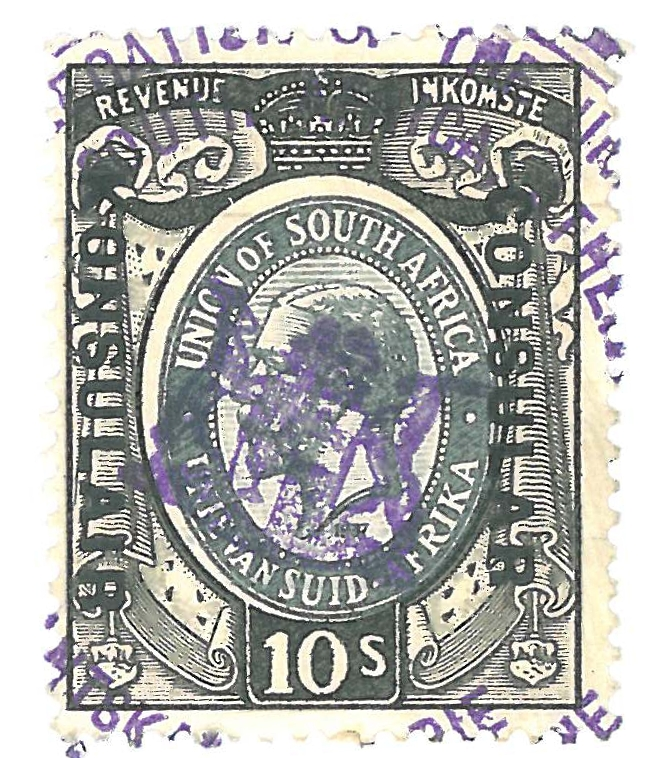
A Consular stamp from 1937

These stamps were used to pay the fee for visas of foreigners visiting South Africa. Since they were not used for local passports, they are rather elusive. All are revenue or postage stamps overprinted, and they were issued between 1913 and 1980. Until 1968 overprints read CONSULAR KONSULAIR, and from 1969 they read CONSULAR KONSULÊR.

=== Customs Duty ===
These were used to pay the tax on imported printed matter and were sold from South African consulates abroad. All are overprints on contemporary postage stamps, and there are a variety of different issues. The first issues were overprinted CUSTOMS DUTY from 1913 to 1918. Later stamps were overprinted DOUANE in French, and these were used from 1926 to 1954. Most Customs stamps are quite common, although some of the high values are scarcer.

=== Farm Dairy Levy ===
A two-part stamp featuring a dairy cow was issued around 1930.

=== Native Tax ===
Only one stamp was issued for this tax in 1942. It was used to pay the tax on native huts or households in order to encourage employment instead of farming or herding. The stamp saw rather limited use, and was later overprinted for use as regular revenue use. It was also overprinted for use in Basutoland and Bechuanaland.

=== Penalty ===
These stamps were used to pay the penalty fee for late payments of revenue. All are revenue stamps overprinted either by printing or by manuscript. The first 1913 issue consisted of King George V revenues overprinted either PENALTY. or BOETE., and from 1931 stamps were overprinted with these two words together. Manuscript overprints reading Penalty or PENALTY are known from 1920, 1931, 1937, 1938 and 1968. Similar manuscript overprints but in Afrikaans Boete are known from 1984 and 1985. These were withdrawn with the regular revenue issues in 2009.

== Bantustans ==
Each of the four independent Bantustans issued their own revenue stamps. Most are commonly found mint, but are scarce used.

=== Bophuthatswana ===
Bophuthatswana's only revenue stamps were issued around 1988. The set consisted of twelve stamps ranging from 2c to R100 bearing the coat of arms and inscribed in Tswana (LOTSENO), Afrikaans (INKOMSTE) and English (REVENUE).

=== Ciskei ===
Ciskei's only revenue stamps were issued in c.1988. The set consisted of ten stamps ranging from 3c to R100 bearing the coat of arms and inscribed in Xhosa (INGENISO) and English (REVENUE). Five values from 5c to R10 were also issued overprinted ISOHLWAYO/PENALTY in black or red, for use as penalty stamps.

=== Transkei ===
Transkei's only revenue stamps were issued around 1988. The set consisted of fourteen stamps ranging from 2c to R50 bearing the coat of arms superimposed on the national flag and inscribed in Xhosa (INGENISO) and English (REVENUE). Seven values from 5c to R10 were also issued overprinted ISOHLWAYO/PENALTY in red, for use as penalty stamps.

=== Venda ===
Venda's only revenue stamps were also issued in c.1988. The set consisted of seven stamps ranging from 5c to R50 bearing the coat of arms in a similar format to Transkei's issue and inscribed in Venda (MBULLO) and English (REVENUE). Six values from 5c to R10 were also issued overprinted NDATISO/PENALTY in red, for use as penalty stamps.

== Foreign overprints ==
South African revenues were overprinted for use in a number of other parts of southern Africa. These were:

- Basutoland (1913-1948)
- Bechuanaland Protectorate (1914-1942)
- South West Africa (1920-1933 and 1945-1961)
- Swaziland (1913-1931)

== See also ==
- Revenue stamps of Bechuanaland
- Revenue stamps of the Cape of Good Hope
- Revenue stamps of Transvaal
- Revenue stamps of Zululand
- Postage stamps and postal history of South Africa
