= Postage stamps and postal history of Eswatini =

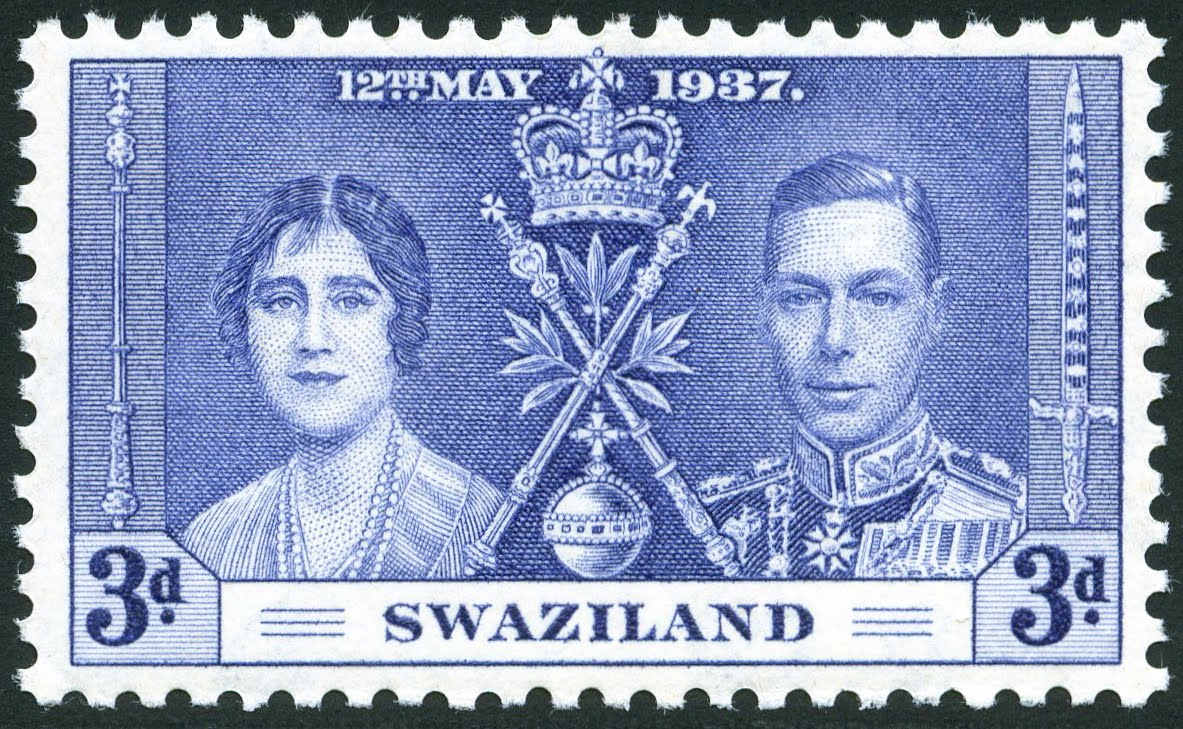
A 1937 stamp of Swaziland

This is a survey of the postage stamps and postal history of Eswatini, formerly Swaziland.

The first stamps of Swaziland were overprinted stamps of South African Republic (Transvaal) issued 18 October 1889. Swaziland became a protectorate of the South African Republic in 1894 and the stamps of the South African Republic were used.

In 1902, Swaziland became a British protectorate following the Second Boer War and the stamps of the Transvaal Colony were used. From 1910, the stamps of the Union of South Africa were used. Stamps were issued for Swaziland again in 1933.

In 1967, Swaziland issued stamps as a self-governing protected state. The kingdom gained independence in 1968. Since 2018, stamps are inscribed "Eswatini".

== See also ==
- Postage stamps and postal history of Transvaal
