= Revenue stamps of Zululand =

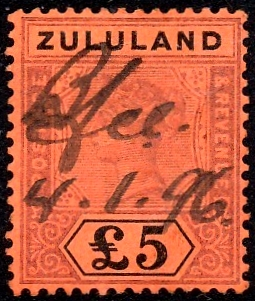
An 1894 stamp of Zululand used for revenue purposes in 1896.

The British colony of Zululand issued revenue stamps in 1888. The only set consisted of seven values of 1d, 1s, 5s, 9s, £1 (two different colours), £5 and £20 of Natal revenues overprinted ZULULAND in a similar overprint to that used for postage stamps. The 1d later became valid for postal use as well. All the higher values now command high prices and are quite rare. In addition to this issue, the same Natal £5 is known with a different overprint in violet, but it is not known if this was a legitimate issue or not.

Natal's high value revenues were replaced by the postage stamps with face values up to £5 which were issued in 1894. The higher values of this set were mainly intended for fiscal rather than postal use.

== See also ==
- Postage stamps and postal history of Zululand
- Revenue stamps of South Africa
