= Beek, Berg en Dal =

Beek
- Village
- Location in the province of Gelderland Beek (Netherlands)
- Coordinates: 51°49′45″N 5°55′33″E
- Country: Netherlands
- Province: Gelderland
- Municipality: Berg en Dal

Area
  - Total: 4.41 km^{2} (1.70 sq mi)
- Elevation: 13 m (43 ft)

Population (2021)
  - Total: 3,665
  - Density: 831/km^{2} (2,150/sq mi)
- Time zone: UTC+1 (CET)
  - Summer (DST): UTC+2 (CEST)
- Postal code: 6573
- Dialing code: 024

Beek (Dutch pronunciation: [beːk]) is a village in the Dutch province of Gelderland. It is located in the municipality of Berg en Dal, about 5 km east of Nijmegen. It was sometimes referred to as "Beek (bij Nijmegen)" or "Beek-Ubbergen" because there are several villages in the Netherlands called Beek.

== History ==
It was first mentioned in 814–815 as Bechi, and means brook. The village dates from the early Middle Ages and was an agricultural community. In 1840, it was home to 715 people. In the late 19th century it became a popular place to build villas.

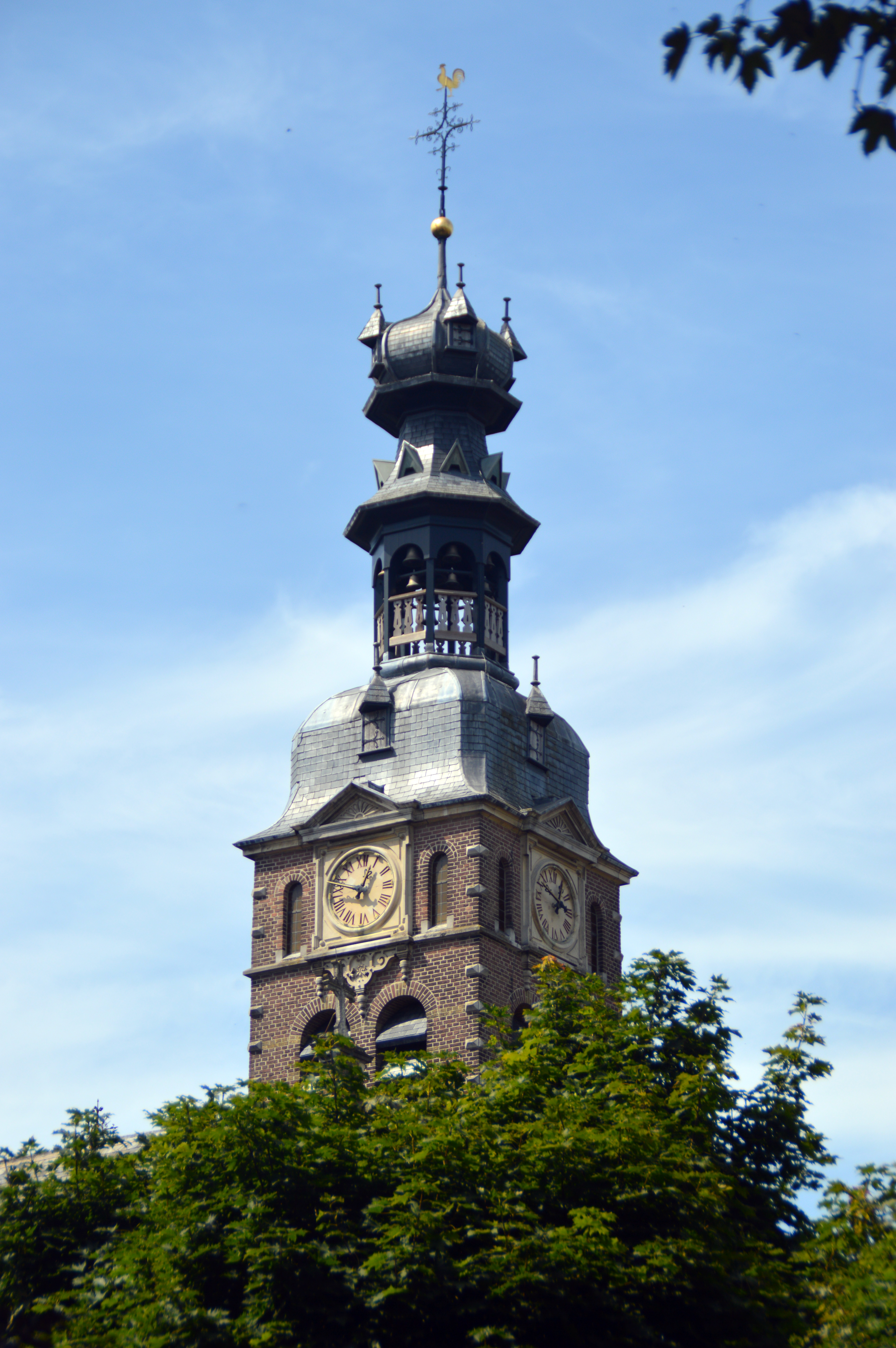
Spire of the St. Bartholomew's Church

The tower of the Saint Bartholomew's Church has elements which probably date from the 11th century. The current layout dates from 1650. Between 1948 and 1950, it was extensively repaired due to war damage.

Beek was a separate municipality until 1 January 1818, when it merged with "Ooij en Persingen" forming the municipality of Ubbergen. On 1 January 2015 "Ubbergen", "Groesbeek" and "Millingen aan de Rijn" merged into the enlarged municipality of Groesbeek, renamed Berg en Dal from 1 January 2016.

== Geology ==
Beek is part of the Lower Rhine Heights, a cross-border moraine that was formed in the penultimate Ice Age (the Saale glaciation), by the impoundments of glaciers and glacier tongues coming from the northeast.

== Nature ==
The Kabouterboom is a chestnut (castanea sativa) in the valley of Beek. The tree dates from the 17th century, and has a trunk of 8 to 9 metres, and is the thickest tree of the Netherlands.

== Notable people ==
- Isaac Nicolaas van Alphen (1854–1925), postmaster in Transvaal
- Sebastiaan Tromp (1889–1975), Jesuit priest, theologian
- Berend-Jan van Voorst tot Voorst (1944–2023), politician

== Gallery ==
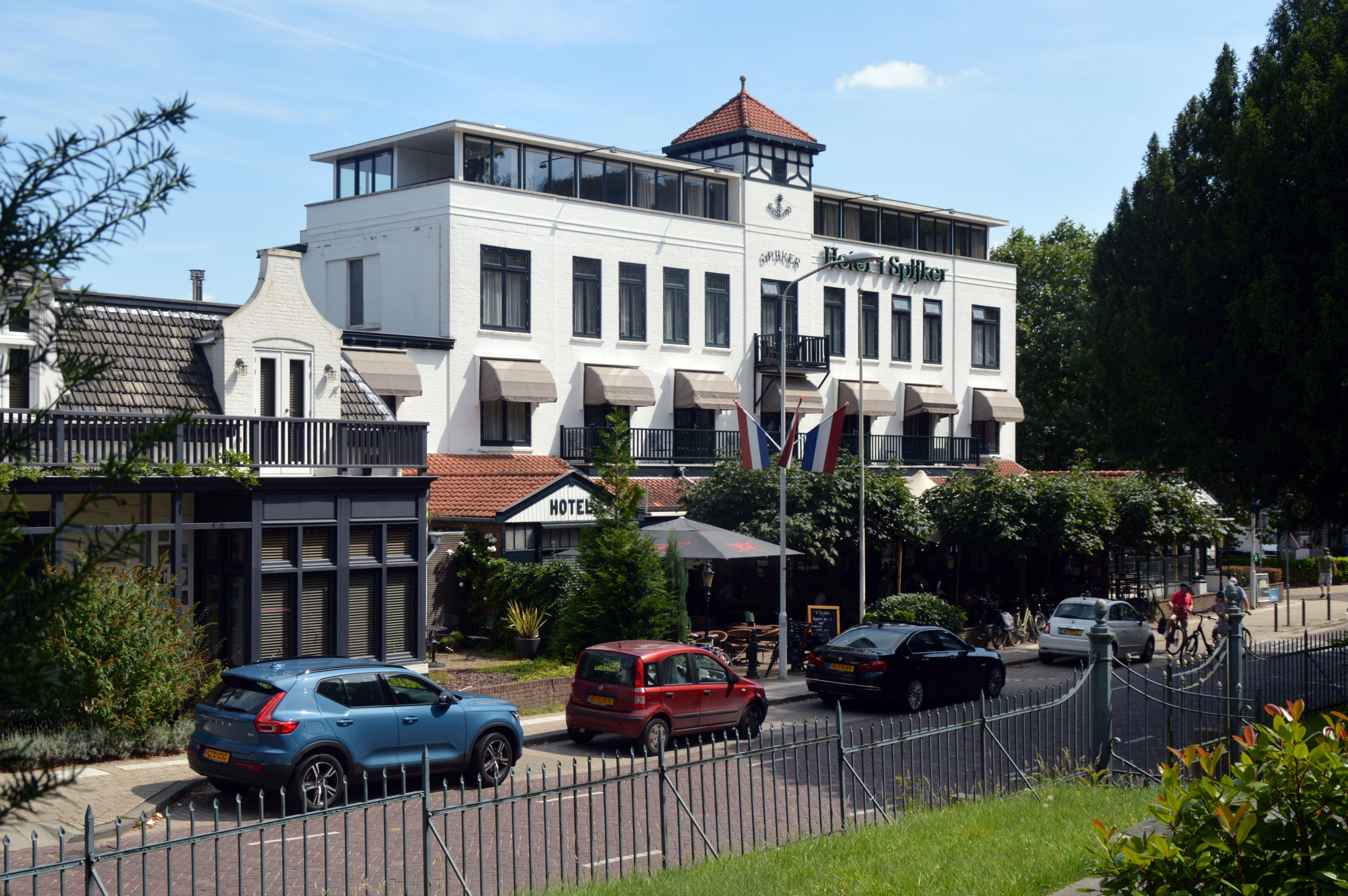
Hotel 't Spijker

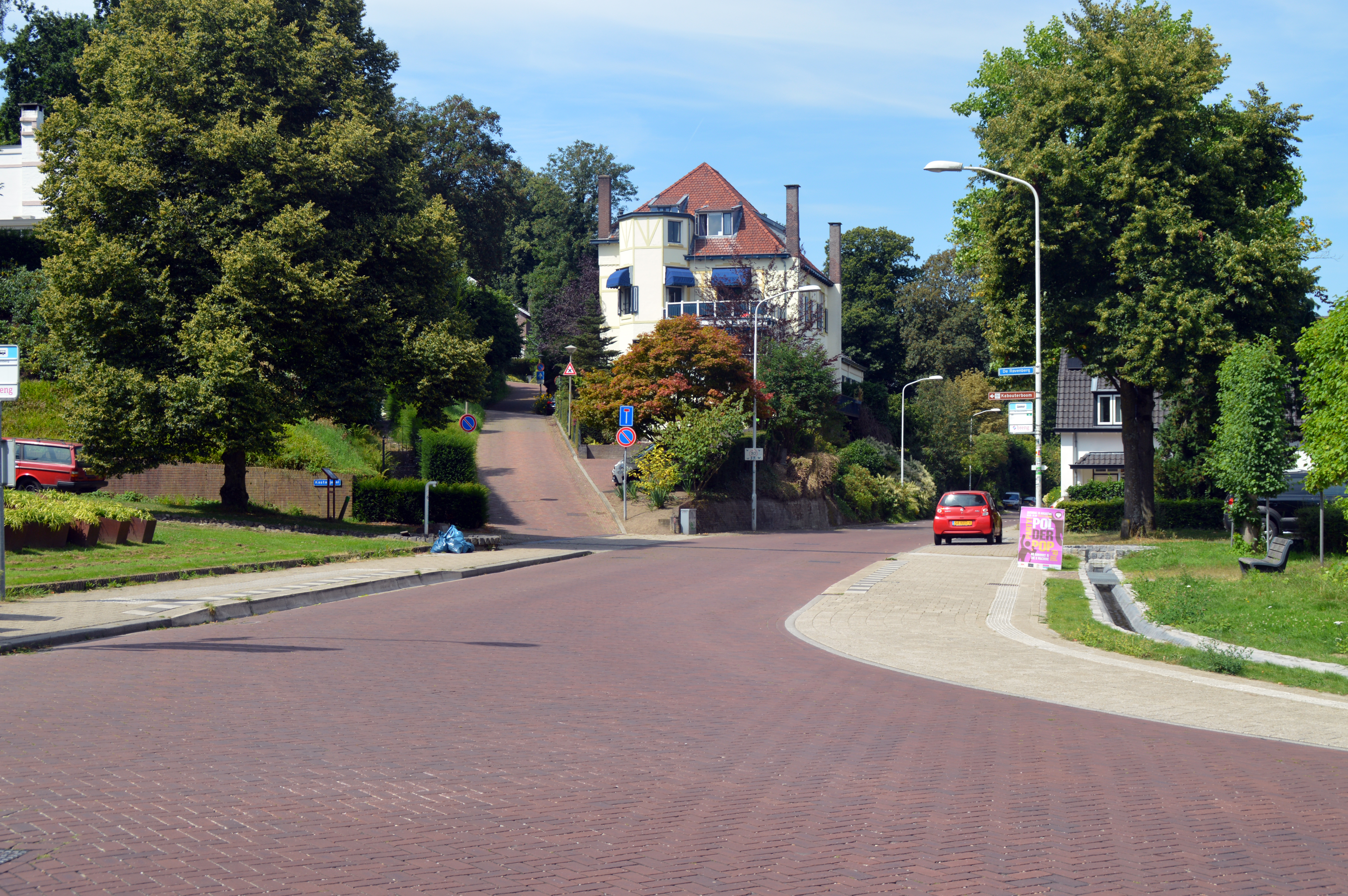
Rijksstraatweg

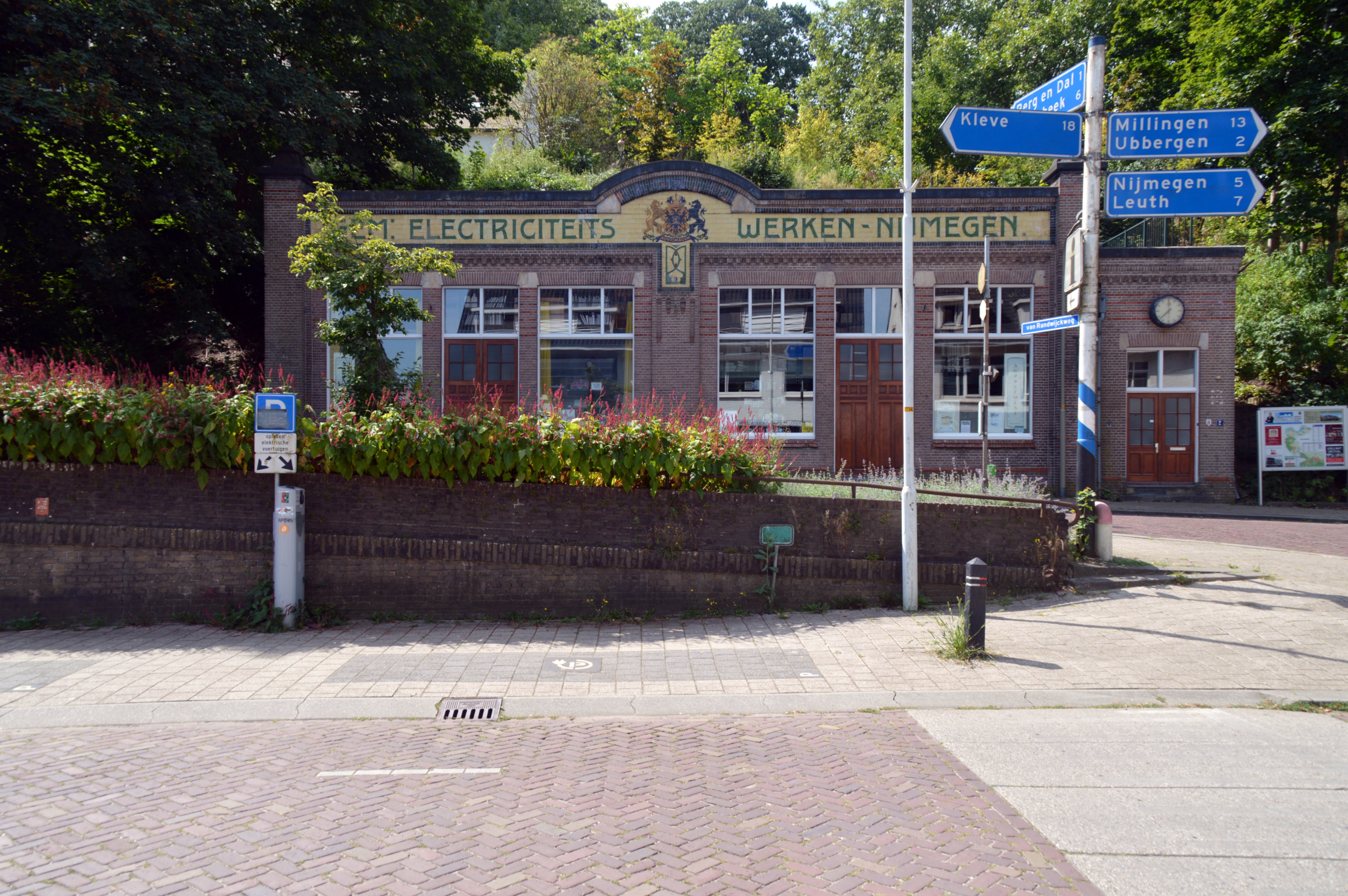
The former Municipal Electricity Works, where electricity was generated for the tram to Berg en Dal and Nijmegen.

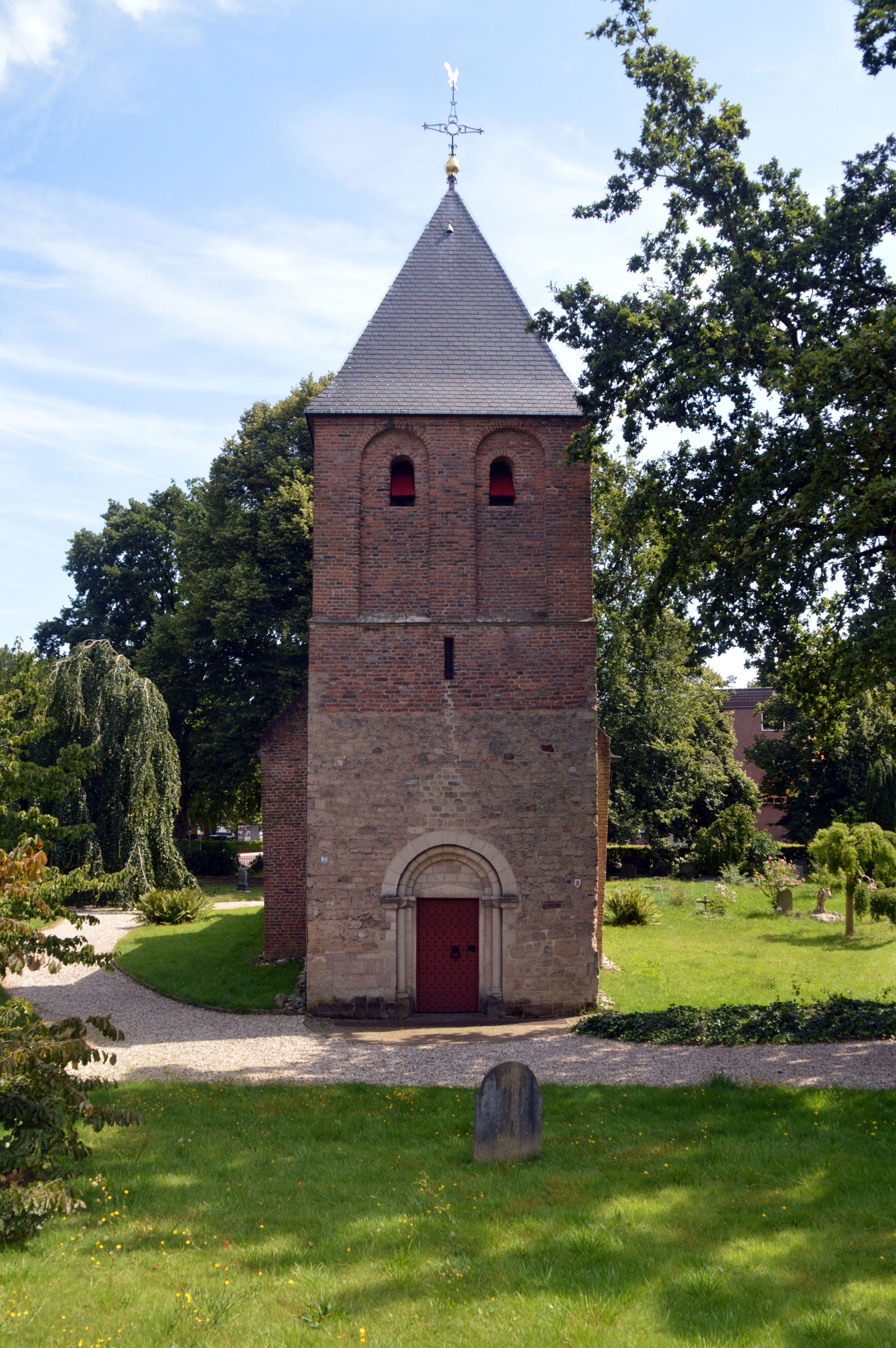
Tower and entrance of Bartholomew's Church
