= Friederich Jeppe =

German postmaster general (1834–1898)

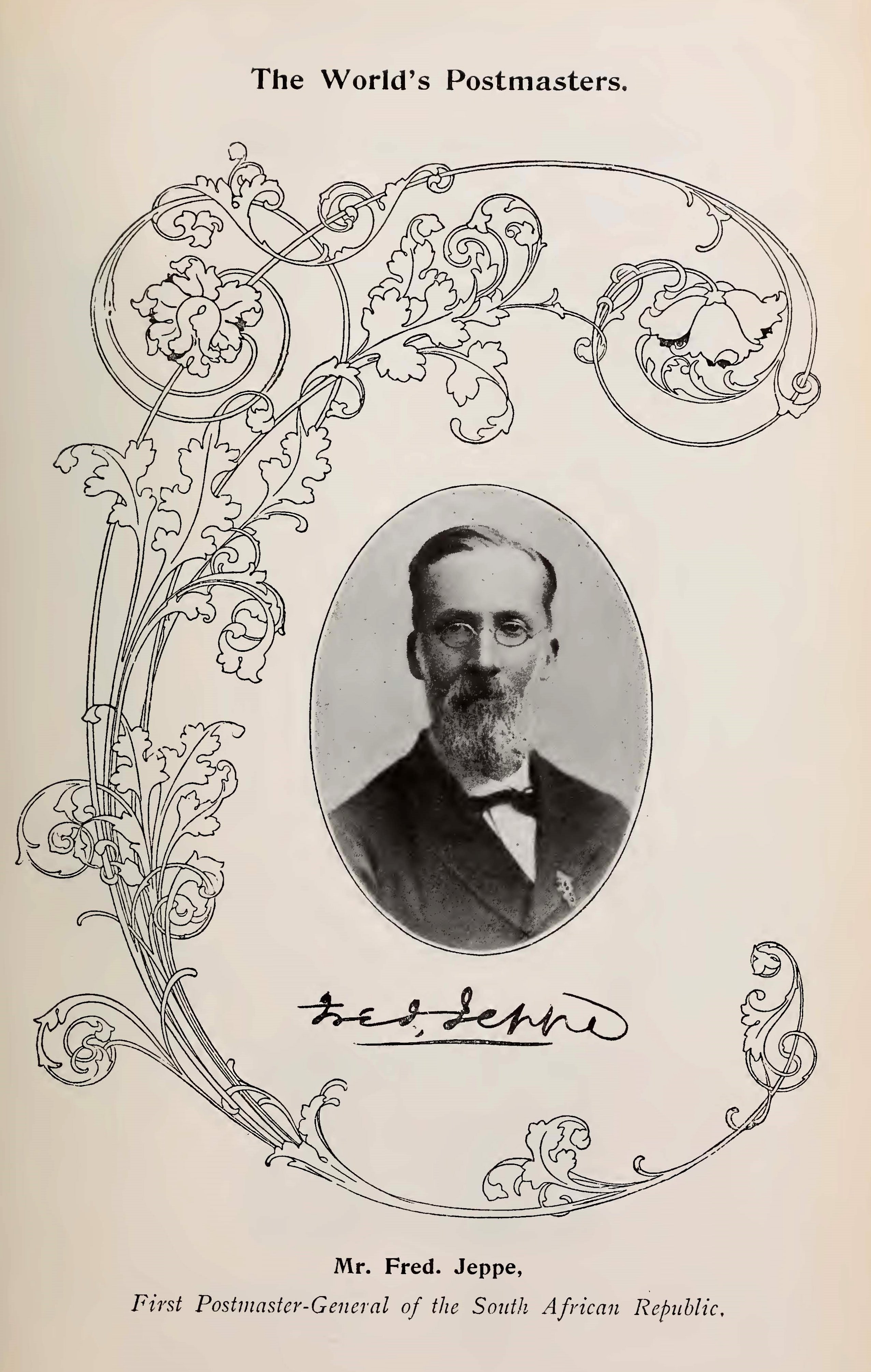
Friederich Jeppe

Friederich (Fred) Jeppe (Rostock, 1834 - 1898, Transvaal) was Postmaster General of the South African Republic.

== See also ==
- Isaac van Alphen
- Postage stamps and postal history of Transvaal
- Der Skandal, zwei Mecklenburger Buben erproben die Globalisierung im 19. Jahrhundert
