= Isaac Van Alphen =

Isaac Nicolaas van Alphen
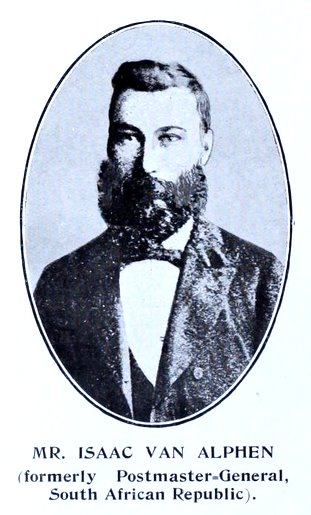

Personal details
- Born: 6 September 1854 Beek, Ubbergen, Netherlands
- Died: 26 November 1925 (aged 71) Pretoria, South Africa

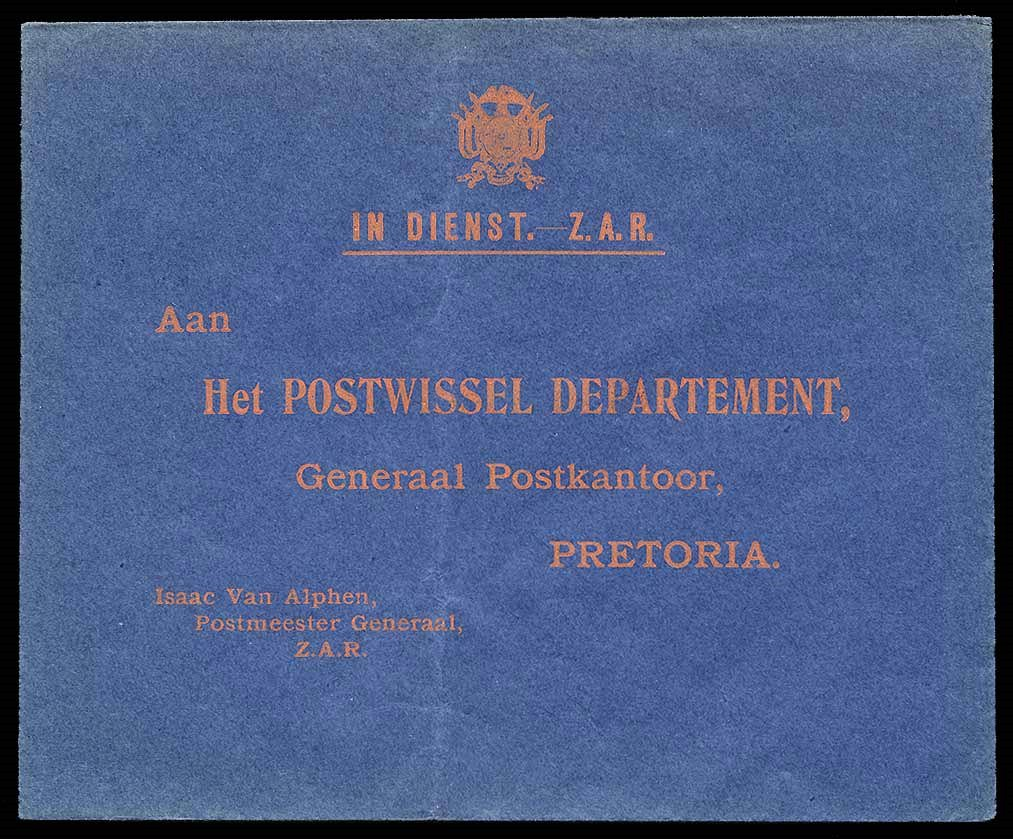
Official "In Dienst" (On Service) postal stationery envelope to Isaac Van Alphen.

Dr. Isaac Nicolaas van Alphen (6 September 1854 – 26 November 1925) was a Dutch-born South African journalist and Postmaster General during the Transvaal Second Republic, appointed on April 1, 1885.

== See also ==
- Friederich Jeppe
- Postage stamps and postal history of Transvaal
