= Postage stamps and postal history of Pietersburg =

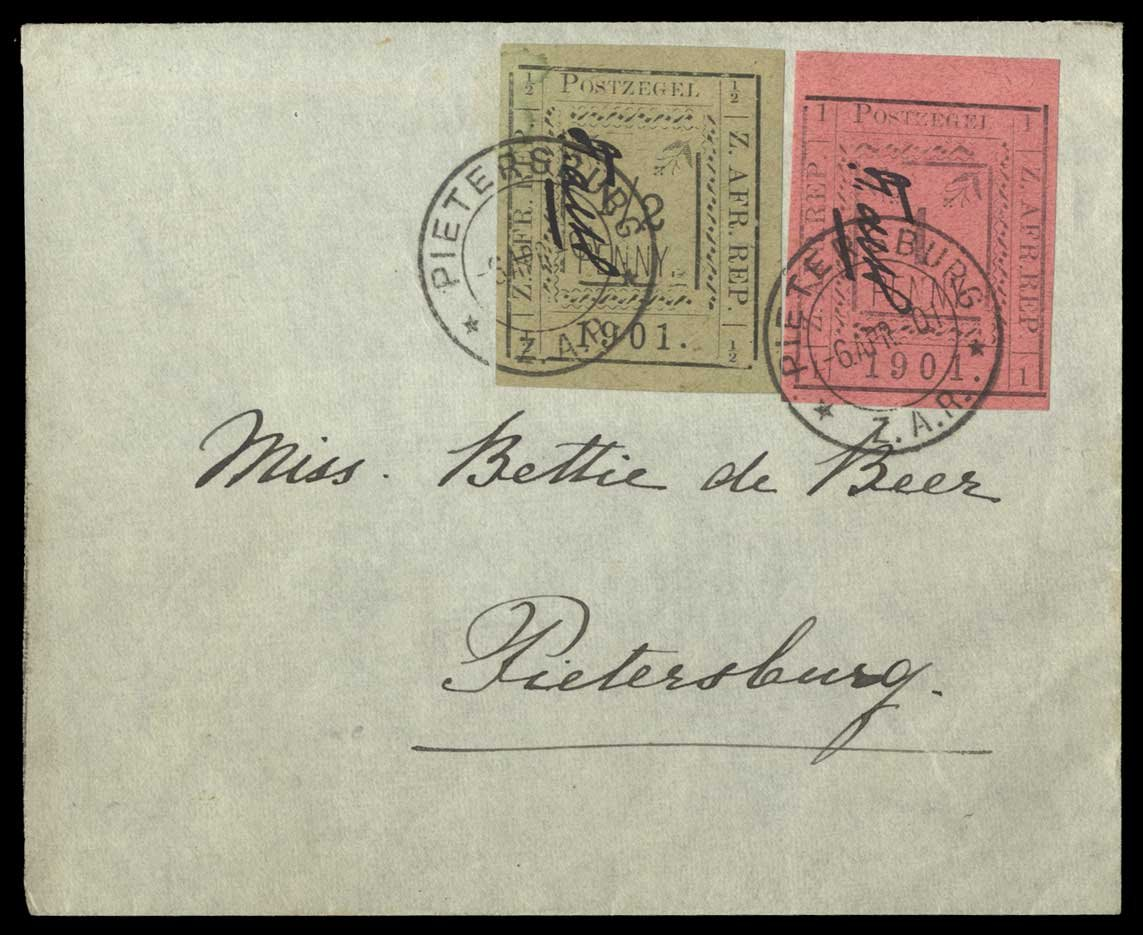
A 1901 cover of Pietersburg

This is a survey of the postage stamps and postal history of Pietersburg.

After the fall of Pretoria to the British in June 1900 during the Boer War, the Transvaal government re-located to Pietersburg. By March 1901, supplies of stamps were short and the Transvaal government authorised a series of type-set stamps for use within their area of control. The stamps were issued on 20 March 1901 and remained in use until Pietersburg was captured on 9 April, and as late as May in other places.

Although only in use for a short time, the stamps include a very large number of varieties caused by the conditions and method of their production. These make them popular with specialists.

== See also ==
- Postage stamps and postal history of Transvaal
