= Postage stamps and postal history of Natal =

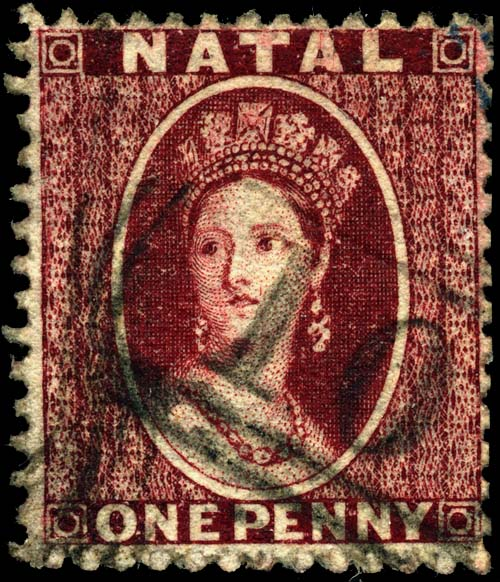
An 1863 stamp of Natal

This is a survey of the postage stamps and postal history of Natal. Natal was proclaimed a British colony on 4 May 1843 after the British had annexed the Boer Republic of Natalia.

The first stamps of Natal were issued on 26 May 1857. They were uncoloured designs embossed in plain relief on coloured wove paper and were imperforate. The first stamps of Natal after these were issued in 1859, with the Chalon head portrait of Queen Victoria. Between 1869 and 1895, postage stamps of 1859–1867 and fiscal stamps were overprinted 'POSTAGE' in various styles or additionally surcharged 'Half-Penny'. Stamps of King Edward VII were issued between 1902 and 1909. Six official stamps of King Edward were also issued.

In 1910 Natal combined with three other colonies to form the Union of South Africa.

== See also ==
- Postage stamps and postal history of Zululand
