= Postage stamps and postal history of Zululand =

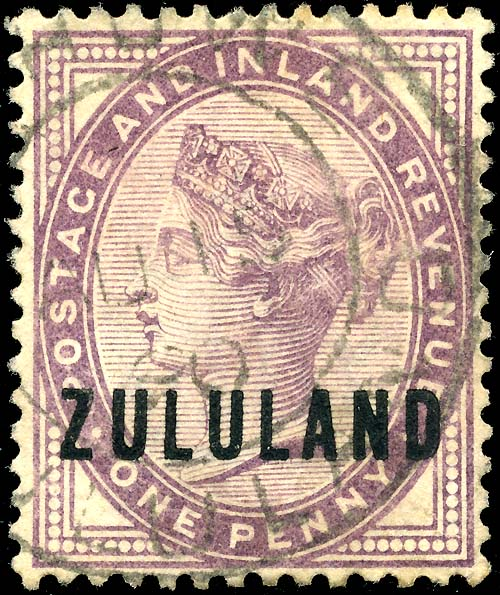
This overprinted British stamp was used at Eshowe in August 1890.

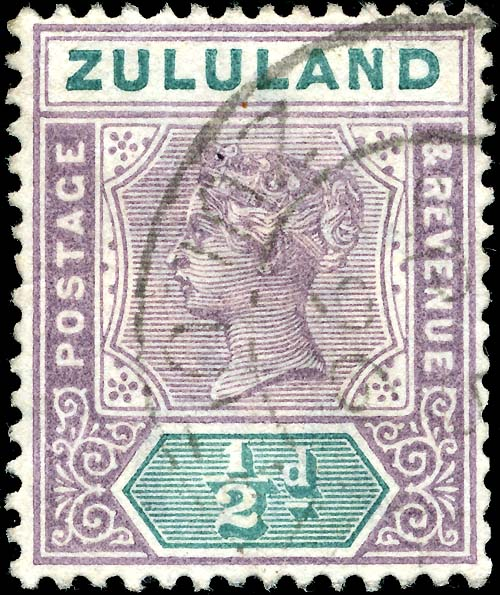
An 1894 halfpenny of the Key Plate issue, used in 1896

This is a survey of the postage stamps and postal history of Zululand under British rule.

The Zulu Kingdom was defeated by Britain in the Anglo-Zulu War and was annexed as a British territory in 1887. For a brief period, it operated its own postal system and had its own postage stamps.

== First post office ==
A Natal postal agency was established in Eshowe in 1876 (closed between 1879 and 1885), but an official postal system was not started until 1 May 1888, at which time both Zululand and neighbouring Natal became members of the Universal Postal Union. At first, the territory used postage stamps of Great Britain and Natal overprinted "ZULULAND".

== Key type stamps ==
A series of ten definitive issues in the key plate style with a profile of Queen Victoria, inscribed "ZULULAND" appeared in 1894 and were in use at 21 post offices. These stamps ranged in denomination from 1/2 penny to five pounds.

== Annexation ==
Zululand was annexed by Natal on 31 December 1897, and separate stamps were discontinued on 30 June 1898.

== See also ==
- Postage stamps and postal history of Natal
- Zululand
- Revenue stamps of Zululand

== References and sources ==
Sources

- Encyclopaedia of Postal Authorities
- Rossiter, Stuart & John Flower. The Stamp Atlas. London: Macdonald, 1986. ISBN 0-356-10862-7
