= Postage stamps and postal history of South Africa =

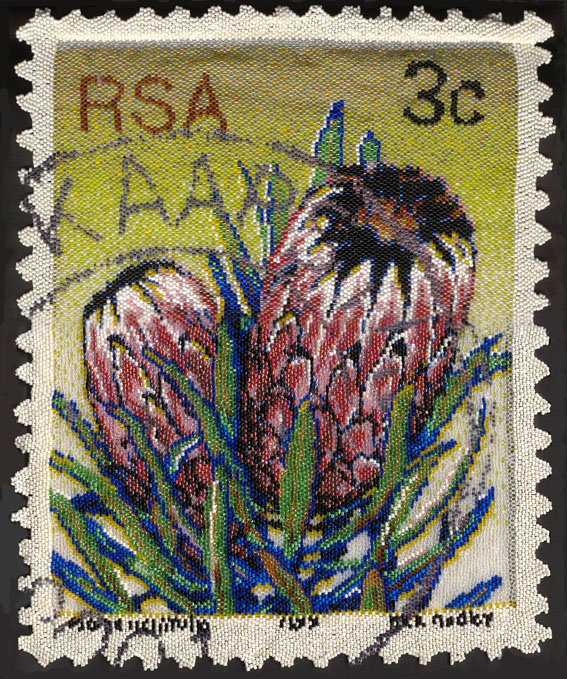
1977 stamp of South Africa

This is a survey of the postage stamps and postal history of South Africa.

The Republic of South Africa, previously The Union of South Africa, is a country located at the southern tip of Africa, with a coastline on the Atlantic and Indian Oceans. To the north lie Namibia, Botswana and Zimbabwe; to the east are Mozambique and Swaziland; while Lesotho is an Independent country wholly surrounded by South African territory.

== Pre-Union States ==
1885 map of South Africa

Before South Africa was united in 1910, each part of what would later become South Africa issued their own stamps. These were:

- Cape of Good Hope (1853–1904)
- Natal (1857–1909)
- Orange Free State (1868–1897, annexed to Orange River Colony)
- South African Republic (1869–1877 and 1882–1897, annexed to Transvaal)
- Griqualand West (1874–1879, annexed to Cape Colony)
- Transvaal (1877–1880 and 1900–1909)
- Stellaland (1884–1885, annexed to British Bechuanaland)
- British Bechuanaland (1885–1895, annexed to Cape Colony)
- New Republic (1886–1887, annexed to South African Republic)
- Zululand (1888–1896, annexed to Natal)
- Orange River Colony (1900–1909)

During the Second Boer War, some cities issued their own stamps. These were:

- Lydenburg (1900)
- Mafeking (1900)
- Pietersburg (1901)
- Rustenburg (1900)
- Schweizer Renecke (1900)
- Volksrust (1902)
- Vryburg (1899–1900)
- Wolmaransstad (1900).

== Union of South Africa (1910–1961) ==
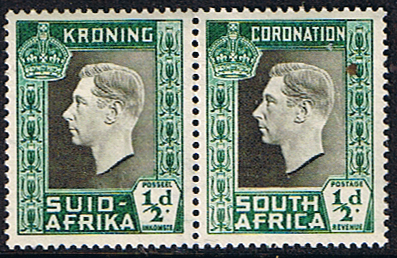
1937 stamps of South Africa

The first stamp of the Union of South Africa was a 2 1/2d stamp issued on 4 November 1910. It portrayed the Monarch King George V and the arms of the four British colonies which formed the Union: Cape Colony, Natal, Orange River Colony and Transvaal. Most South African stamps issued between 1926 and 1951 were in pairs. One was inscribed 'SOUTH AFRICA' and the other 'SUIDAFRIKA' or 'SUID-AFRIKA'.

Further commemorative and special issues followed throughout the 1930s, including issues for the Silver Jubilee of King George V and the Coronation of King George VI.

The Second World War was the impetus for another well-known South African stamp format, the so-called “bantams”. In 1941 a set of stamps was issued to publicise the War Effort. Between 1942 and 1944 these stamps were reprinted in a much smaller format, between half and one third the size of the previously issued stamps, hence the nickname “bantam”.

Although still utilising the by now familiar bilingual pairs format, each unit of either two or three stamps was subdivided by means of roulettes, rather than the more normal perforations.

After the end of the Second World War, the push for full independence from Great Britain intensified. This was achieved in 1961 when the Union of South Africa became the Republic of South Africa. Along with a change of name, there was also a change of currency.

The change of currency took place in February, which resulted in a stop-gap measure of several previously issued stamps being reprinted in the new currency. Stamps inscribed with the new name and currency were ready to be issued on the first day of independence, 31 May 1961, although the bilingual pairs format was no longer in use, with each stamp being inscribed in both English and Afrikaans.

== Republic of South Africa (1961-) ==
The first set of the Republic was issued on 31 May 1961. From 1961 to 1966, stamps were inscribed "REPUBLIC OF SOUTH AFRICA - REPUBLIEK VAN SUID-AFRIKA". However, from 1967 stamps were simply inscribed "RSA". Modern issues are just inscribed "South Africa".

The country's most (in)famous stamp, the withdrawn “Word of God” 40c stamp, was released in 1987.

The stamp was to have been released as part of a set of four commemorating the Bible Society of South Africa, but was withdrawn after objections to the use of the Hebrew word for “God”. Nevertheless, a number of examples were sold at smaller post offices on the day of issue before notification of the withdrawal was received.

== South African Bantustans ==
The South African Bantustans of Bophuthatswana (1977–1994), Ciskei (1981–1994), Transkei (1976–1994) and Venda (1979–1994) also issued their own stamps.

The South African Bantustans' stamps are given full listing in Stanley Gibbons' Catalogue of British Commonwealth Stamps.

== See also ==
- Revenue stamps of South Africa
- Postage stamps and postal history of Pietersburg
