= Postage stamps and postal history of Griqualand West =

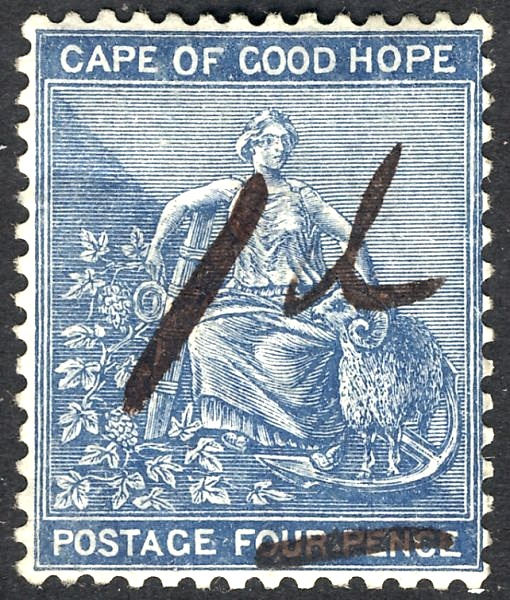
An 1874 stamp of Cape of Good Hope, surcharged by the local postmaster for use in Griqualand West

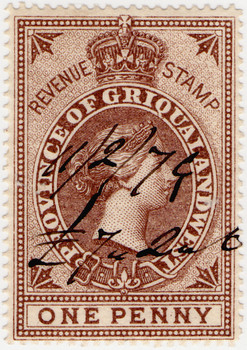
A one penny 1879 revenue stamp of Griqualand West

This is a survey of the postage stamps and postal history of Griqualand West, a former British colony that is now part of South Africa.

== First stamps ==
The first stamps used in Griqualand West were stamps of Cape of Good Hope from October 1871 which can be identified by their cancellations.

In September 1877, Cape 4 pence stamps were used hand surcharged by the Kimberley postmaster "1d" in ink.

The first stamps specifically for Griqualand West were issued in March 1877 and consisted of stamps of Cape of Good Hope overprinted G. W. or G.

In 1880, Griqualand West was annexed by the Cape Colony.

== See also ==
- Postage stamps and postal history of the Cape of Good Hope
