= Revenue stamps of Basutoland and Lesotho =

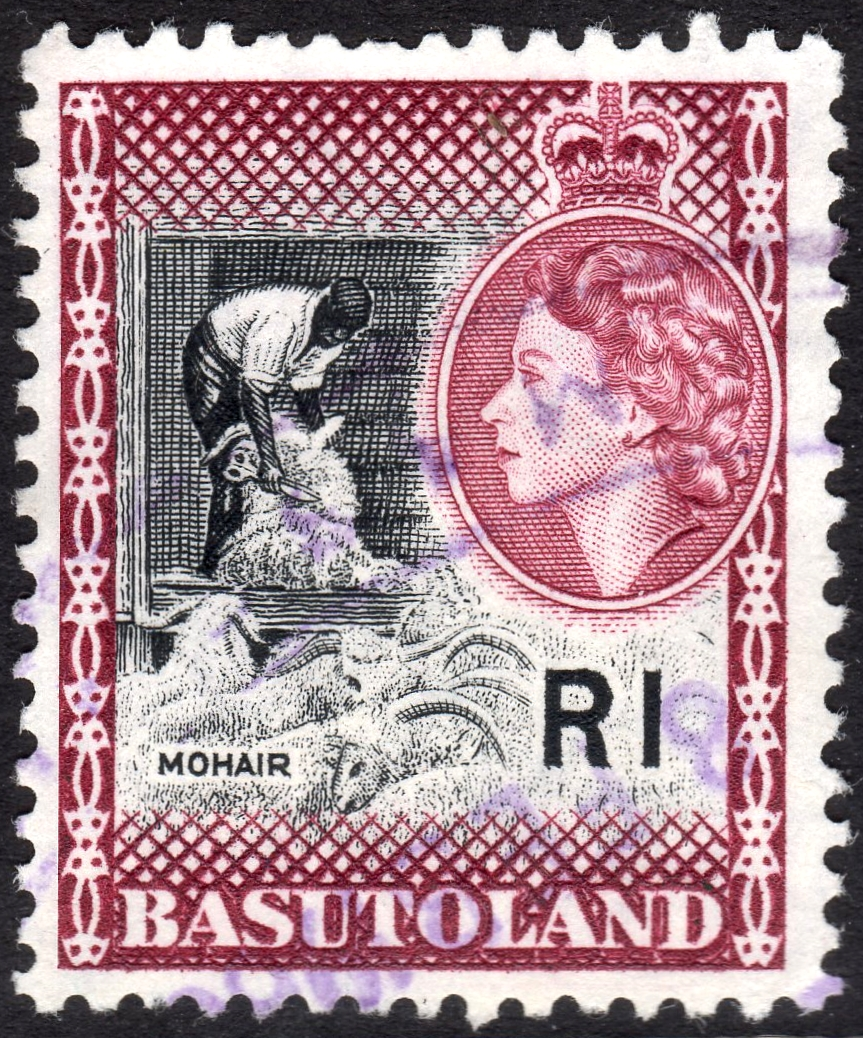
A 1963 Basutoland R1 postage & revenue stamp fiscally used.

Basutoland, now known as Lesotho, first issued revenue stamps in 1900 and continues to do so.

== Basutoland ==
Basutoland's first revenues were issued in 1900. From that year until 1913, various revenues of the Cape of Good Hope and the Orange River Colony were overprinted for the colony. From 1913 to 1946 various South African revenues were similarly overprinted. In 1933, a £1 value showing King George V and a crocodile was issued, similar to the postage stamps used at that time but with altered inscriptions. In 1953 two stamps with the portrait of Queen Elizabeth II and the colony's coat of arms were issued, and in 1961 these were overprinted in the new currency, the South African rand. Later that year similar designs inscribed in rand instead of just overprinted were issued, and a further surcharge was issued around 1967.

== Lesotho ==
Basutoland became independent as Lesotho in 1966. A year later, the country's first revenues were issued, with the main design being the coat of arms. These continued to be used for many years, until around 2006 a new design featuring a bird was issued. These remain in use to this day.

== See also ==
- Postage stamps and postal history of Lesotho
