= Revenue stamps of Bechuanaland =

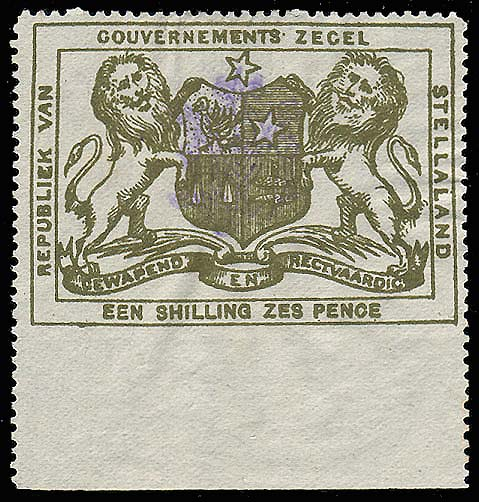
An 1886 Stellaland revenue stamp.

Bechuanaland first issued revenue stamps as Stellaland in 1884. Bechuanaland was split into British Bechuanaland and the Bechuanaland Protectorate. British Bechuanaland was added to the Cape Colony and the Bechuanaland Protectorate was governed from Mafeking until the seat of government was moved to Gaberone. The Bechuanaland Protectorate, now known as Botswana, continued to issue revenue stamps until 1976.

== Stellaland ==
Stellaland's first revenues were issued in 1884 with the republic's coat of arms. Two years later a number of them were issued handstamped with a monogram JPM since a number of the original stamps had been stolen.

== British Bechuanaland ==
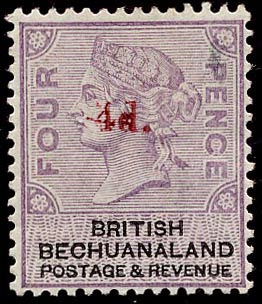
An 1888 British Bechuanaland postage & revenue stamp, that was intended mainly for fiscal use.

British Bechuanaland's first revenues were stamps of Stellaland with the country's name obliterated and British Bechuanaland added by hand in 1886. A year later Stellaland revenues were issued with a small blue handstamp with the name of the new colony. Both of these issues are extremely rare and hard to find. Later in 1887 Cape of Good Hope revenues were issued overprinted for British Bechuanaland. These were replaced by dual-purpose postage and revenue stamps later in 1887, but these were still mainly intended for fiscal rather than postal use.

== Bechuanaland Protectorate ==
The first revenues of the Bechuanaland Protectorate were issued in 1887, and were British Bechuanaland postage & revenue stamps overprinted Protectorate. Like the original issues these were valid for both postage and revenue, but were mainly used fiscally. From 1903 to 1913, revenues of the Cape of Good Hope and Transvaal were overprinted, and from 1914 to 1942 similar overprints were made on South African revenues. In 1918 British Bechuanaland 1s stamps were surcharged £5 for use as revenues however one exists postally used. In 1932, pictorial designs with the portrait of King George V similar to the contemporary postage stamps but with a different inscription were issued. Similar issues but with the portraits of King George VI and Queen Elizabeth II followed in 1938 and 1955 respectively. In 1961 the 1955 stamps were issued surcharged in South African rand. In 1965, a set of six stamps with face values from 25c to 4R was issued for Local Government Tax.

== Botswana ==
In 1968, a 10 rand revenue stamp with the country's coat of arms was issued. In 1976 a similar stamp was issued but with the face value in pula. In 1967, a set of six Local Government Tax stamps was issued similar to the similar Bechuanaland stamps. These were issued surcharged in pula in 1976, and later that year a set in new values was issued.

== Tati Concessions ==
In 1896 revenue stamps were issued for use in the Tati Concessions Land. Six stamps were issued with the design of an African elephant, and with the face values of 1s, 2s6d, 5s, 10s, £1 and £5. All of these are rare and now command high prices.

== See also ==
- Postage stamps and postal history of Botswana
- Postage stamps and postal history of Bechuanaland Protectorate
- Postage stamps and postal history of British Bechuanaland
- Postage stamps and postal history of Stellaland Republic
