= Postage stamps and postal history of the Cape of Good Hope =

1d Cape Triangular, SG 18

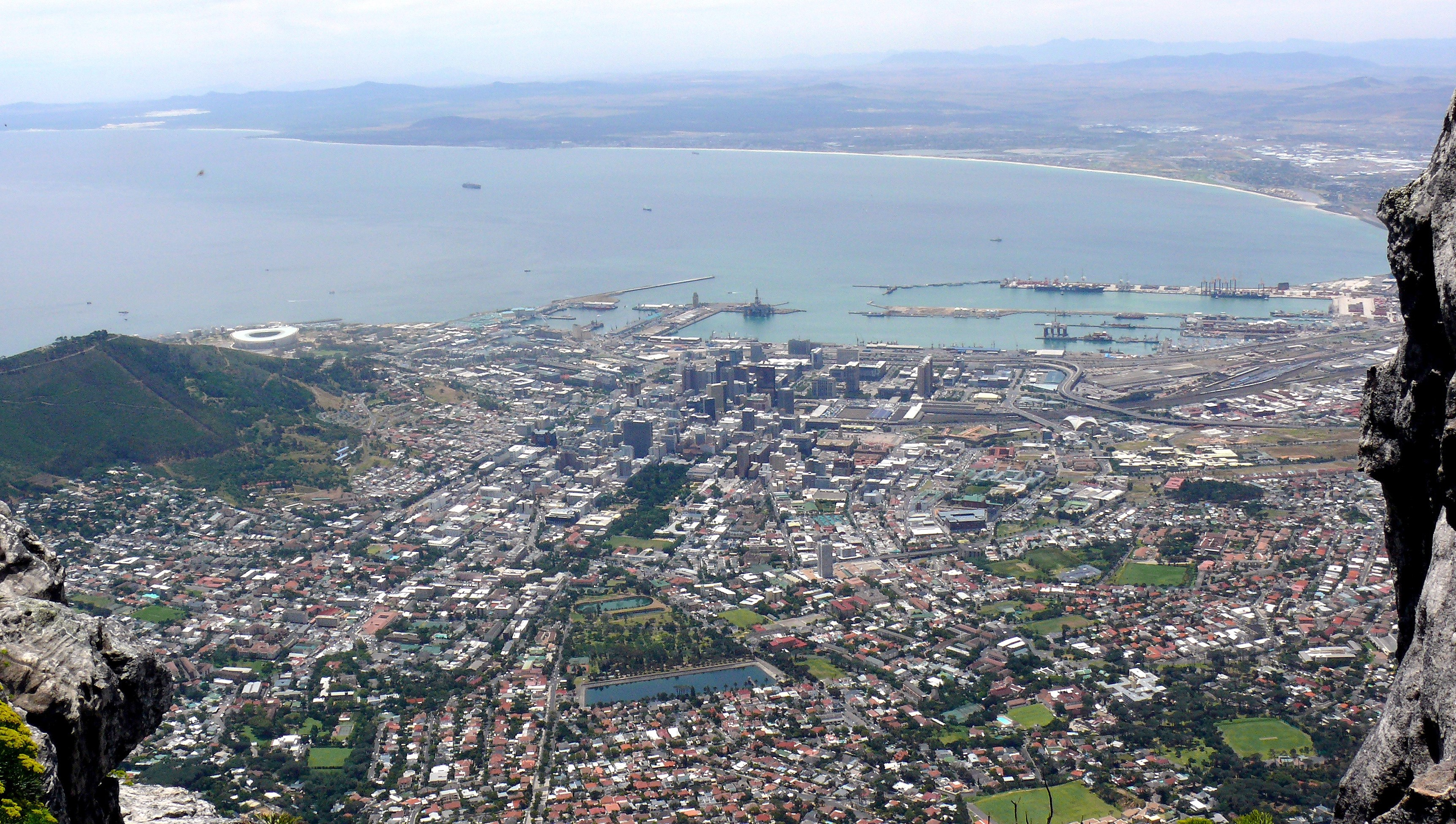
Table Bay, just north of Cape Town, was known as Saldanha Bay until 1601. Here, sailors exchanged packets of letters left under postal stones.

This is a survey of the postage stamps and postal history of Cape of Good Hope.

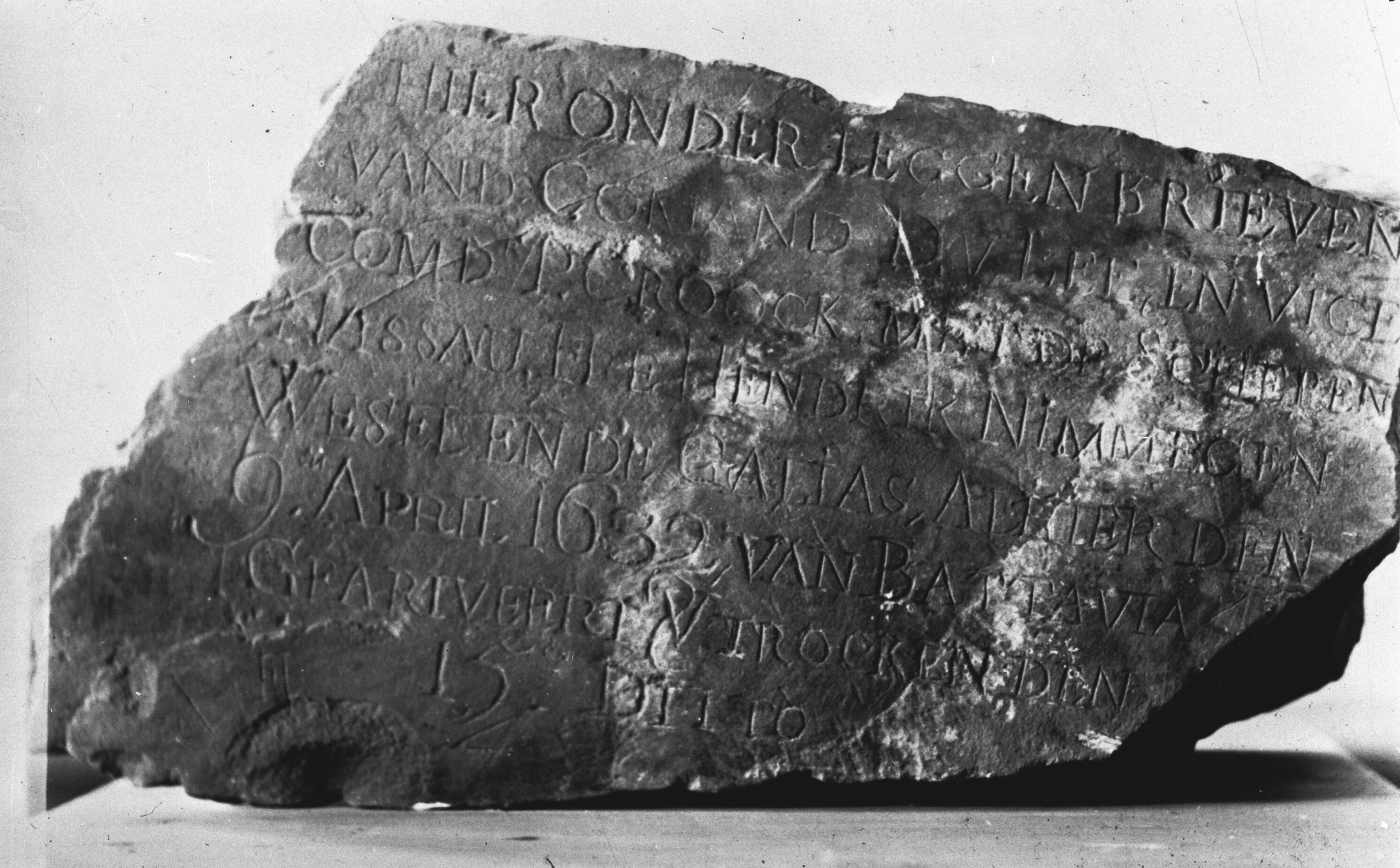
Postal stone (1632)

The Portuguese were the first Europeans to reach the Cape of Good Hope in 1488, led by the explorer Bartolomeu Dias. Table Bay, for over one hundred years known as Saldanha (named after one of Albuquerque's sea captains), became a convenient harbor on the long, hard and dangerous sea voyage to the East. Here letters were left and exchanged with ships sailing back to Europe. Frequently, packets of letters were left under postal stones inscribed in French, Dutch and Danish, which became the first, unmanned, post offices of the Cape. The earliest of these, dated 1619, was inscribed in English. A supply camp was established by the Dutch East India Company in 1652 in the area which later became Cape Town. It was first occupied by British Forces in 1795. Since 1814 it was a British Colony until it was incorporated into the Union of South Africa, as the Cape Province, on 31 May 1910.

== The first triangular stamps ==
4d Cape Triangular, SG 19

Stamps were first issued by the colony on 1 September 1853. The two stamps that were issued were a one penny in brick-red and a four pence in blue. The unusual shape of the stamps was probably inspired by the large triangular obliterator used by the Cape Revenue Department from 1839. The stamps were printed by Messrs Perkins, Bacon & Co in London. The original die for these stamps was cut by William Humphrys, an engraver employed by Perkins Bacon. Sheets of a special handmade paper, measuring 282 mm by 536 mm, were used to print 240 stamps per sheet. The stamps were issued imperforate, like the early British stamps, meaning that postmasters had to use scissors or a knife to separate them. The rate of postage within the colony was 4d for a half ounce letter and 1d for a newspaper.

On 18 February 1858 two new values became available: a six pence and a one shilling. The six pence rate was for payment of half ounce letters to Great Britain and the one shilling rate was for postage to some foreign countries. On 15 September 1860 the rate for local letters in Cape Town was reduced to one penny. A similar reduction was made in Port Elizabeth on 1 May 1861.

On 1 April 1863 the rate to Great Britain was increased to one shilling, if sent by mail packet, and reduced to four pence, if sent by private vessels.

The triangular stamps were demonetised on 1 October 1900.

== The so-called Wood-Blocks ==
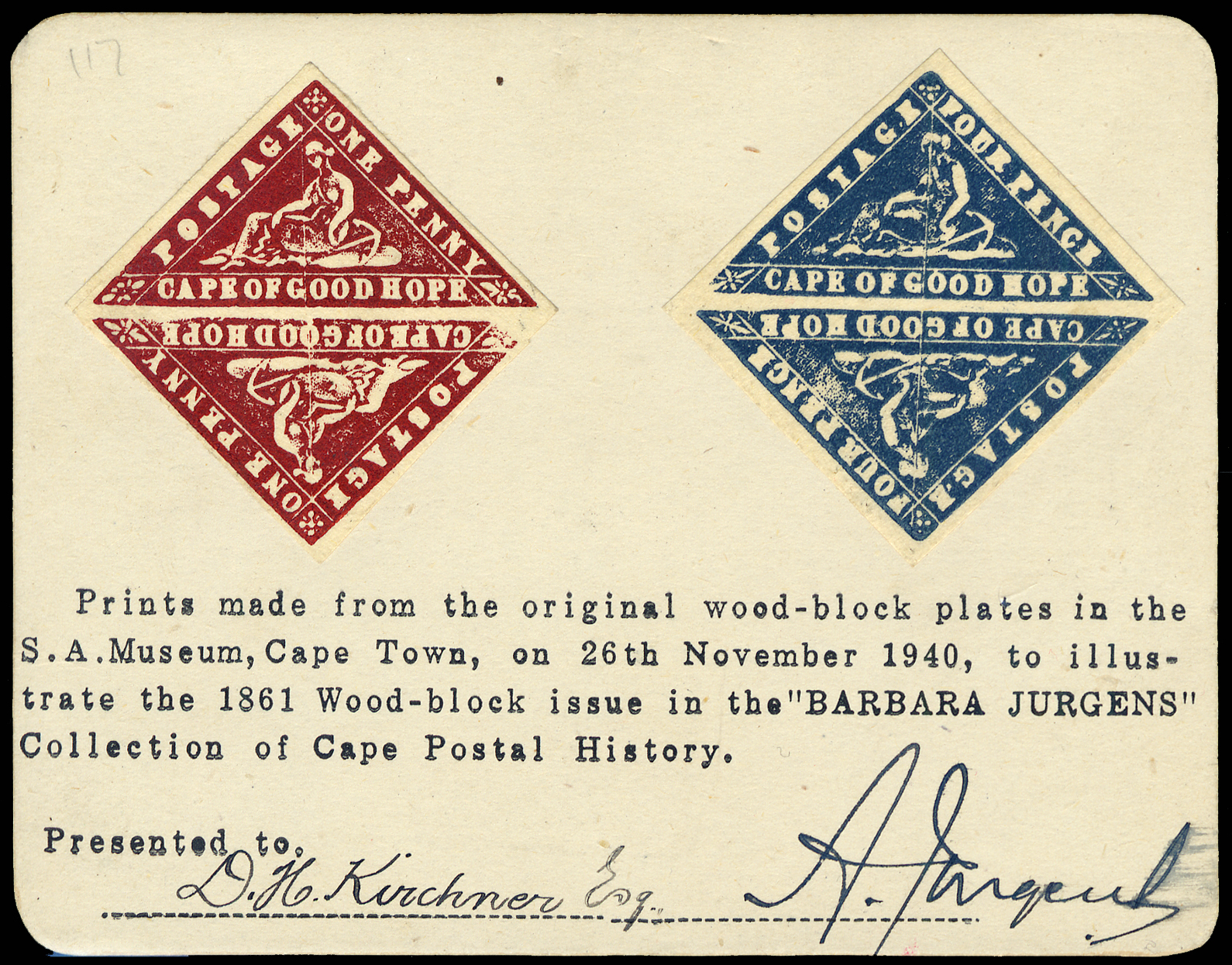
Prints from the original wood-blocks

Due to a shortage of one penny and four pence stamps, a local printer, Messrs. Saul Solomon & Co., was employed to provide a supply of 125,102 one penny and 113,256 four pence stamps, and these were issued in February 1861. It was then discovered that a consignment of stamps from London had already arrived, on 5 May 1860, although the bills of lading had gone astray. A year later the cases with the stamps from London were claimed.

Despite the popular nickname, the stamps were in fact engraved on steel by C.J Roberts. Each stamp was individually cut into a single piece of metal (known as a cliche) so there are many slight variations. 64 cliches were then glued to wooden blocks for printing. Two were accidentally placed into the wrong set, resulting in one colour error per sheet of 64 - a blue penny stamp and a red four pence stamp - which have always been highly prized rarities.

== Hope issues ==
In 1864, a new issue replaced the triangular issues. This showed the allegorical figure of Hope seated with a ram and vines. Until 1893, this was the only design except for the triangulars. In 1893, a 1d stamp was issued portraying Hope standing, and in 1898 and 1902, this design was reused for 1/2d and 3d values. The sitting Hope stamps continued to be issued until 1898.

== Later issues ==
In 1900, a 1d stamp was issued showing Table Mountain and the Arms of the Colony. This was the first stamp not portraying Hope. The final issue, between 1902 and 1904, was a set of nine values portraying King Edward VII.

== Union of South Africa ==
In 1910, the Union of South Africa was formed from the colonies of Cape of Good Hope, Transvaal, Natal and Orange River Colony. All Cape stamps except the triangulars were valid for use in all of the Union until they were demonetised on 31 December 1937, along with the issues of Transvaal, Natal and Orange River Colony.

== Postal stationery ==
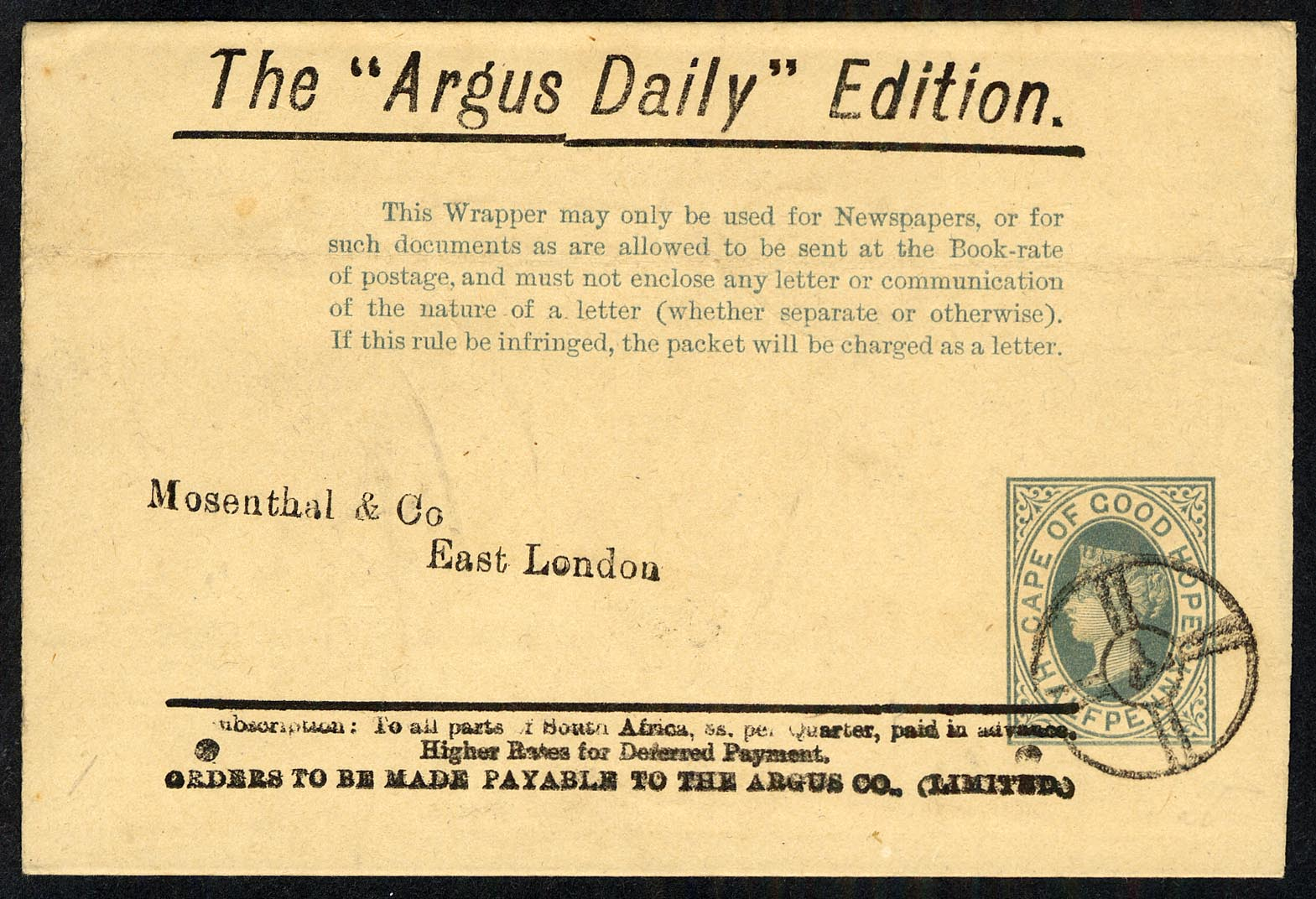
Cape of Good Hope 1882 newspaper wrapper with overprint for Argus Daily

The first items of postal stationery to be issued by the Cape of Good Hope were postcards in 1878; registration envelopes and newspaper wrappers were first issued in 1882; post paid envelopes in 1892 and lettercards in 1895.

The designs of all the postal stationery used the head of either Queen Victoria or King Edward VII apart from the very first postcard, issued in 1878, which had a design of “Hope”.

== See also ==
- Postage stamps and postal history of Griqualand West
