= Postage stamps and postal history of Transvaal =

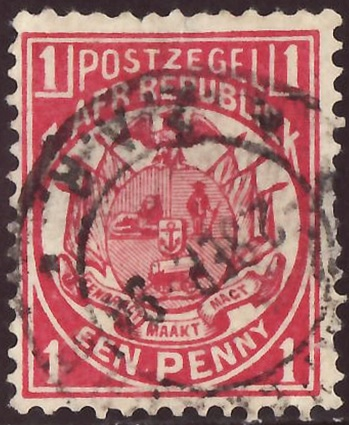
An 1885 stamp of the South African Republic, showing the coat of arms of the republic

This is a survey of the postage stamps and postal history of Transvaal, formerly known as the South African Republic (Zuid-Afrikaansche Republiek, ZAR).

== 1869–1877 ==
The first stamps of the South African Republic were issued on 1 May 1870, showing the coat of arms of the republic.

== 1877–1880 ==
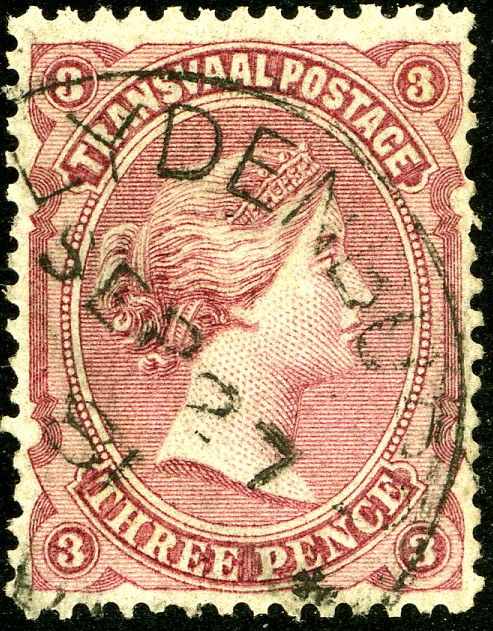
An 1878 stamp of Transvaal

The South African Republic was annexed by Britain in 1877. A set of definitives depicting Queen Victoria was issued in 1878.

== 1882–1897 ==
The first Anglo-Boer War broke out in 1880. The conflict ended with a decisive Boer victory at the Battle of Majuba Hill and the republic regained its independence.

The republic again issued stamps with the coat of arms in the designs.

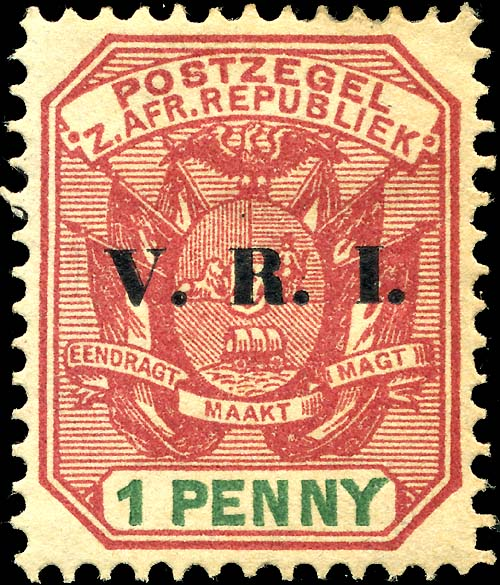
A stamp of ZAR overprinted "V.R.I." in 1900

== 1900–1909 ==
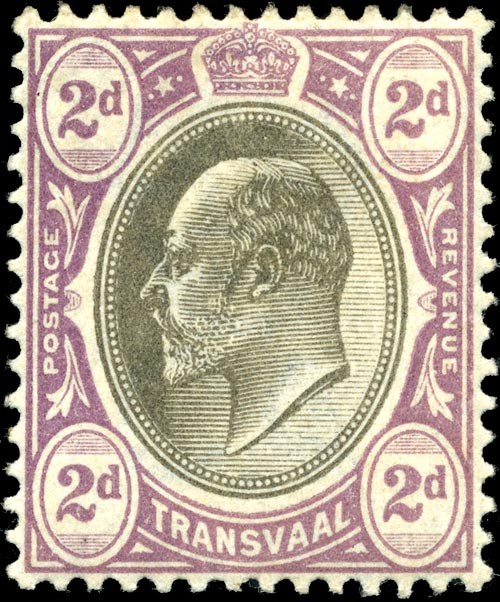
A 1902 stamp of Transvaal

The Second Boer War erupted in 1899, the war ended the existence of the South African Republic.

Stamps of the South African Republic were overprinted "V.R.I." (Victoria Regina Imperatrix, Latin for Victoria, Queen and Empress) or "E.R.I." (Edward Rex Imperator, for Edward VII) between 1900 and 1902. In 1902 stamps for the Transvaal Colony were issued.

Transvaal was incorporated into the Union of South Africa in 1910.

== See also ==
- Adolph Otto
- Emil Tamsen
- Revenue stamps of Transvaal
- Postage stamps and postal history of South Africa
