= Revenue stamps of Uganda =

The national bird of Uganda, the Grey crowned crane, appeared on many of the country's revenue stamps.

Uganda issued revenue stamps from around 1896 to the 1990s. There were numerous types of revenue stamps for a variety of taxes and fees.

== British Protectorate ==
The British Vice Consul used Uganda's typeset postal stamps for tax purposes in 1896. These stamps did not bear any printed overprint, but the word Consular was handwritten in manuscript diagonally on the stamps. The 1898 stamps portraying Queen Victoria also exist with this manuscript overprint.

In around 1898, the same Queen Victoria stamps were issued with an overprint reading Inland Revenue for use as general-duty fiscal stamps. These were replaced by East Africa and Uganda stamps overprinted Uganda Revenue in around 1903. Similar overprints were later issued on stamps of Kenya and Uganda or Kenya, Uganda and Tanganyika. Similar overprints remained in use on nearly every definitive issue up to independence.

From 1932 to 1938, various Luwalo stamps were issued to pay a labour-related tax. No issued examples are known to have survived and the only copies are specimens in the Foreign and Commonwealth Office Collection of the British Library. These were replaced by poll tax stamps in 1940, which were Nyasaland key types showing King George VI. These remained in use until the 1950s.

In the 1930s, various Uganda revenues (previously overprinted on Kenya & Uganda or KUT stamps) were additionally overprinted to pay the motor driver's licence. From around 1946 to the mid-1950s, the 10/- value from the contemporary KUT George VI definitive issue were overprinted for use as immigration stamps. There are three types of the overprint.

Impressed duty stamps were introduced in Uganda in 1918 showing a design of a crown and leaves. These remained in use until the 1960s.

== Independent ==
Uganda became an independent sovereign state on 9 October 1962. Postage stamps were issued for the occasion, and they were also later overprinted for fiscal use. The Uganda Revenue overprints were also applied to some values of the 1965 birds definitive. A new type featuring a crowned crane was issued in 1966, and it was reissued with a different watermark in around 1970. General duty revenue stamps are no longer in use in Uganda.

Around 1965, large white labels were issued to pay the airport service charge. In November 1973, a set of two-part stamps was issued to pay the levy on commercial transactions. A self-adhesive stamps showing Entebbe International Airport was issued in the 1990s to pay the passenger service chargee. The Uganda Revenue Authority issues various excise stamps to pay the tax on cigarettes up to this day.

Impressed duty stamps in vermilion showing a grey crowned crane were introduced in the 1970s and remain in use.

=== Buganda ===
A set of 10 stamps inscribed GRADUATED TAX BUGANDA and portraying King Mutesa II was prepared in early 1963. Only the 1/- value is known as an issued stamp.

== See also ==
- Revenue stamps of Kenya
- Postage stamps and postal history of Uganda
