= Postage stamps and postal history of British East Africa =

This is a survey of the postage stamps and postal history of British East Africa.

Britain had interests in this area as early as 1824. Missionaries are known to have settled in the area in 1844. The Imperial British East Africa Company obtained a concession in 1887 to administer this area, from Sultan Bargash of the Sultanate of Zanzibar. The company started to experience financial difficulties in 1891. The situation was made more difficult in 1892 when Britain declared the Sultanate of Zanzibar part of the Congo Free Trade Zone and thus depriving the company of import duties. On 1 July 1895, the British government took over the administration of this area when the company was facing bankruptcy.

== Pre-stamp era ==
The early missionaries in British East Africa sent letters by runner to forwarding agents in Zanzibar. Letters are known from as early as 1848. From 1875 mail was sent via the Indian post office which had been opened in Zanzibar.

== Imperial British East Africa Company administration ==
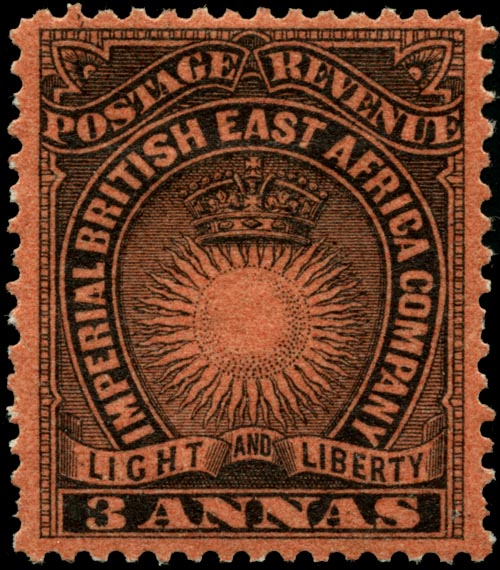
A Sun and Crown stamp of 1890

The Imperial British East Africa Company was the first company holding a Royal Charter allowing operation of a postal system, for both local and international mail, to use their company name on their stamps. They were also the first to create a series of surcharged stamps with authorizing initials. Both of these led to the adoption of these practices by other countries such as the British South Africa Company and the Mozambique Company in 1892 and the surcharged Uganda typewritten stamps in 1895.

The Imperial British East Africa Company set up post offices at Mombasa and Lamu in May 1890. The first stamps issued, on 23 May 1890, were surcharges on British postage stamps with values of ½, 1 and 4 annas and 'BRITISH EAST AFRICA COMPANY'.

During an acute shortage of stamps in August and September, 1890 stamps of India were used and are known postmarked 'MOMBASA' or 'LAMU'. It is alleged that an agent of stamp dealer Whitfield King bought up all the stocks in the post offices.

The British East Africa Company issued stamps, on 14 October 1890, using a symbolic sun and crown design and inscribed 'IMPERIAL BRITISH EAST AFRICA COMPANY', all valued in annas and rupees.

Shortages, of some values, between 1891 and 1895 resulted in a variety of surcharges being produced.

== British administration ==
On 9 July 1895 stamps of Imperial British East Africa Company were overprinted reading 'BRITISH / EAST / AFRICA' and overprints of 'British / East / Africa' on stamps of India were also issued. The protectorate joined the Universal Postal Union at this time.

In 1896 a series of stamps depicting Queen Victoria was issued, inscribed 'BRITISH EAST AFRICA', these ran short in 1897 and stamps of Zanzibar were overprinted as the stamps of India had been previously. A number of additional post offices were opened along the Uganda Railway, which was started in 1896 at Mombasa and reached Kisumu on Lake Victoria in 1902.

In 1901 the postal administration was merged with that of Uganda, and in 1904 stamps issued for the combined East Africa and Uganda Protectorates came into use.

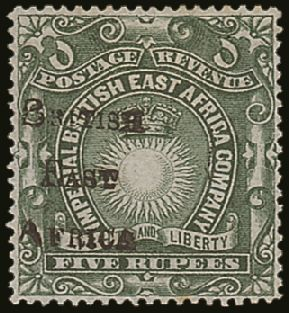
1895 overprint on stamp of Imperial British East Africa Company

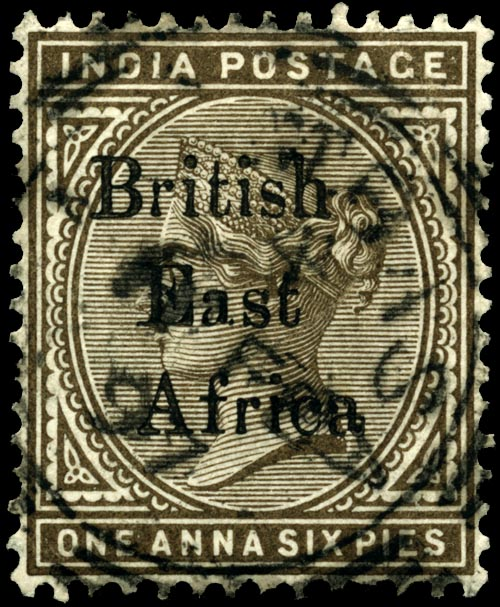
1895 overprint on Indian stamp

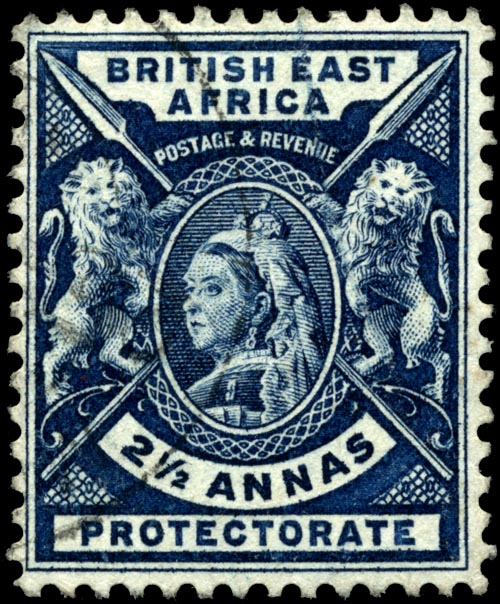
2½ annas stamp, 1896

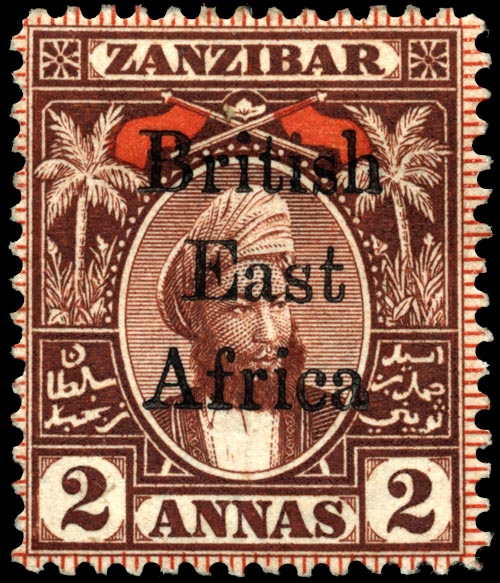
Zanzibar overprint, 1897

== Postal stationery ==
Imperial British East Africa Company Administration
All postal stationery items were inscribed 'IMPERIAL BRITISH EAST AFRICA COMPANY'. Two different sizes of registration envelopes were issued in 1891; produced by Bradbury, Wilkinson & Co. Three different sizes of pre paid 2½ annas envelopes were issued in 1893. Two postcards were made available in 1893; ½ anna and 1 anna.

British administration

British East Africa 1 anna newspaper wrapper postmarked LAMU 26 Feb 1897, used locally

In 1895 one of the sizes of Imperial British East Africa Company envelopes was overprinted 'BRITISH EAST AFRICA'. In 1896 Two different envelopes were produced by overprinting envelopes from India with 'British East Africa'; 2½ annas on 4½ annas envelope and 2 annas 6 pies. Also in 1896 2½ annas envelopes were printed by De la Rue and inscribed 'BRITISH EAST AFRICA PROTECTORATE'.

In 1895 Imperial British East Africa Company registration envelopes was overprinted 'BRITISH EAST AFRICA'. These were followed by 2 annas registration envelopes, in two different sizes, from India being overprinted 'British East Africa'. Finally, two sizes of registration envelopes, printed by De la Rue, were made available.

Four different newspaper wrappers were issued during 1896. Two were produced by overprinting Indian ½ anna and 1 anna wrappers with 'British East Africa' and two, ½ anna and 1 anna, were printed by De la Rue.

A total of eight different postcards were produced with a face value of ½ anna or 1 anna. Two were by overprinting Imperial British East Africa Company postcards, two were by overprinting Indian postcards and the remaining ones were printed by De la Rue.

== See also ==
- Postage stamps and postal history of East Africa and Uganda Protectorates
- Postage stamps and postal history of Kenya, Uganda, Tanganyika
- Postage stamps and postal history of Kenya
- Postage stamps and postal history of Uganda
- Postage stamps and postal history of Zanzibar
- Revenue stamps of Kenya

== References and sources ==
Notes

Sources

- Rossiter, Stuart & John Flower. The Stamp Atlas. London: Macdonald, 1986. ISBN 0-356-10862-7
- Stanley Gibbons catalogues.
