= Postage stamps and postal history of German East Africa =

This is a survey of the postage stamps and postal history of German East Africa.

German East Africa was a German colony in East Africa, including what is now Burundi, Rwanda and Tanganyika (the mainland part of present Tanzania). It came into existence during the 1880s and ended during World War I, when the area was taken over by the British and Belgians, and later as League of Nations mandate territories.

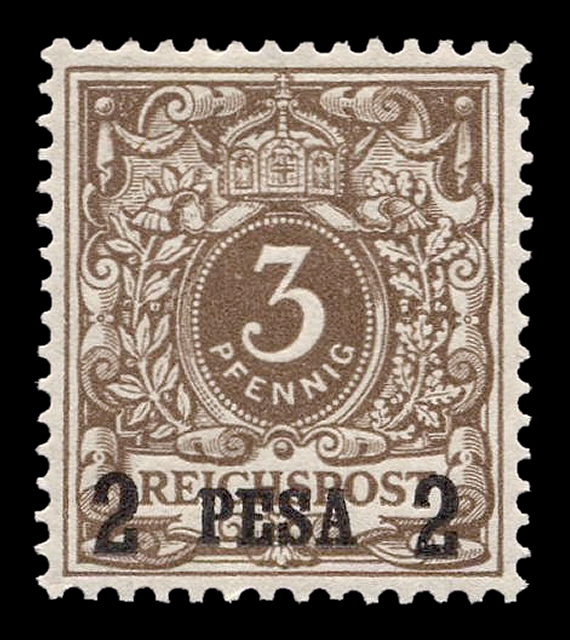
German stamp surcharged in pesa for use in German East Africa, 1893

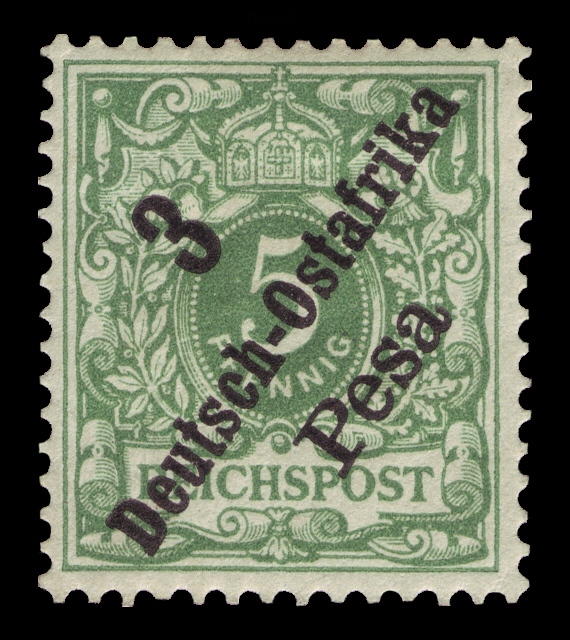
German stamp overprinted "Deutsch-Ostafrika" and surcharged in pesa, 1896

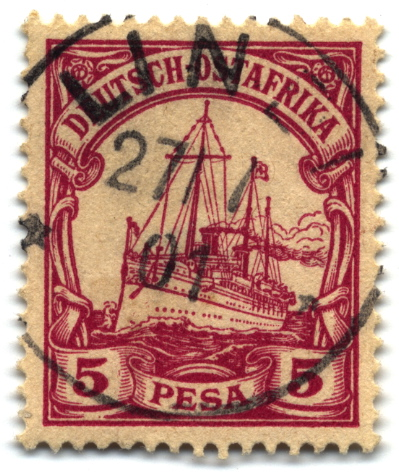
5-pesa "Yacht", postmarked Lindi, 27 July 1901

== German postal agency ==
A German postal agency was established on 27 February 1885 in Lamu using German stamps for mail. Following the Heligoland–Zanzibar Treaty in 1890 Germany created the colony of German East Africa. Initially German stamps were used. The first postage stamps for German East Africa were German stamps surcharged in pesa values in 1893, followed by stamps overprinted "Deutsch-Ostafrika" in 1896. In 1900, Germany issued the "Yachts," a common design used for all of Germany's colonies, featuring the Kaiser's yacht Hohenzollern. In German East Africa they were denominated in pesas and rupees (64 pesas to a rupee), and inscribed "DEUTSCH-OSTAFRIKA". In 1905 new stamps were denominated in "hellers," 100 hellers to a rupee. Germany continued to print stamps during the war, issuing a 1-rupee watermarked Yacht in 1916 (genuine uses of this stamp are extremely rare, worth US$20,000 or more).

== Occupation ==
After the colony was occupied by Belgian and British troops, each issued its own provisional stamps. In 1916, the Belgians overprinted stamps of Belgian Congo in several ways, first with "RUANDA" and "URUNDI," although these were never actually used. A second series was overprinted with the dual-language "EST AFRICAIN ALLEMAND / OCCUPATION BELGE / DUITSCH OOST AFRIKA / BELGISCHE BEZETTING." In 1922 these stamps received surcharges ranging from 5c to 50c.

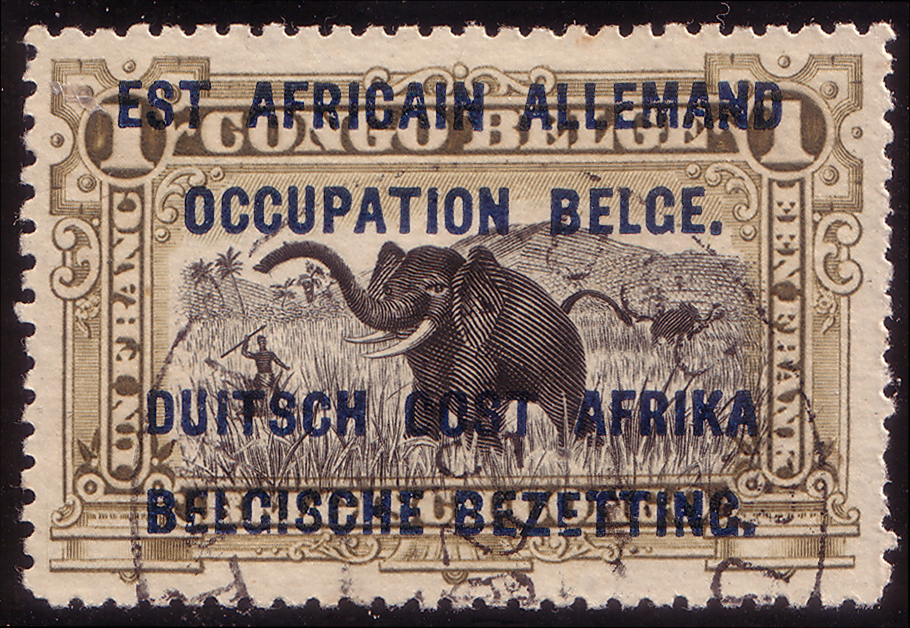
Stamp overprinted for the Belgian Occupied German East Africa Territories, 1916

In 1916, at the request of Brigadier General Edward Northey, to the Governor of Nyasaland, Nyasaland stamps were overprinted "N.F.". The overprint was intended to be "N.F.F.", for "Nyasaland Field Force", but the telegraph operator omitted one “F.” when sending the request to the Governor. The stamps could only be used by troops of the Nyasaland Rhodesian Field Force. Although they were primarily intended for use in German East Africa, they were also used from field post offices in Nyasaland and Mozambique. They were not issued to any civilian post office nor could they be used by any civilians.

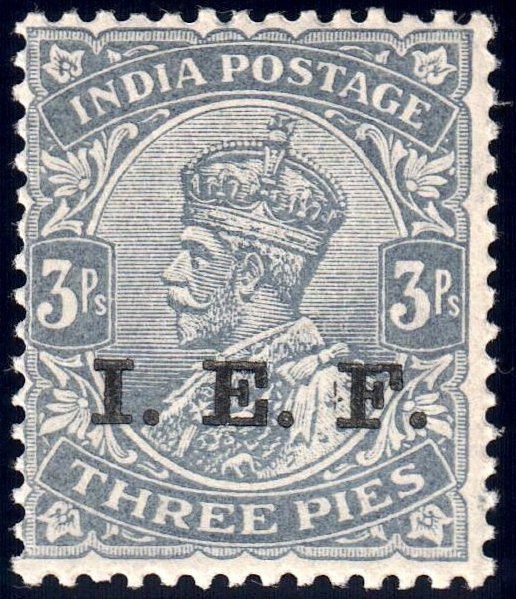
British India stamp overprinted ' I.E.F.' (Indian Expeditionary Force)

The civilian population were able to send mail through the Indian Army postal service field post offices using Indian Expeditionary Forces stamps (Indian stamps overprinted "I.E.F."). When civilian post offices were opened in 1917, stamps of East Africa and Uganda Protectorates were issued overprinted with "G.E.A.". The same overprint on stamps of East Africa and Uganda Protectorates issued in 1921 after the establishment of Tanganyika are considered part of Tanganyika's postal history.

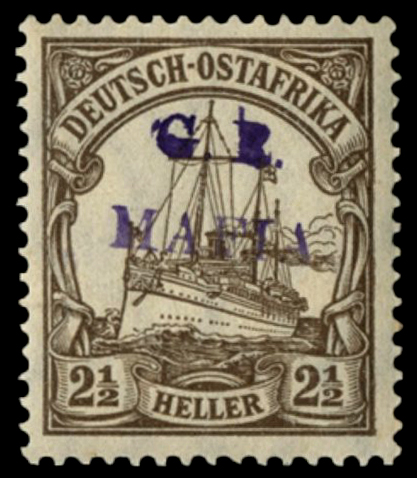
Stamp of German East Africa overprinted for Mafia Island by British occupation forces, 1915

=== Mafia Island ===
On January 12, 1915, Mafia was taken by British troops as a base for the air and sea assault on the light cruiser Königsberg. Stamps were issued by the British occupation forces on the island of Mafia in 1915 and 1916.

== See also ==
- Postage stamps and postal history of the German colonies
- Postage stamps and postal history of Ruanda-Urundi
- Postage stamps and postal history of Rwanda
- Postage stamps and postal history of Burundi
- Postage stamps and postal history of Tanganyika
- Postage stamps and postal history of Tanzania
- Postage stamps and postal history of Kionga
