= Postage stamps and postal history of Zanzibar =

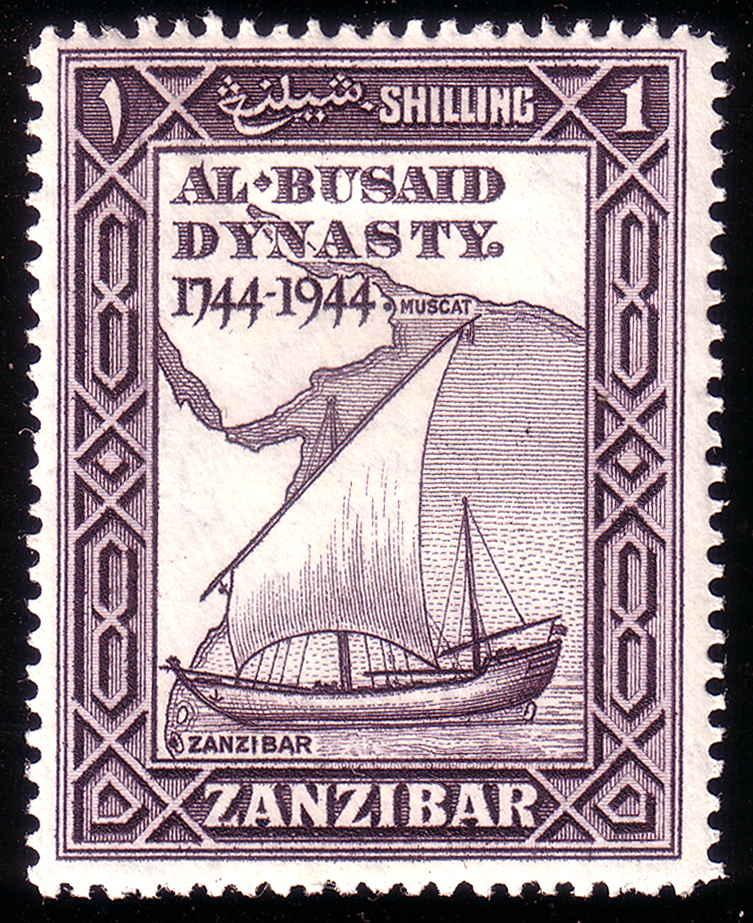
A 1944 stamp of Zanzibar

This is a survey of the postage stamps and postal history of Zanzibar.

Zanzibar is a semi-autonomous part of the United Republic of Tanzania, in East Africa. It comprises most of the Zanzibar Archipelago in the Indian Ocean.

The islands were once governed by the Zanzibar Sultanate, a sovereign state with a long trading history within the Arab world. In 1964 it united with Tanganyika to form Tanzania.

== First stamps ==
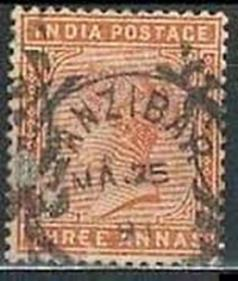
Indian stamp used in Zanzibar

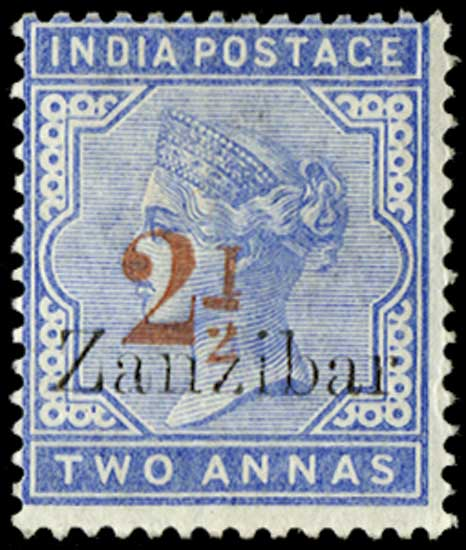
Indian stamps overprinted "Zanzibar"

This item is from a pre-printed Indian envelope or postcard, overprinted.

Before dedicated Zanzibar stamps could be manufactured, Indian stamps were sometimes locally overprinted, at the offices of the Zanzibar Gazette, which had the only printing press in the territory. Any Indian stamps or covers used in Zanzibar between 1854 and 1876 are rare. A post office under Indian administration provided postal services from late 1868 through early 1869. This was re-opened October 1, 1875, as a foreign post office having special relations with the Indian Post Office, and the use of Indian stamps was required.

By treaty in 1862, Great Britain, France and Germany had agreed to respect the independence of Zanzibar. However, in 1890 the Sultanate, including Pemba and a ten-mile wide strip of land along the coast, placed itself under the protection of Great Britain. On November 10, 1895 the post office was transferred to British East African administration. Indian stamps overprinted "Zanzibar" were issued in 1895.

In addition to the Zanzibar post office, there were six other post offices on Zanzibar and three offices on Pemba. A French post office operated from January 16, 1889, to July 31, 1904, and a German postal agency operated from August 27, 1890, to July 31, 1891.

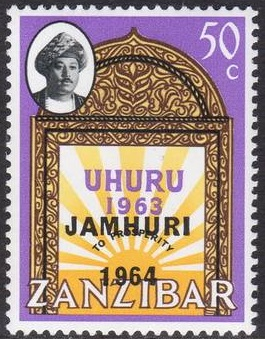
Stamp overprinted "JAMHURI" in 1964

== Later issues ==
The first set of definitives was issued in 1896 depicting the Sultan. Zanzibar issued stamps as a British protectorate until regaining independence in 1963. When the sultanate was overthrown and a republic established in 1964, stamps were overprinted "JAMHURI" (Swahili for 'republic').

After Zanzibar joined Tanganyika to form Tanzania, stamps were issued until 1967.

== See also ==
- French post offices in Zanzibar
- German post offices abroad
- Postage stamps and postal history of British East Africa
- Postage stamps and postal history of German East Africa
- Postage stamps and postal history of Tanzania
- Revenue stamps of Zanzibar
