= Postage stamps and postal history of Kenya =

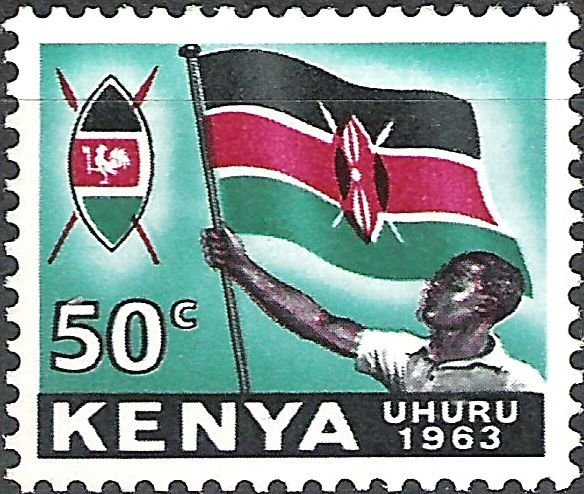
Stamp of Kenya depicting the national flag and ensignia

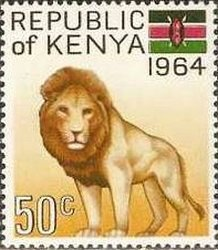
Stamp commemorating the founding of the Republic of Kenya

This is a survey of the postage stamps and postal history of Kenya.

== British colonial issues ==
Kenya used stamps of British East Africa Company (1890–1895), British East Africa (1895–1903), East Africa and Uganda Protectorates (1903–1922), Kenya and Uganda (1922–1935) and Kenya, Uganda and Tanganyika/Tanzania (1935–1976).

== Independence ==
The first stamps of independent Kenya were issued on 12 December 1963. The stamps of Kenya were also valid in Uganda and Tanzania until 1976.

== See also ==
- Postage stamps and postal history of British East Africa
- Postage stamps and postal history of East Africa and Uganda Protectorates
- Postage stamps and postal history of Kenya, Uganda, Tanganyika
- Postage stamps and postal history of Tanzania
- Postage stamps and postal history of Uganda
- Revenue stamps of Kenya
- Kenya Posts and Telecommunications Corporation
- Postal Corporation of Kenya
