= Posta Uganda =

- Type: Parastatal
- Industry: Postal Services
- Founded: 1951
- Headquarters: Kampala Road; Kampala, Uganda
- Key people: James Arinitwe; Managing Director
- Website: Homepage

Posta Uganda (Luganda for Uganda Post) originally named Uganda Post Limited, is the company solely responsible for postal service in Uganda.

== Overview ==
Working through over 300 Post Offices, with active mail boxes that exceed 70,000, with locations in over 30 major cities and towns in the country, Posta Uganda offers a host of auxiliary services, including the following:

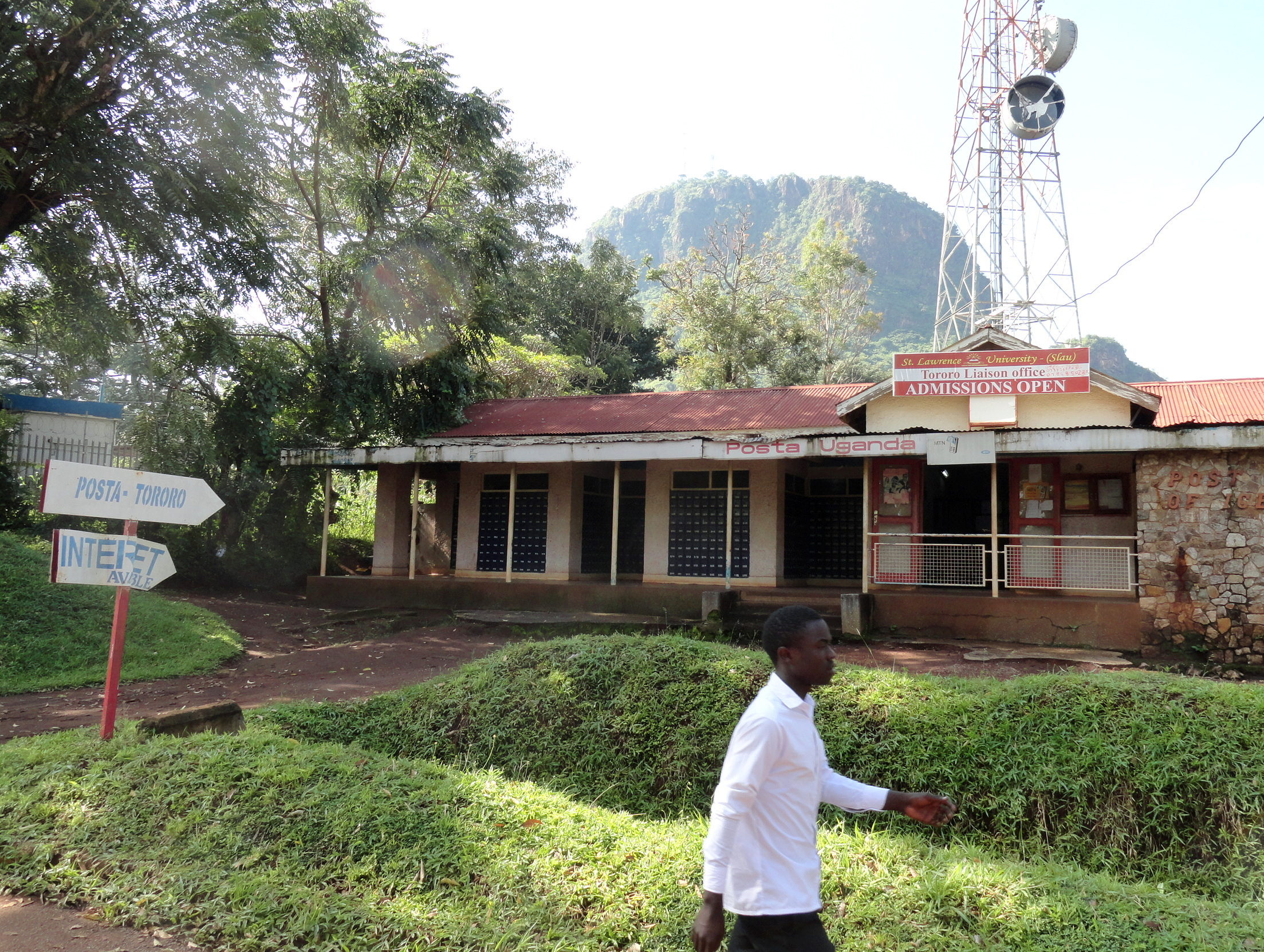
Tororo Post Office with Tororo Rock in background

- Conveyance of letters and parcels
- Express courier services
- Local and International money transfers
- Internet Services
- Public bus transportation via Post Bus Services Limited
- Distribution of magazines and newspapers
- Acting as agent for telecommunications providers.

== History ==
Uganda Post Limited was founded as part of the East African Community. The East African Post and Telecommunications Act in 1951 organized the postal system according to an agreement between the Kenya Colony, the Uganda Protectorate, and the Tanganyika Territory. The 1977 dissolution of the East African Community voided the East African Post and Telecommunications Act. The East African Post and Telecommunications Corporation (EAPTC) was replaced by the Uganda Posts and Telecommunication Corporation (UPTC), although this was not legalized by the parliament of Uganda until 1983.

In 1998, as part of an ongoing government effort to loosen controls over Uganda's communication sector, the UPTC was split into the following independent companies:

- Posta Uganda Limited
- Uganda Telecom Limited
- Post Bank Uganda Limited
- Uganda Communications Commission, the industry sector regulator.

Uganda Post Limited was given control over the postal service and the 1997 Communications Act split Uganda Post Limited into a million shares, each valued at USh 25,000/=. The Ministry of Finance owns an overwhelming majority with 999,999 shares, with the one remaining share owned by the Ministry of Works, Housing, and Urban Development. Although Uganda Post Limited has changed its name to Posta Uganda, the postal service has not been privatized.

== Powers ==
Posta Uganda can grant licenses for franking machines. Posta Uganda has a monopoly of all international and domestic mail in Uganda, although letters may be exempted. Posta Uganda also sets the price for stamps and mail services, although it is limited in this respect by the Communications Act and by the Uganda Communications Commission. In September 2012, Posta Uganda announced a new partnership with Gaming International, in its national and International money transfer service.

== See also ==
- Communications in Uganda
- Postage stamps and postal history of Uganda
