= Postage stamps and postal history of Burundi =

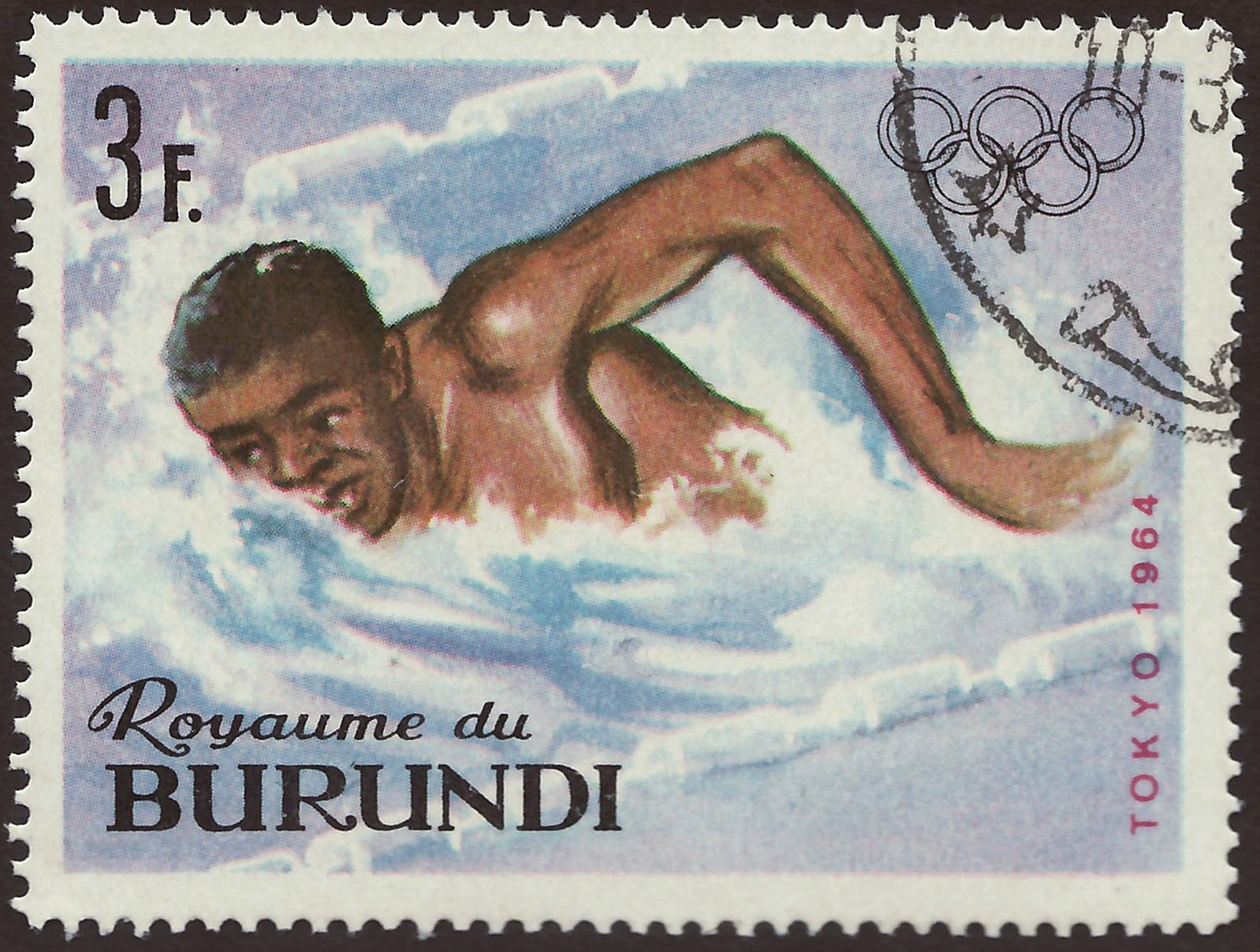
1964 Burundi stamp commemorating the 1964 Summer Olympics

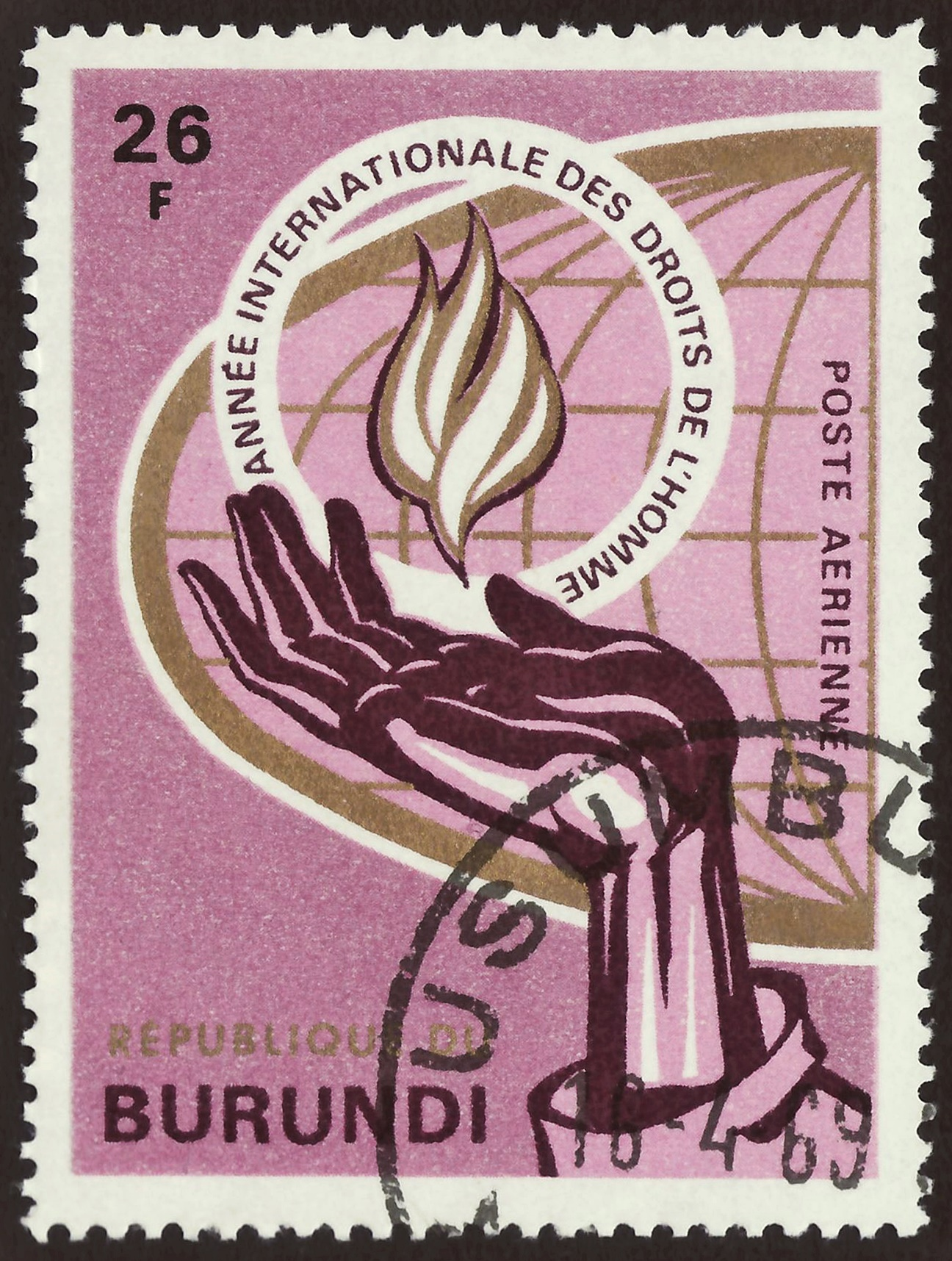
1969 Burundi stamp marking the International Year of Human Rights

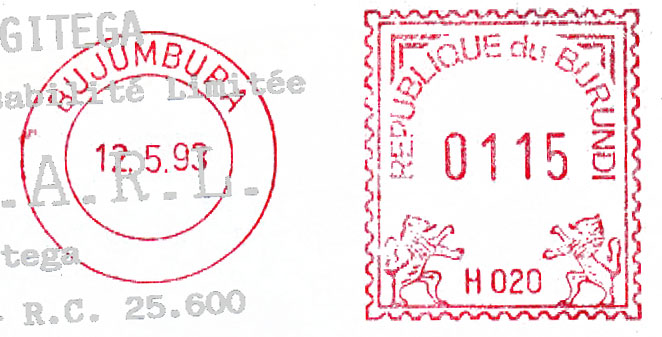
A Burundian meter stamp

Burundi has issued postage stamps for national use since achieving independence on 1 July 1962. The country was formerly a part of the Belgian territory of Ruanda-Urundi and before 1962 used those postage stamps.

== Independence ==
For the first issue after independence as the Kingdom of Burundi, Burundi overprinted stamps of Ruanda-Urundi with "Royaume du Burundi". Subsequent stamps were inscribed "Royaume du Burundi". In February 1963 the government issued a series of stamps bearing assassinated prime minister Louis Rwagasore's visage. The proceeds from the sales of these stamps were used to fund the constructed of Rwagasore's mausoleum and the Prince Louis Rwagasore Stadium. Two more postage series featuring Rwagasore were later released; one in 1966 pairing his image with that of assassinated United States President John F. Kennedy, and another in 1972 celebrating the 10th anniversary of Burundian independence.

== Republic of Burundi ==
In 1966, following political turmoil, Burundi became a republic and from then the stamps were marked "République du Burundi".

== See also ==
- Postage stamps and postal history of German East Africa
- Postage stamps and postal history of Ruanda-Urundi
- Postage stamps and postal history of Rwanda

== Works cited ==
- Deslaurier, Christine (2013). "Rwagasore for ever? Des usages contemporains d'un héros consensuel au Burundi" [Rwagasore for ever? Contemporary uses of a consensual hero in Burundi]. Vingtième Siècle Revue d'histoire (in French). Vol. 2, no. 118. pp. 15–30.
