= Uganda Cowries =

First Ugandan postage stamps

Uganda Missionaries
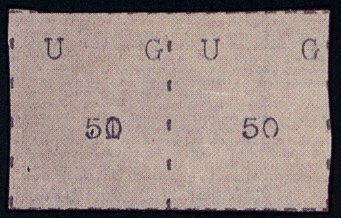
- A pair of Uganda Missionaries showing a typed-over correction by Millar
- Country of production: British Protectorate of Uganda
- Location of production: Kampala, Kingdom of Buganda
- Date of production: March 14, 1895
- Nature of rarity: Very rare
- No. in existence: Unknown
- Face value: 50 cowries
- Estimated value: $3347.60

The Uganda Cowries, also known as the Uganda Missionaries, were the first adhesive postage stamps of Uganda. Because there was no printing press in Uganda, the stamps were made on a typewriter by the Rev. E. Millar of the Church Missionary Society, in March 1895, at the request of C. Wilson, an official of the Imperial British East Africa Company. After Millar received a much-needed new ribbon, the color of the typewritten characters changed from black to a violet color. The stamps were valid for postage within the Kingdom of Buganda; in adjoining kingdoms and provinces they were used only for communications between officials of the Church Missionary Society.

The values of the stamps varied, but all were denominated in cowries (monetary seashells), at 200 cowries per rupee or 12½ cowries = 1d. The design was simple, showing just the initials of the jurisdiction and a number for the denomination. The paper used was extremely thin. The stamps have been forged Only a small number of the genuine stamps seem to have survived. Pen initialed, surcharged values exist; of these Robson Lowe commented, "All are rare. We do not recall selling a copy in over 25 years."

Wilson's embryonic postal system for Uganda commenced operations on March 20, 1895. A single letterbox was set up in Kampala, at Wilson's office, offering twice-daily letter service to Entebbe and Gayaza for postage of 10 cowries. Other destinations had different rates. For addresses beyond Entebbe or Gayaza the mails were collected less frequently. Letters with European addresses were dispatched once a month, and they arrived at their destinations some three months later.

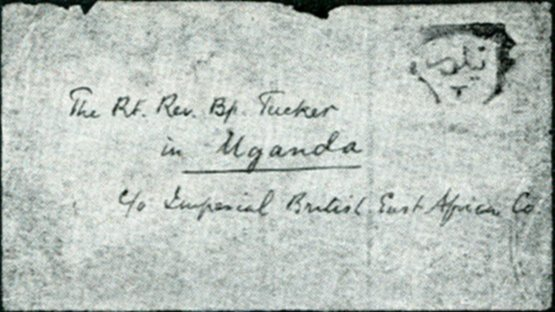
Handstamp of Unyoro on a cover addressed to Bishop Arthur Tucker of the Church Missionary Society

This postal service of Uganda may have been preceded by a postal service of the Kingdom of Unyoro (Bunyoro), which applied a handstamp in Arabic script.

Military Forces assumed the operation of the mails in June 1896. The Uganda Missionaries were then followed by a typeset issue from a printing press in November 1896, after the British Foreign Office had gained control of the government. A recess printed issue from De La Rue & Co. appeared in 1898, featuring a detail from Angeli's portrait of Queen Victoria of 1885.

== See also ==
- List of notable postage stamps
- Postage stamps and postal history of Uganda

== References and sources ==
Sources

- Charles J. Phillips, "Postage Stamps of Uganda", Stanley Gibbons Monthly Journal (February-March, 1904), pp. 164–5; Philatelic Journal of India pp. 4, 6. Re-issued as "The Missionary Issues of Uganda, March 20, 1895 - November 7, 1896", Stanley Gibbons (1904).
- Robson Lowe, "The Uganda Missionaries", a supplement to The Philatelist (August, 1974); Robson Lowe, London (1974).
- Robson Lowe, "2.-Uganda", The Encyclopedia of British Empire Postage Stamps, Volume II: The Empire in Africa, (1949), pp. 185-190.
