= Postage stamps and postal history of Uganda =

A 1965 stamp of Uganda

This is a survey of the postage stamps and postal history of Uganda.

Uganda is a landlocked country in East Africa. It is bordered on the east by Kenya, on the north by South Sudan, on the west by the Democratic Republic of the Congo, on the southwest by Rwanda, and on the south by Tanzania. The southern part of the country includes a substantial portion of Lake Victoria, which is also bordered by Kenya and Tanzania.

== British East Africa Company ==
The first stamps used in Uganda were the 1890 issues of the British East Africa Company.

== Uganda Cowries ==
The Uganda Cowries were mission stamps typewritten by E. Millar in 1895; these stamps are among the most rarest and valuable postage stamps of the world.

== Uganda Protectorate ==
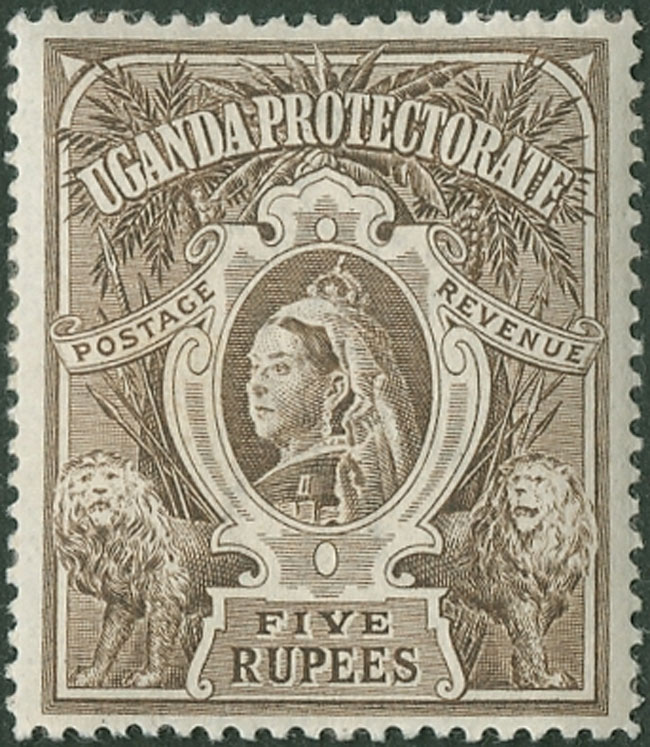
Stamp of Uganda Protectorate, 1898

In 1898 a set of seven stamps portraying Queen Victoria and inscribed Uganda Protectorate was issued.

== Joint postal administrations (1902–1962) ==
Uganda then used stamps of East Africa & Uganda (1903–1922), Kenya & Uganda (1922–1927) and Kenya, Uganda and Tanganyika/Tanzania (1935–1976). Although Uganda had its own postal administration from 1962, commemoratives inscribed Kenya, Uganda and Tanzania remained in use until 1976.

== Self-government (1962) ==
Uganda issued a set of four stamps on 28 July 1962 commemorating the centenary of Speke's discovery of the source of the Nile. This was the only set issued by Uganda as a self-governing state.

== Independent (1962–) ==
The first stamps of independent Uganda were issued on 9 October 1962. Uganda regularly issues both commemorative and definitive stamps. The stamps of Uganda were also valid in Kenya and Tanzania until 1976.

== See also ==
- Postage stamps and postal history of British East Africa
- Postage stamps and postal history of East Africa and Uganda Protectorates
- Postage stamps and postal history of Kenya, Uganda, Tanganyika
- Postage stamps and postal history of Kenya
- Postage stamps and postal history of Tanzania
- Uganda Cowries
- Posta Uganda
