= Postage stamps and postal history of Rwanda =

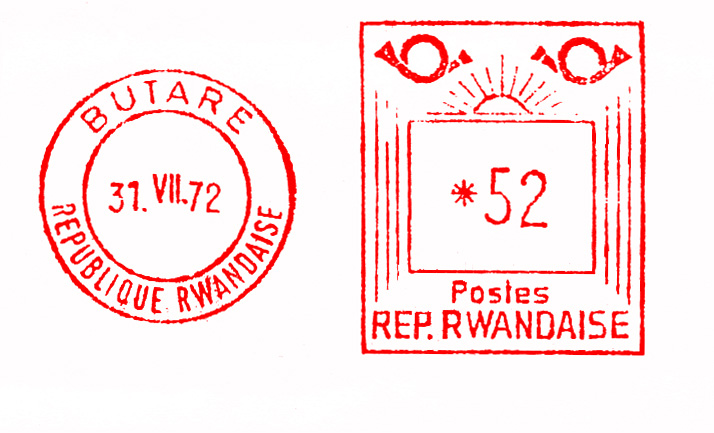
A 1972 meter stamp of Rwanda from Butare

This is a survey of the postage stamps and postal history of Rwanda. The Republic of Rwanda is a landlocked country located in the Great Lakes region of eastern-central Africa, bordered by Uganda, Burundi, the Democratic Republic of the Congo and Tanzania.

== Colonial issues ==
The first stamps used in the area now known as Rwanda were stamps of German East Africa which was the colonial power in the area until 1916 when Belgian troops seized the territory during the First World War. Stamps of Ruanda-Urundi were then used until independence.

== Independence ==
The first stamps of independent Rwanda were issued on 1 July 1962. Rwanda has issued stamps with a regional connection on the one hand, and on the other hand with far more global themes, such as art history, technology, and flora and fauna. Many stamps were designed by well-known (mostly Belgian) graphic artists.

=== Reduction of issues and counterfeiting ===
In the 1990s, Rwanda reduced the number of issues. The country almost stopped issuing postage stamps after 1999 as modern forms of franking emerged. This gap and ignorance of the collecting area by collectors was used by fraudsters to bring imaginary products onto the market which bear the inscription Rwanda but are not stamps and have never been used postally. Motifs include fire engines, cars and football companies, for example.

== See also ==
- Postage stamps and postal history of German East Africa
- Postage stamps and postal history of Ruanda-Urundi
- Postage stamps and postal history of Burundi
