= Postage stamps and postal history of Ruanda-Urundi =

The African territories of Ruanda and Urundi came under Belgian control as Ruanda-Urundi after they were seized from Germany during World War I in 1916. They had previously formed part of German East Africa.

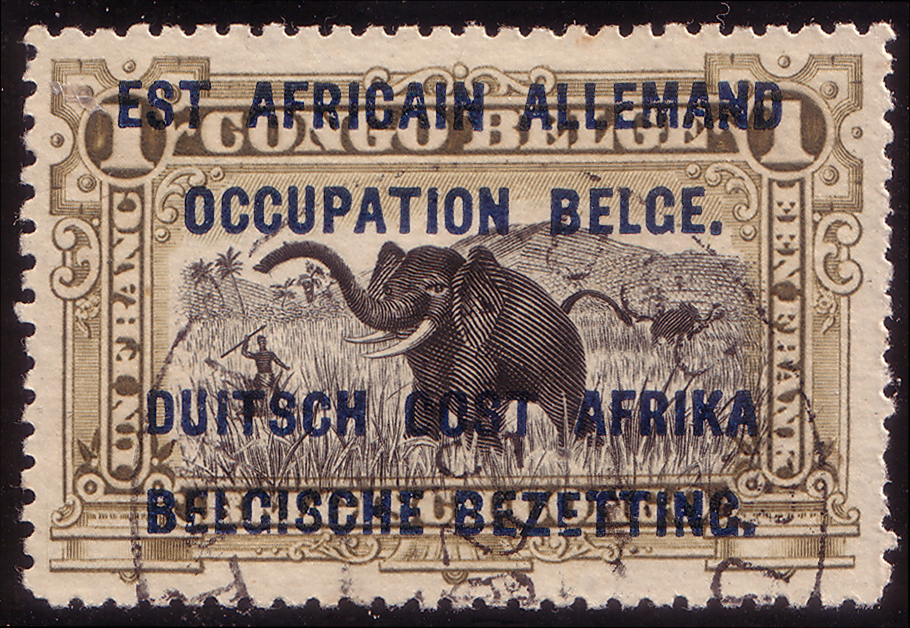
Stamp overprinted for the Belgian Occupied German East Africa Territories, 1916

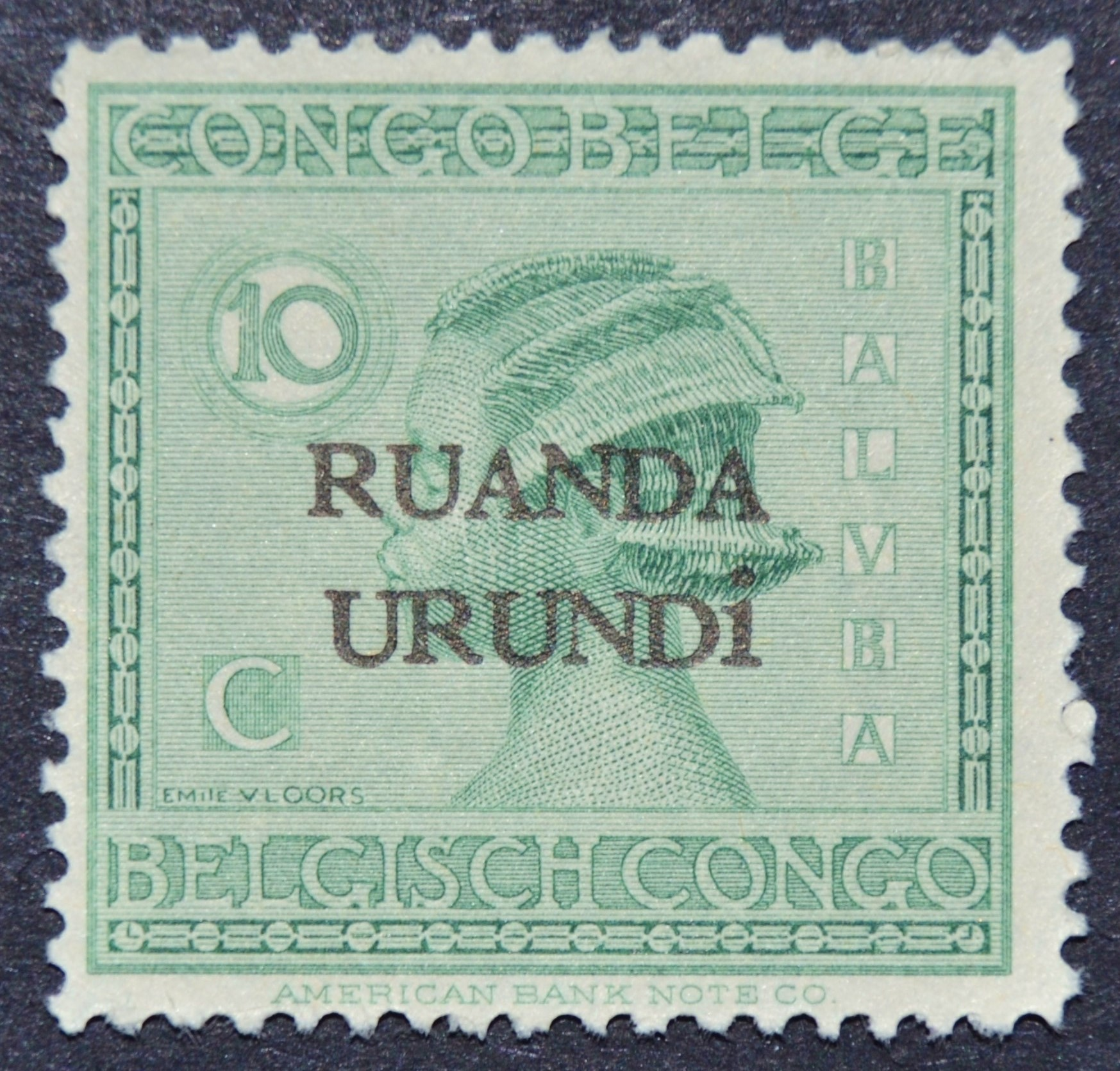
Belgian Congo stamp overprinted "Ruanda Urundi", 1924

The territory was under Belgian military occupation from 1916 to 1922, and stamps of Belgian Congo were overprinted for the occupied territories with bilingual inscriptions "EST AFRICAIN ALLEMAND OCCUPATION BELGE / DUITSCH OOST AFRIKA BELGISCHE BEZETTING" in French and Dutch.

Ruanda-Urundi later became a Belgian-controlled Class B Mandate under the League of Nations from 1922 to 1945. Stamps of Belgian Congo overprinted "Ruanda-Urundi" were issued in 1924. The first series of definitive stamps featuring local themes was issued in 1931.

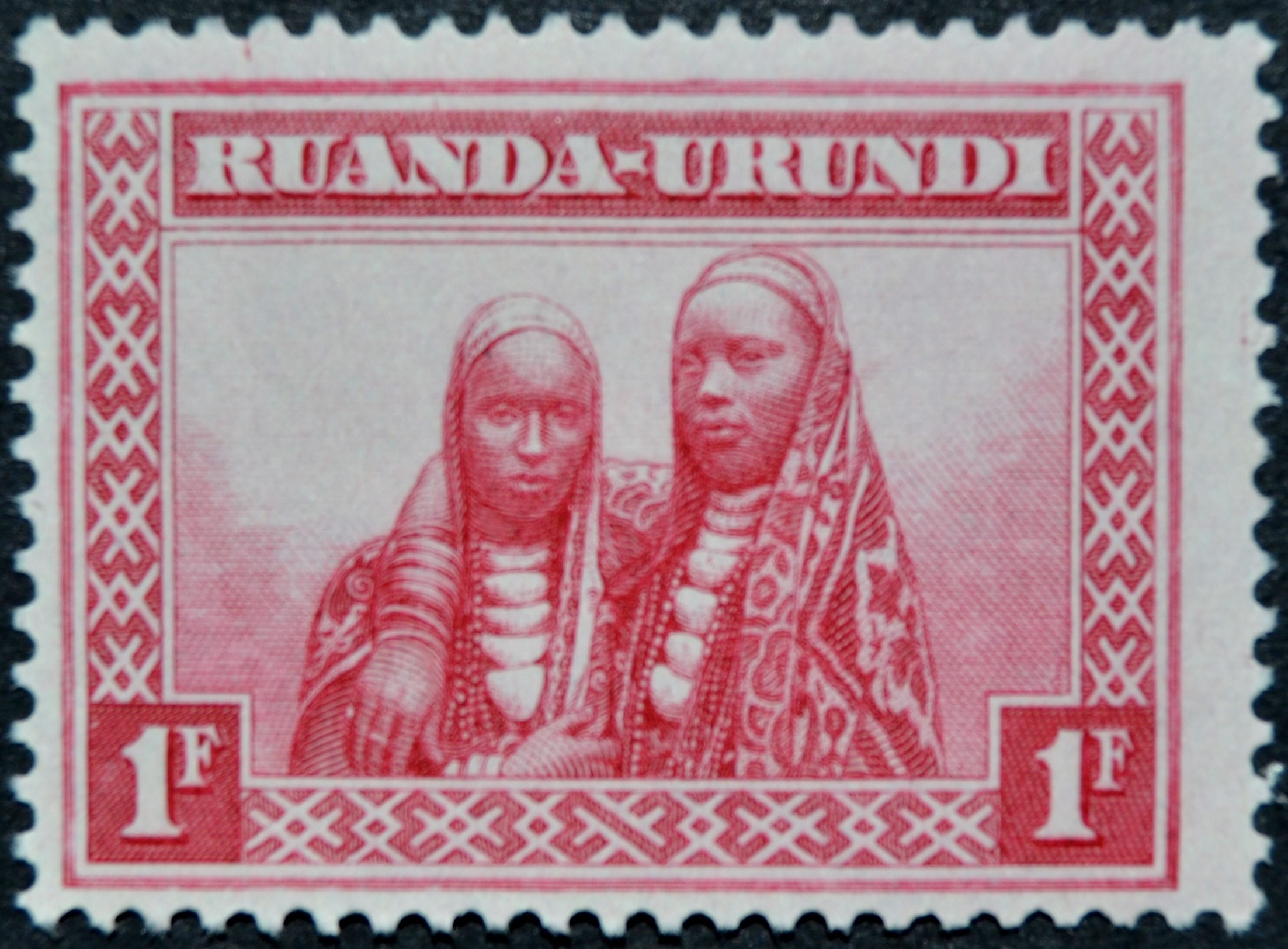
The 1931 series

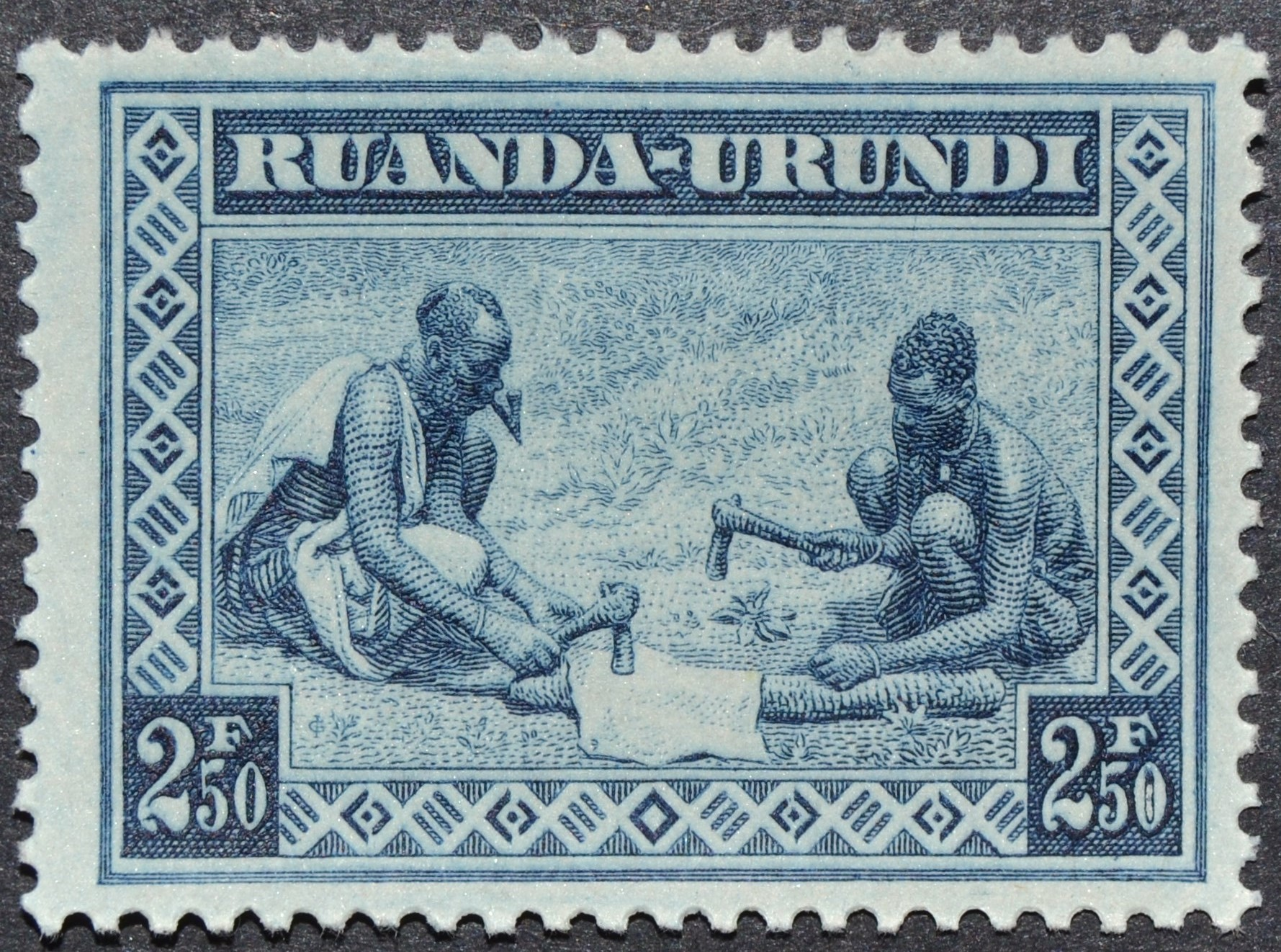
The 1931 series

The territory became a Trust Territory of the United Nations in 1946. Ruanda-Urundi gained independence in 1962 as two separate countries of Rwanda and Burundi.

== See also ==
- Postage stamps and postal history of German East Africa
- Postage stamps and postal history of Rwanda
- Postage stamps and postal history of Burundi
