= Postage stamps and postal history of Tanganyika =

This is a survey of the postage stamps and postal history of Tanganyika under British mandate.

== First stamps ==
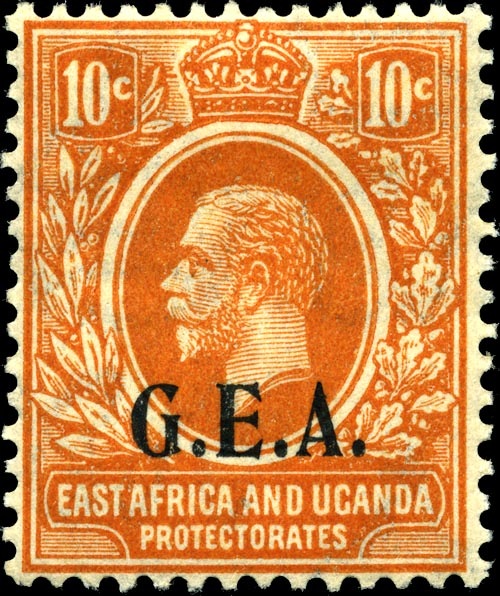
1922 G.E.A. overprinted 10- orange stamp

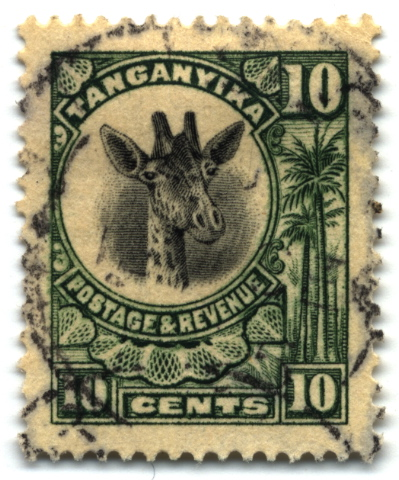
10-cent giraffe, 1925

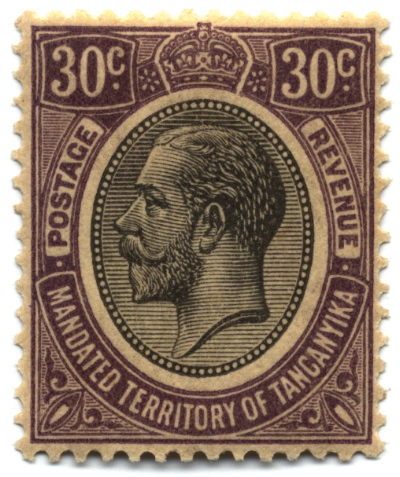
30-cent George V, 1927

The first postage stamps of Tanganyika were stamps of the East Africa and Uganda Protectorates overprinted "G.E.A." (for German East Africa), used in 1921 and 1922. These are superficially identical to the last occupation issues of German East Africa, but the presence of the "Crown and Script CA" watermark shows they were issued after the civil administration took over from the military, and are thus properly considered the first issues of Tanganyika.

== Later issues ==
In 1922, the government issued a series of 19 stamps inscribed "TANGANYIKA", featuring the head of a giraffe, denominated in cents, shillings and pounds (100 cents to a shilling, 20 shillings to a pound), with several colour changes in 1925. The changes were because there were many power changes, with each leader wanting a different color.

This was followed in 1927 by a second series of 16 values in a more conventional design with a profile of King George V and inscribed "MANDATED TERRITORY OF TANGANYIKA".

In 1927, Tanganyika entered the Customs Union of Kenya and Uganda, as well as the East African Postal Union. Between 1935 and 1963, stamps of the combined postal administration (East African Posts and Telecommunications Administration) inscribed "Kenya, Uganda, Tanganyika" were in use.

== Independence ==
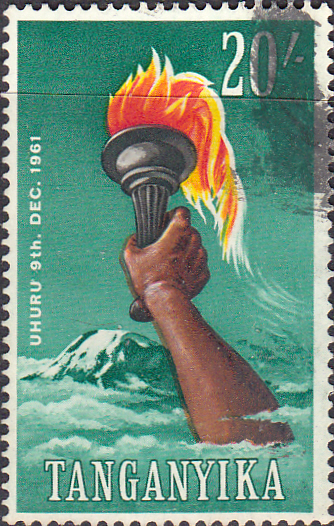
Independence issue, 1961

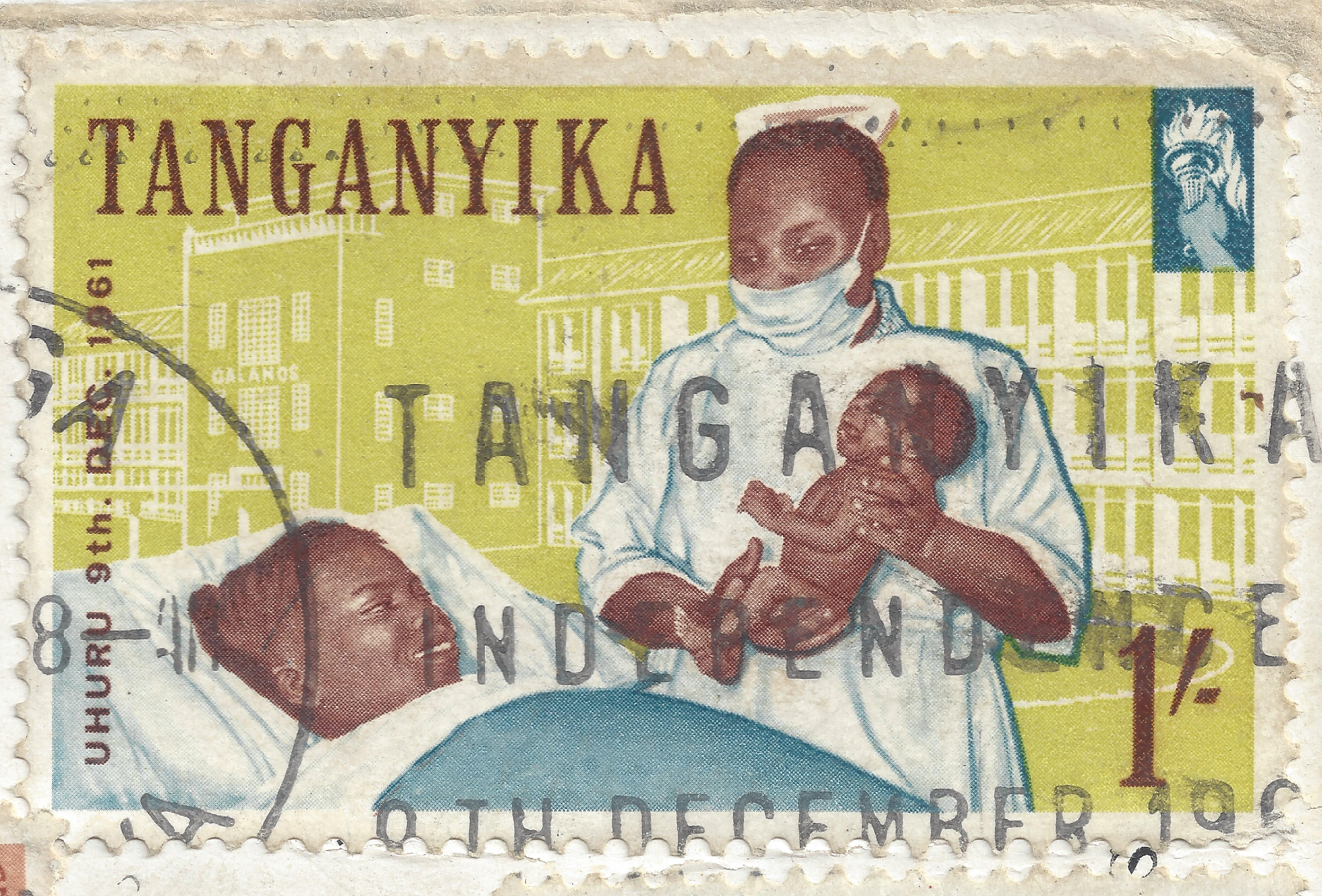
Independence issue, "Maternity", 1961

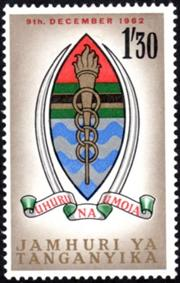
1962 stamp with coat of arms

Shortly after independence in 1961, the new state of Tanganyika issued a series of commemorative stamps inscribed "TANGANYIKA".

This was followed by a final commemorative issue on December 9, 1962, with four stamps inscribed "JAMHURI YA TANGANYIKA" ("Republic of Tanganyika") to commemorate the founding of the republic.

Tanganyika ceased to exist as a nation in 1964, when it was loosely united with Zanzibar, to form the nation of Tanzania. Stamps of the East African postal administration remained valid until well after the formation of Tanzania.

== Sources ==
- Stanley Gibbons Ltd: various catalogues
- Rossiter, Stuart and John Flower. The Stamp Atlas. London: Macdonald, 1986. ISBN 0-356-10862-7
- Encyclopaedia of Postal Authorities
