= Revenue stamps of Zanzibar =

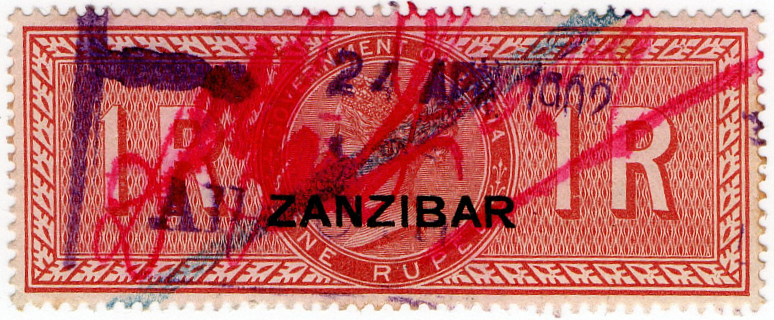
An Indian revenue stamp overprinted for use in Zanzibar.

Zanzibar issued revenue stamps from when it was a British protectorate in 1892, to after when it became part of Tanzania in 1993.

== Revenue (1892-1970) ==
Zanzibar's first revenues were Indian revenue or special adhesive stamps overprinted ZANZIBAR in capitals, and these were issued between May 1892 and August 1894. Various provisional overprints, some manuscript and some printed, were produced at around 1904, and most of these are rare. In 1905, postage stamps portraying Sultan Seyyid Hamoud bin Mahommed bin Said were overprinted "Revenue", and sometime later, 1 rupee surcharges appeared on this issue. Between 1907 and 1908 various postage stamps with the monogram of the Sultan were issued overprinted "Revenue" locally or "REVENUE" by De La Rue in London. From 1908 postage stamps were valid for fiscal use, but in 1936 high values were issued inscribed for use as revenues only. In 1964, one of these was issued handstamped "JAMHURI 1964" in purple, after the Zanzibar Revolution. In 1966, postage stamps handstamped "REVENUE" were issued, and these were replaced by a new issue inscribed Pato in 1970.

== Airport or Seaport Departure (1993) ==
In 1993, two Airport Charge stamps with face values 800/- and US$10 and two Seaport Charge stamps with face values of 300/- and US$5 were issued. The Airport Charge 800/- (and possibly the other value) also exist with a handstamped surcharge 1000/-.

== See also ==
- Postage stamps and postal history of Zanzibar
