= Revenue stamps of Kenya =

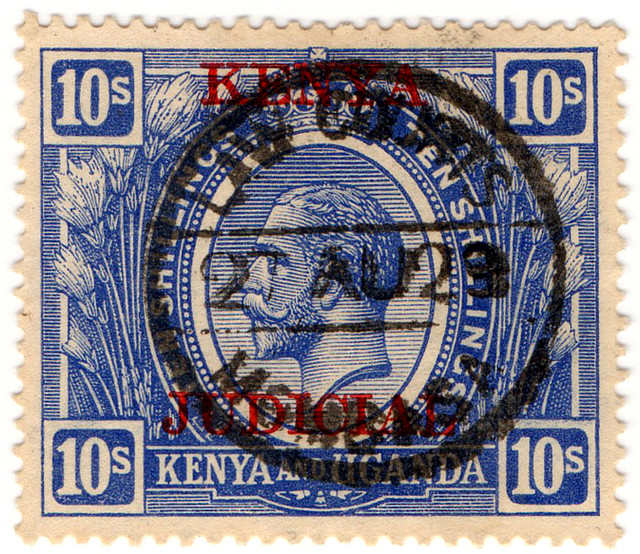
A Kenyan Judicial stamp used at Mombasa in 1929.

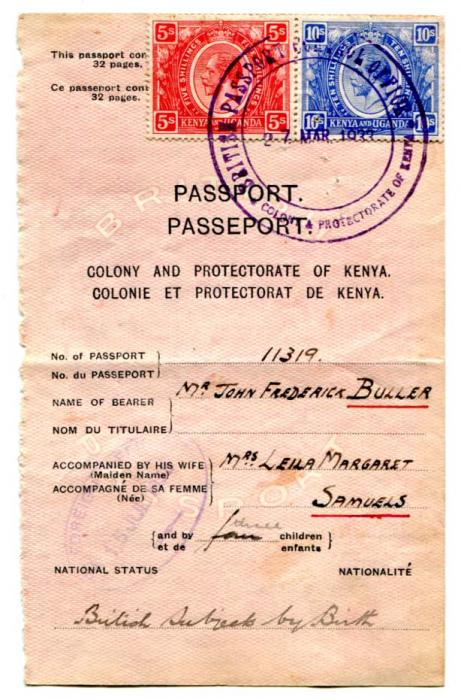
Kenya & Uganda stamps fiscally used on a 1933 passport page.

Kenya, formerly known as British East Africa issued revenue stamps since 1891. There were numerous types of revenue stamps for a variety of taxes and fees. Also valid for fiscal use in Kenya were postage stamps issued by the following entities:

- Imperial British East Africa Company (1890–1895)
- British East Africa Protectorate (1895–1903)
- East Africa and Uganda Protectorates (1903–1922)
- Kenya and Uganda (1922–1935)
- Kenya, Uganda and Tanganyika (1935–1959)

== British East Africa ==
In 1891 and 1892, postage stamps of the Imperial British East Africa Company were handstamped locally INLAND REVENUE for use as general purpose duty stamps. In 1895 and 1896, similar overprints were applied to postage stamps of British East Africa, which were already overprints on stamps of the British East Africa Company or India. Around 1898, stamps portraying Queen Victoria were also issued with this overprint.

In 1897, the Queen Victoria issue was also overprinted CONSULAR SERVICE, and between that year and 1901, various stamps were also overprinted or handstamped JUDICIAL FEE for use in law courts.

Proofs exist for British East Africa impressed duty stamps, but these were probably never issued.

== East Africa and Uganda ==
On 1 April 1903, the postal service of British East Africa joined with that of Uganda, forming a joint postal service with stamps inscribed East Africa and Uganda Protectorates. Between 1903 and 1904, some of these stamps which portrayed the new monarch King Edward VII were handstamped JUDICIAL FEE in violet, either reading up or horizontally. About a year later in 1905, these were replaced by stamps with an overprint in seriffed capitals, and these exist with two different watermarks. Although the inscription on these stamps implied that they were valid in Uganda, the judicial overprints were only valid in the East Africa Protectorate, as Uganda had separate revenue stamps.

In the 1940s and 1950s, proofs were also prepared for cigarette excise stamps inscribed Kenya, Uganda & Tanganyika Excise Duty. However no issued strips are known and they are only known to exist at the Crown Agents archives in the British Library and from the printers' archives.

== Kenya ==
Kenya's first revenues were King George V postage stamps of Kenya & Uganda overprinted KENYA JUDICIAL between 1928 and 1930. There were two types, the first printed locally by an unknown printer, and the second printed in London by De La Rue. Between 1936 and 1959 Kenya issued five stamps for Kodi (Poll Tax). These are large Nyasaland keytypes with the portraits of either King George V, King George VI or Queen Elizabeth II. All of these are rare and command high prices by collectors.

Around 1954, KUT postage stamps portraying Queen Elizabeth II and local scenes were overprinted KENYA REVENUE. These were replaced by a new design showing an African lion in 1956 which remained in use until the late 1970s. All other designs since then featured lions, either as heraldic or naturalistic. In 2011 forgeries to defraud the KRA were found.

Between 1963 and the early 1970s stamps were issued to pay the Graduated Personal Tax, and from 1966 to 2001 stamps were issued annually to pay the Hospital Tax, later known as the National Hospital Insurance Fund. Between 1972 and the 1990s, Kenya issued stamps to pay for airport passenger service fees. These are denominated either in Kenyan shillings for local or in US dollars for international flights, and around 1995, stamps showing Mount Kenya were issued to pay the Services Charge, known locally as Huduma.

Kenya also issues excise stamps for use on wine or spirits, but these are currently being phased out due to the discovery of forgeries to defraud the KRA.

Kenya had impressed duty stamps from 1927 to 1973 and meter stamps from 1973 to 1999.

== See also ==
- Postage stamps and postal history of British East Africa
- Postage stamps and postal history of East Africa and Uganda Protectorates
- Postage stamps and postal history of Kenya
