= Postage stamps and postal history of Tanzania =

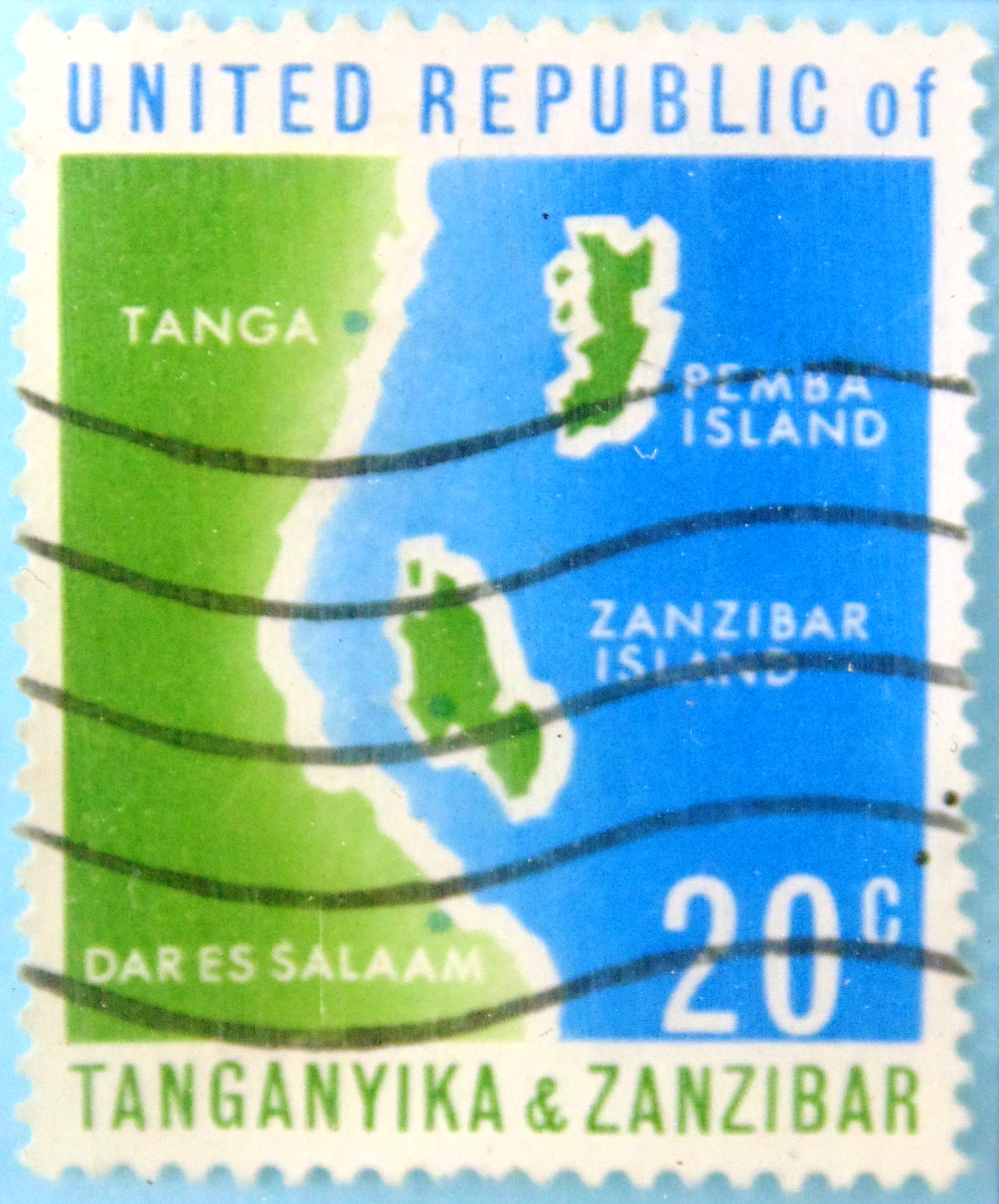
1964 Founding of the union issue

The story of the postage stamps and postal history of Tanzania begins with German East Africa, which was occupied by British forces during World War I. After the war, the territory came under British rule, was named Tanganyika and issued stamps under that name until after a union with Zanzibar in 1964.

== First stamps ==
The first issue of Tanzania proper was a set of four commemorative stamps marking the union, issued 7 July 1964. Inscribed "UNITED REPUBLIC OF TANGANYIKA & ZANZIBAR", two values depict a map of the coast from Tanga to Dar-es-Salaam along with Zanzibar and Pemba, while other two show hands holding a torch and spear.

== Later issues ==
The first definitive series inscribed Tanzania was issued 9 December 1965, and consisted of a set of 14 values ranging from 5 cents to 20 shillings, depicting a variety of scenes, symbols, and wildlife.

The stamps of Tanzania were also valid in Kenya and Uganda (until 1976), and so Tanzania did not typically issue its own commemoratives. A definitives series issued 9 December 1967 featured various fish, and series of 15 stamps from 3 December 1973 depicted butterflies. Four of these values were surcharged 17 November 1975.

In 1976 and 1977, Tanzania issued eight commemorative sets that shared design with the stamps of Kenya, and after that it issued its own designs.

== 85th birthday of the Queen Mother ==
In 1985, Clive Feigenbaum was the organiser of stamps of Tanzania to mark the 85th birthday of H.M. The Queen Mother. The stamps had to be reprinted when it emerged that the original designs were marked "85th Year of H.R.H. The Queen Mother" rather than "85th Birthday of H.M. Queen Elizabeth The Queen Mother". The stamps, printed by Holders Press, were eventually issued in corrected form on 30 September 1985 while the original printing was not issued in Tanzania. The British Crown Agents recommended that the original stamps be destroyed, however, they continue to be available on eBay and through stamp dealers. Holders Press went on to produce a number of further stamp issues for Tanzania.

== Recent stamps ==
Stamp-issuing policy was relatively restrained in the 1980s, with about 7-8 special issues each year, typically of four stamps each, and a definitive series of mammals in 1980, but by the end of the decade the postal administration had begun putting out large numbers of issues aimed solely at stamp collectors, with averages of over 100 types annually. Tanzania is a client of the Inter-Governmental Philatelic Corporation.

== See also ==
- Postage stamps and postal history of German East Africa
- Postage stamps and postal history of Kenya, Uganda, Tanganyika
- Postage stamps and postal history of Tanganyika
- Postage stamps and postal history of Zanzibar

== References and sources ==
Sources

- Encyclopaedia of Postal Authorities
- Rossiter, Stuart & John Flower. The Stamp Atlas. London: Macdonald, 1986. ISBN 0-356-10862-7
