= Postage stamps and postal history of Kenya, Uganda and Tanganyika =

Kenya, Uganda, Tanganyika (KUT) is the name on British postage stamps made for use in the British colonies of Kenya, Uganda, and Tanganyika. The stamps were circulated between 1935 and 1963 by the joint postal service of the three colonies, the East African Posts and Telecommunications Administration, reconstituted as part of the East African High Commission from 1948 to 1961, the East African Common Services Organization from 1961 to 1967, and the East African Community from 1967 to 1977. Even after independence, the new separate nations continued to use the KUT stamps, and they remained valid for postage until 1977.

== First K.U.T. stamps ==
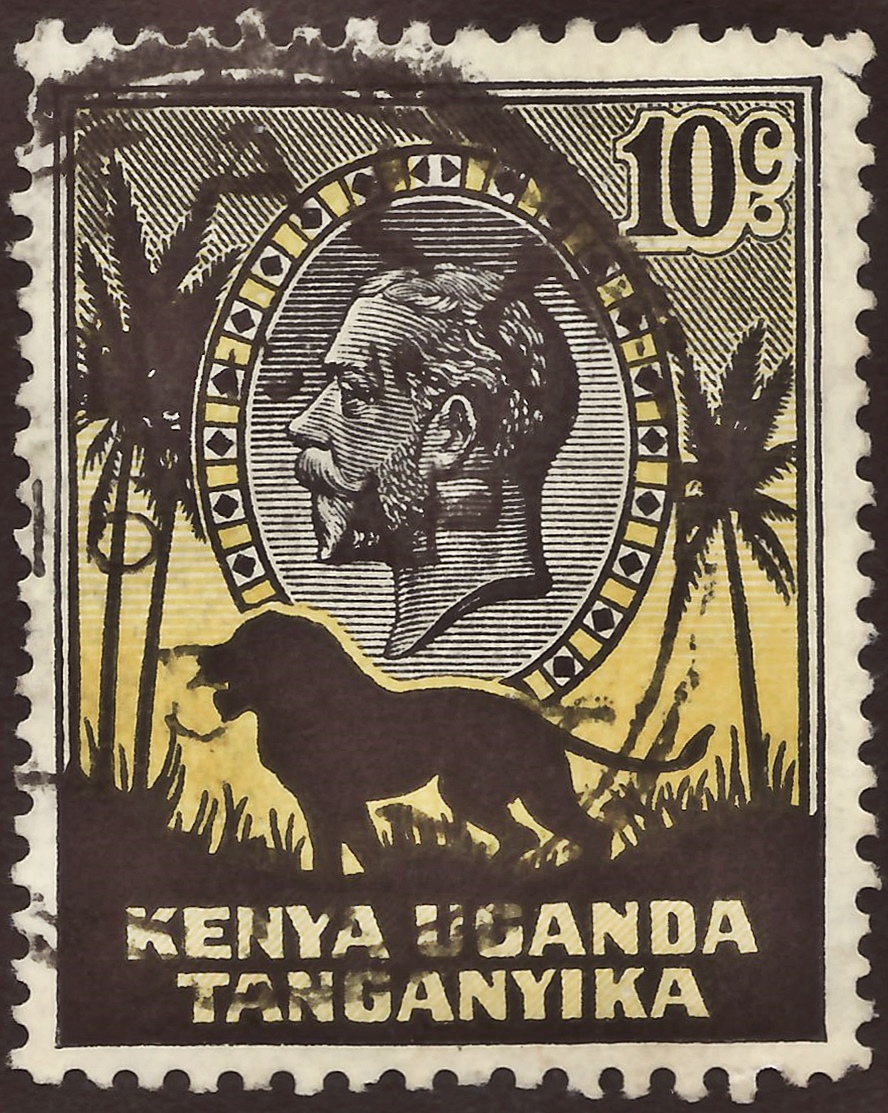
King George V, 1935

The first stamps marked Kenya, Uganda and Tanganyika were issued in 1935, in the form of common design commemoratives for the Silver Jubilee of King George V as well as a definitive series featuring a profile of the king and local scenes. They replaced stamps marked "East Africa and Uganda Protectorates" and "Kenya and Uganda". The definitives included a dramatic departure from the usual engraved stamps of the period; the 10c and £1 stamp were typographed and had a silhouette of a lion, with color combinations of black/yellow and black/red, respectively.

== George VI ==
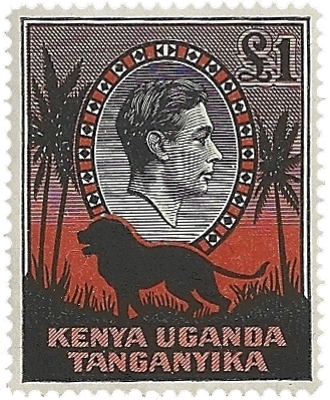
George VI with lion, 1938

The same designs were reissued in 1938 with a profile of George VI. Wartime exigencies forced the use of surcharges on four South African stamps in 1941 and 1942, but after the war the usual common types (Peace Issue, Silver Wedding Issue, etc.) resumed.

== Queen Elizabeth II ==
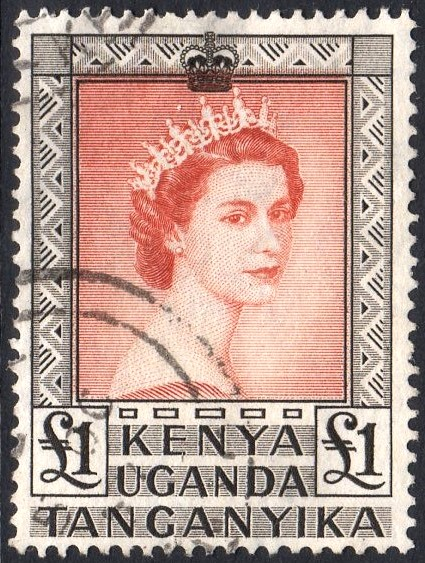
Queen Elizabeth II, 1954

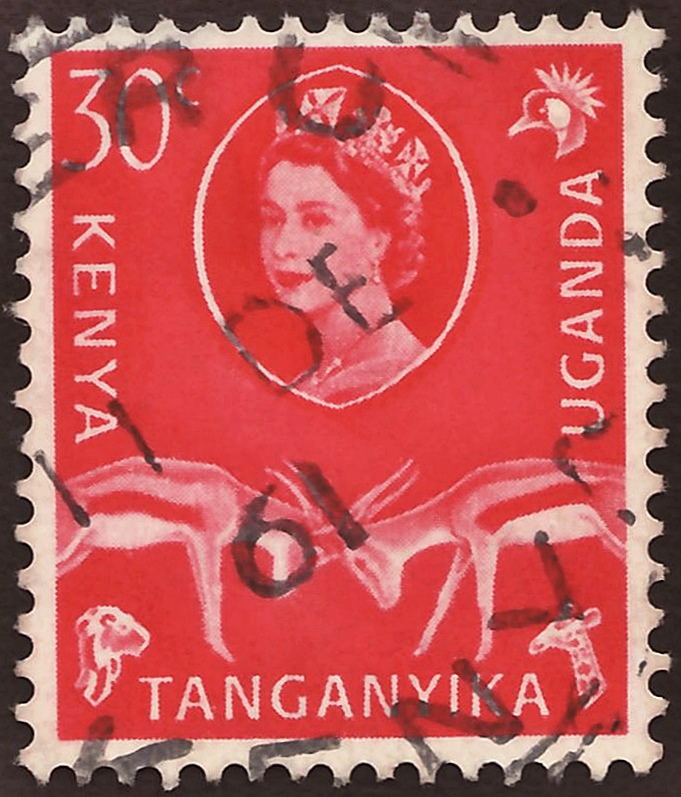
Queen Elizabeth II, 1960

A definitive series, with new designs, was issued in 1954 for Queen Elizabeth, and in 1958 a pair of commemoratives marked the 100th anniversary of the discovery (from a European perspective) of the Great Lakes of Africa by Burton and Speke.

A new definitive series in 1960 used simpler and more symbolic designs, and was followed in 1963 by three sets of commemoratives. At this point postal service was taken over by the East African Common Services Organization, which issued commemoratives for the 1964 Summer Olympics inscribed "Uganda, Kenya, Tanganyika, Zanzibar", even though they were never actually used in Zanzibar. After Tanganyika merged with Zanzibar to form Tanzania, subsequent stamps were inscribed "Uganda, Kenya, Tanzania", with the three names being listed in randomly varying orders.

These stamps were issued in parallel with stamps from each of the newly independent nations. The Common Services Organization continued to issue various commemoratives, at the rate of about 10-12 per year, until early in 1976.

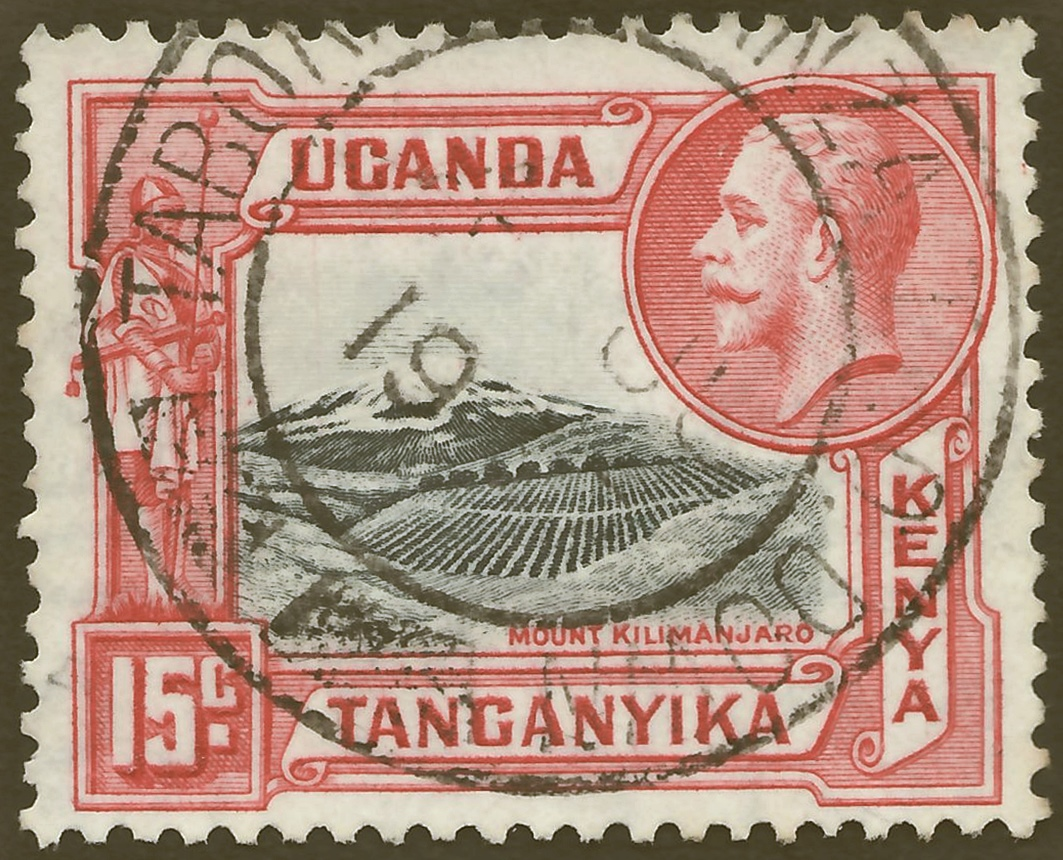

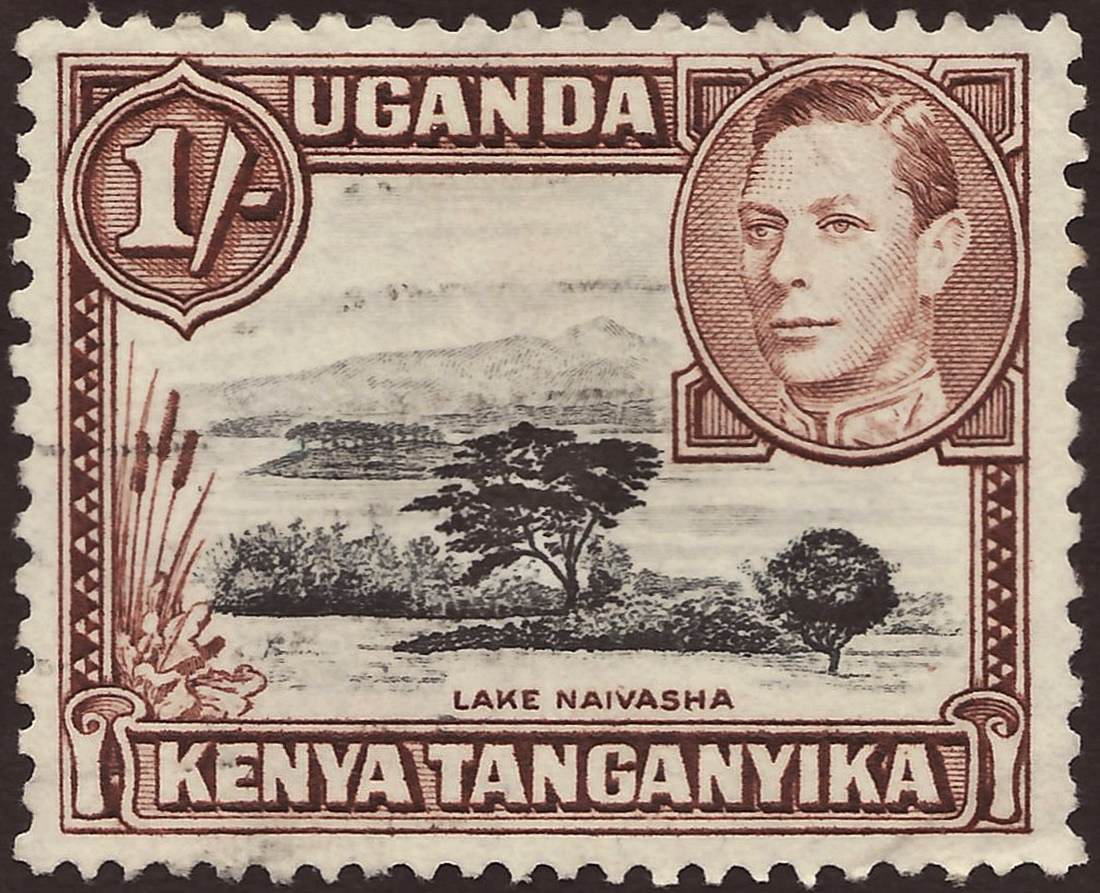

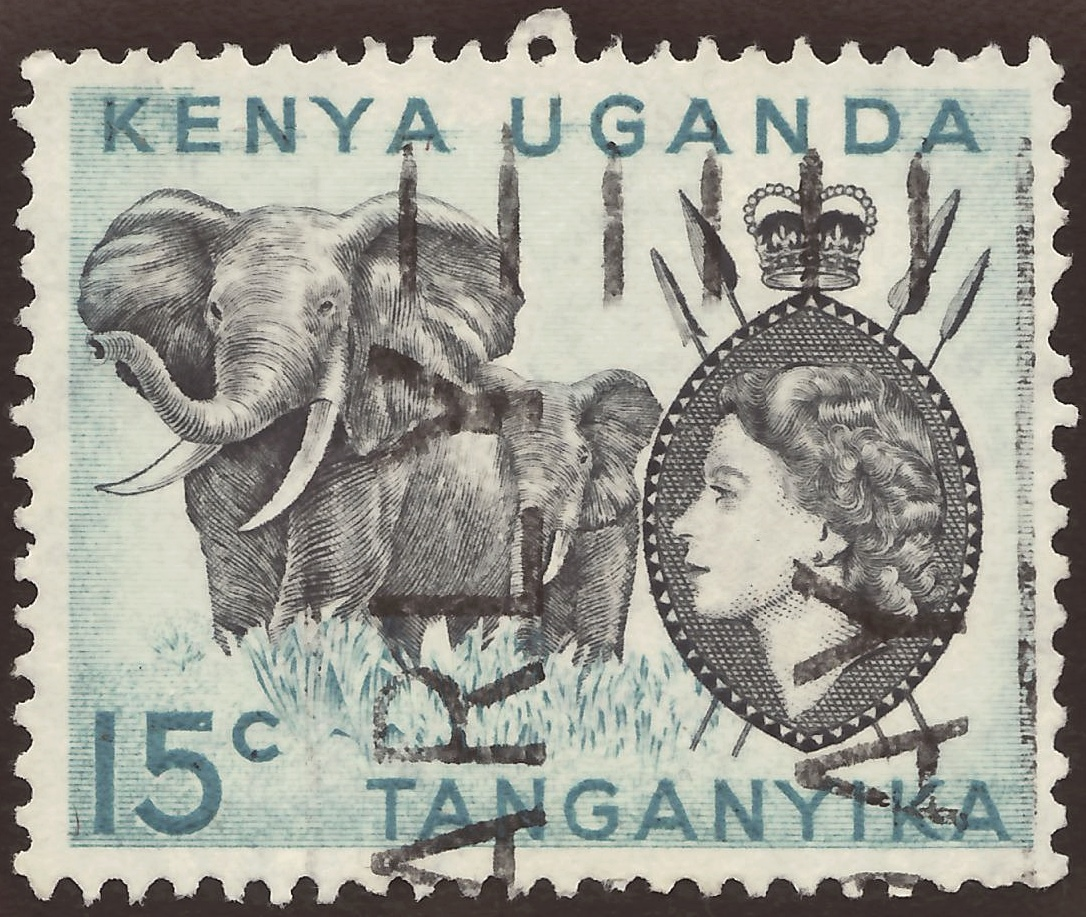

== See also ==
- Postage stamps and postal history of East Africa and Uganda Protectorates
- Postage stamps and postal history of Kenya
- Postage stamps and postal history of Tanzania
- Postage stamps and postal history of Uganda
