= Postage stamps and postal history of East Africa and Uganda Protectorates =

East Africa and Uganda Protectorates was the name used by the combined postal service of the British protectorates, British East Africa and Uganda, between 1 April 1903 and 22 July 1920.

== East Africa and Uganda Protectorates ==
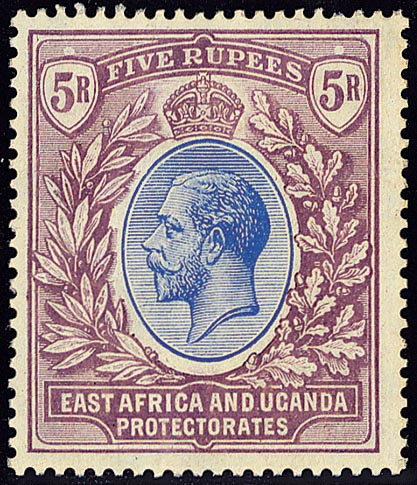
1912 East Africa and Uganda Protectorates five rupee stamp

The administration issued postage stamps with the profile of King Edward VII and inscribed "EAST AFRICA AND UGANDA PROTECTORATES" in 1903. The same basic design was used throughout the period, with new watermark and colours in 1904 and 1907, respectively, and the substitution of King George V in 1912. The 6c stamp was surcharged 4c in 1919.

While the lower-denomination stamps are common, stamps of up to 500 rupees were sold, primarily for use as revenue stamps. Postal usages of the higher values are scarce and valuable.

== Kenya and Uganda ==
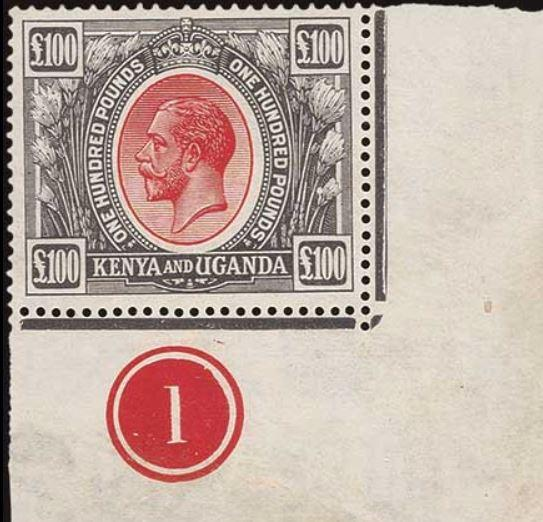
1925 Kenya and Uganda stamp

On 23 July 1920 British East Africa became a Crown Colony of Kenya, with the exception of a coastal strip which remained a protectorate. Stamps were then inscribed "KENYA AND UGANDA"

== Postal stationery ==
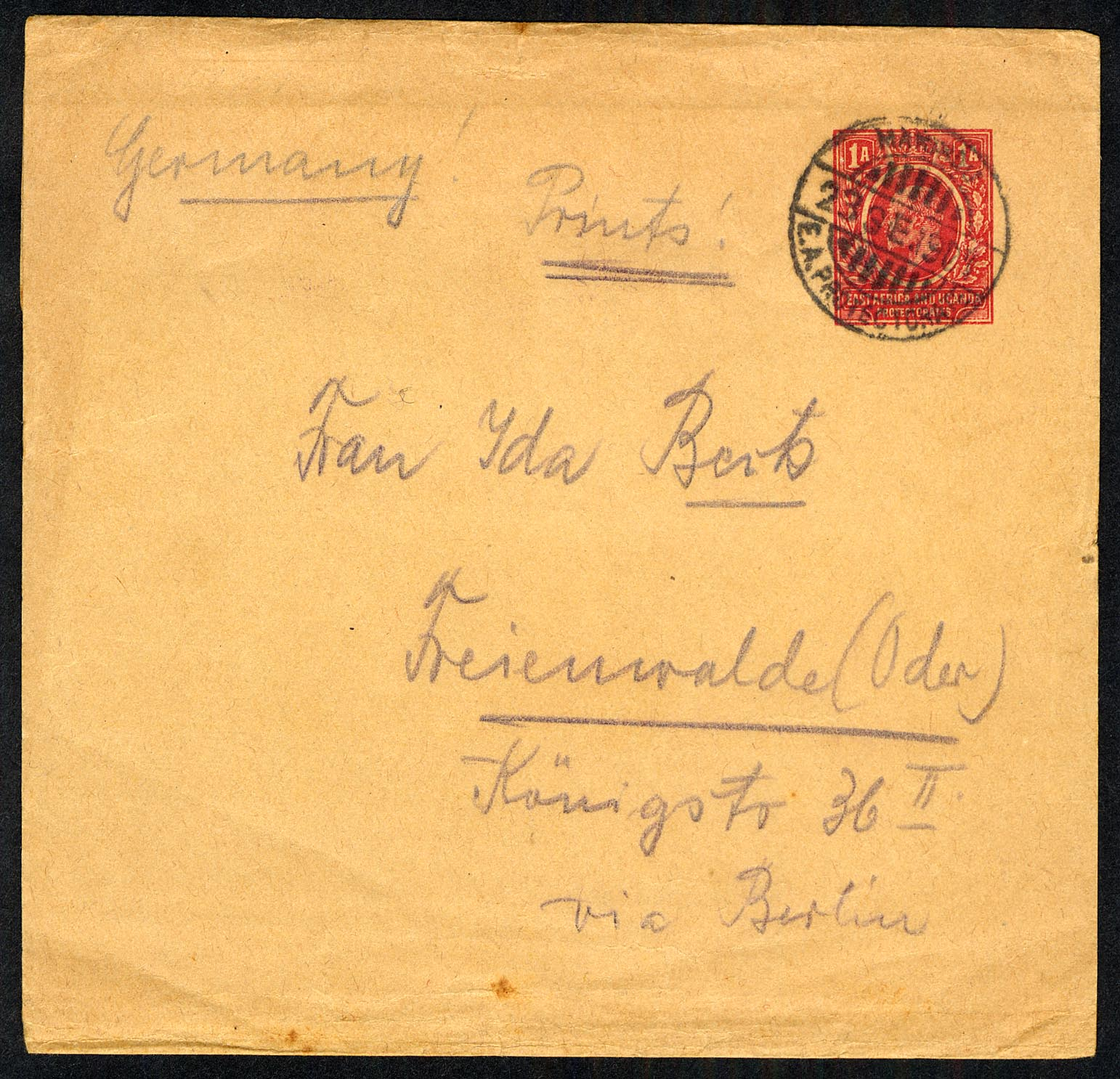
East Africa and Uganda one anna wrapper used 23 September 1901, postmarked "MALINDI E.A.PROTECTORATE", addressed to Germany

The postal administration of East Africa and Uganda issued post paid envelopes, registration envelopes, wrappers, postcards and a telegram sheet. The designs of the imprints on registrations envelopes, newspaper wrappers and postcards were similar to that used on the stamps.

A total of four post paid envelopes were issued, the stamp imprint on all was oval with the head of king. A one anna envelope was issued in 1904, a six cent envelope was issued in 1907 and finally a 6 cent and a 10 cent envelope was issued with the head of King George in 1912.

Including different sizes, a total of eleven registration envelopes have been identified as having been issued; three during the reign of Edward VII and eight during the reign of George V.

Three different wrappers with the Edward VII design were produced and two with George V.

A total of 12 postcards are known to have been issued; eight during the reign of Edward VII and four during the reign of George V.

One unusual item of postal stationery item, issued in 1903, was a telegram sheet with a one rupee stamp imprint. The design of the stamp was hexagonal with the head of Edward VII in a circle in the centre.

== See also ==
- Postage stamps and postal history of Kenya, Uganda, Tanganyika
- Postage stamps and postal history of Kenya
- Postage stamps and postal history of Uganda
- Revenue stamps of Kenya

== References and sources ==
Sources

- Rossiter, Stuart & John Flower. The Stamp Atlas. London: Macdonald, 1986. ISBN 0-356-10862-7
- Scott catalogue
