= Postage stamps and postal history of Australia =

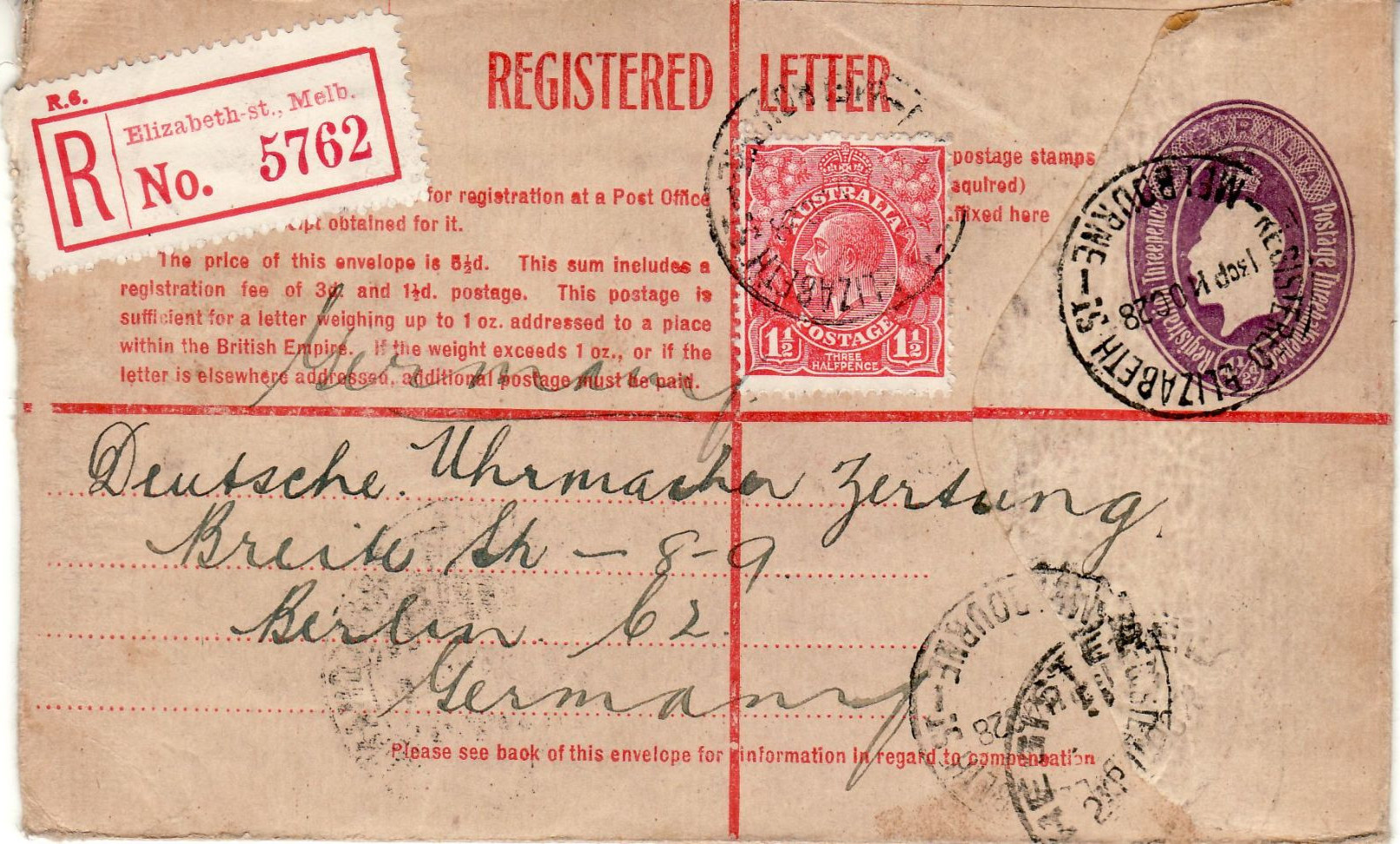
1928 postal stationery registered envelope uprated with stamp to pay the rate to Berlin

The postage stamps and postal history of Australia encompasses history of the Australian colonies and the main stamp issues that followed their federation in 1901, as well as later issues, and also a precis of the stamps of the external territories.

== Federation ==
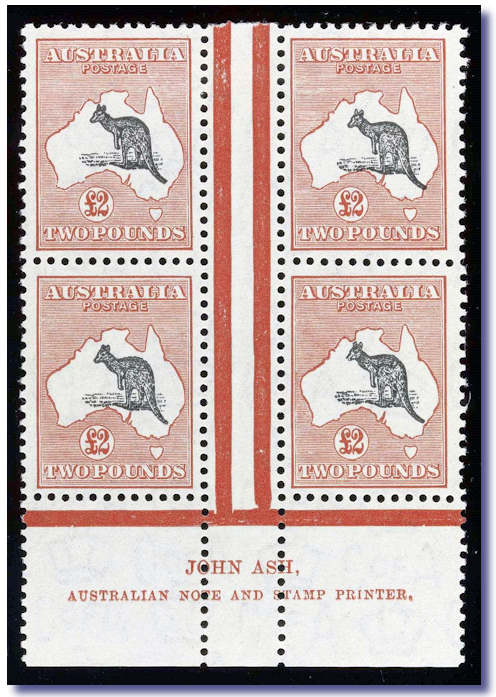
A block of four £2 "Roo" stamps showing the printer's imprint in the selvedge

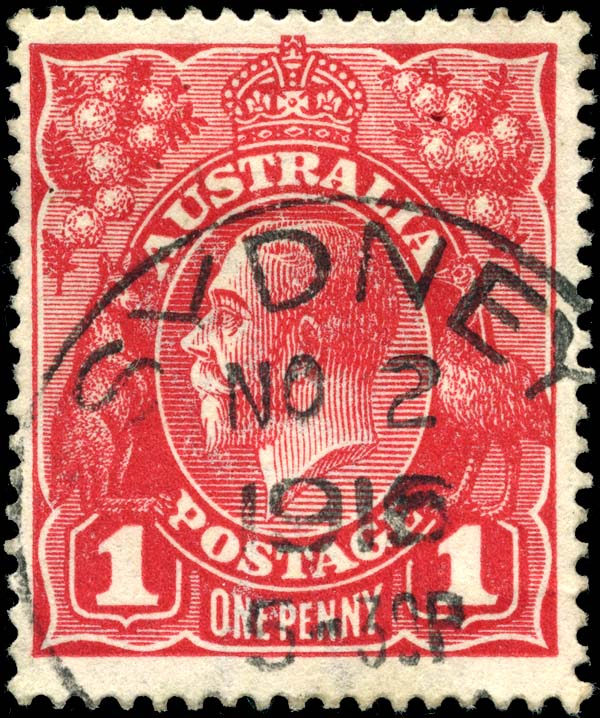
1d King George V, used at Sydney in 1916

The six self-governing Australian colonies that formed the Commonwealth of Australia on 1 January 1901 had operated their own postal service and issued their own stamps – see articles on the systems on New South Wales (first stamps issued 1850), Victoria (1850), Tasmania (1853), Western Australia (1854), South Australia (1855) and Queensland (1860). Section 51(v) of the Australian Constitution empowered the Commonwealth to make laws in respect of "postal, telegraphic, telephonic, and other like services".

The Commonwealth created the Postmaster-General's Department on 1 March 1901, which took over all the colonial mail systems and the then-current colony stamps. Those stamps continued to be valid, becoming de facto Commonwealth stamps. Some of them continued to be used for some time following the introduction of the Commonwealth's uniform postage stamp series in 1913. They continued to be valid for postage until 14 February 1966 when the introduction of decimal currency invalidated all stamps bearing the earlier currency.

Circumstances precluded the immediate issue of a uniform Commonwealth postage stamp. But there was no hindrance in respect to a Postage Due series. The first of these, the design of which was based on the current New South Wales postage due stamps, was issued in July 1902.

Postal rates became uniform between the new states on 1 May 1911 because of the extension of the United Kingdom domestic postal rate of 1d per half ounce (Imperial Penny Post) to Australia as a member of the British Empire. One penny became the uniform domestic postage rate. One penny postcards and lettercards also appeared in 1911. In the same year, the Postmaster-General's Department held a stamp design competition for a uniform series of Commonwealth postage stamps. This competition attracted over one thousand entries.

== The "Roo" stamp ==
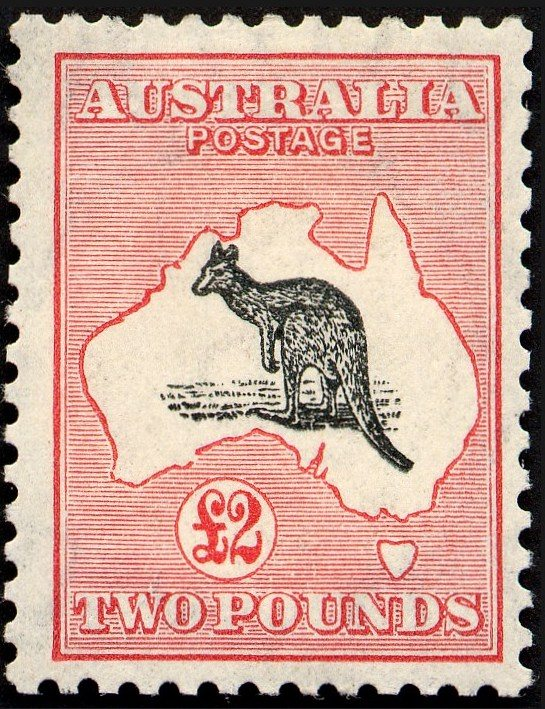
The £2 stamp in the Kangaroo and Map series

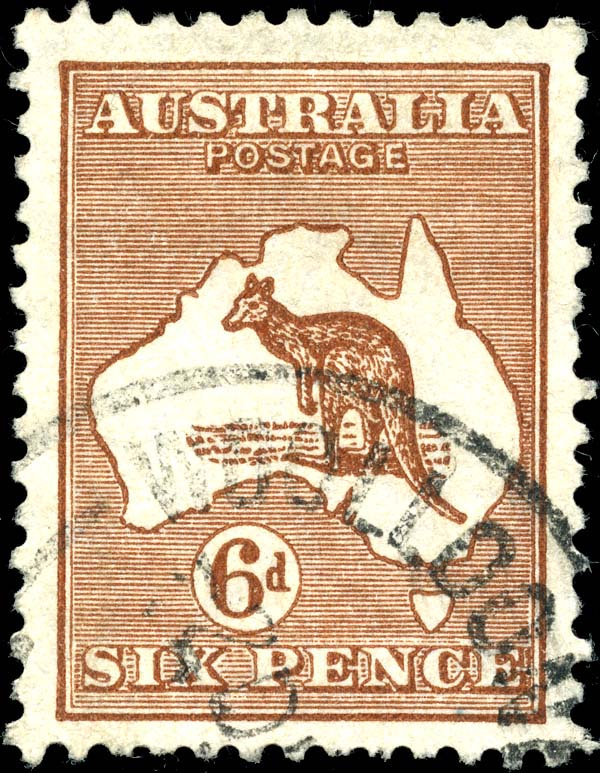
6d "kangaroo & map", used at Woolloongabba, Queensland

The first definitive stamp inscribed "Australia" was a red 1d "Kangaroo and Map" stamp, the design of which was adopted in part from the entry that won the Stamp Design Competition. Although the delay between federation and the first Australian stamps had several causes, one of the major reasons was political wrangling regarding the design. There was significant opposition to any inclusion of British royal symbols or profiles.

A design completion was announced in 1911, and several designs were chosen, including those with the monarch's profile. The government decided to have only one design, and Charlie Frazer, then postmaster-general, inspired the basic features of the new design. Blamire Young, a local watercolour artist, was commissioned to produce the final design.

The first definitive series, issued on 2 January 1913, comprised fifteen stamps, ranging in value from ½d to £2. The Kangaroo and Map design was ordered by the Fisher Labor Government, which included a number of republicans who strenuously opposed the incorporation of the monarch's profile on Australian stamps. One of the first acts of the Cook Liberal Government, sworn in on 14 June 1913, was to order a series of postage stamps with the profile of George V. On 8 December 1913, the first of those, an engraved 1d carmine-red, appeared. Soon after, typographed values of the design appeared, ranging from ½d (halfpenny) to 1/4d (one shilling and four pence). The Postmaster-General's Department kept both basic designs on issue for some time – 38 years for the Kangaroo and Map design, and 23 years for the George V (until his death).

In about 1948, H. Dormer Legge published his study of the stamps: The Kangaroo Issues of the stamps of the Commonwealth of Australia.

== Later definitive stamps ==
With the accession of George VI in 1936, until the early 1970s, Australian definitives featured the monarch, Australian fauna and Australian flora. However, particularly in the late 1950s, the depiction of the monarch on Australian definitives became confined to the base domestic letter rate and the preceding minor values. With the introduction of decimal currency on 14 February 1966, 24 new definitives were issued – the monarch was featured on the minor values (1c to 3c) and on the base domestic letter rate (4c) and the remainder featured Australian birds, Australian marine life, and early Australian maritime explorers. A feature of this issue was that where there was a direct conversion of value, the design was changed to reflect the new decimal currency value – for example, the 2/6d (two shilling and sixpence) Scarlet Robin definitive (issued 21 April 1965) become the new 25c decimal currency value; likewise the £2 (two pounds) Phillip Parker King definitive (issued 26 August 1964) became the new $4 decimal currency value.

The last base domestic letter rate definitive stamp featuring the monarch appeared on 1 October 1971. Since then, the designs of all Australian definitive values have focused on fauna, flora, reptiles, butterflies, marine life, gemstones, paintings, handicrafts, visual arts, community and the like. Due to complaints by royalists about the dropping of the monarch, a stamp has been issued annually since 1980 to commemorate the monarch's birthday.

Since the 1990s, the increasing commercial focus of Australia Post has led to the design of stamps being more focused on the demands of the commercial market, rather than as a government endorsed view of the national identity. Generally stamps have avoided subjects of contemporary political controversy, although in 2019 a stamp commemorating the legalisation of same-sex marriage (following a national postal survey) was released.

== First commemorative stamp ==
Australia's first commemorative stamp was issued on 9 May 1927 to mark the opening of the first Parliament House in Canberra. Subsequently, issues have appeared regularly commemorating Australian achievements and landmarks in Australian history. The first Australian multicoloured stamps appeared on 31 October 1956 as part of the Melbourne Olympic Games commemorative issue. These were printed by a foreign company. The first Australian-printed multicoloured stamp, commemorating the 50th anniversary of the Australian Inland Mission, was issued on 5 September 1962.

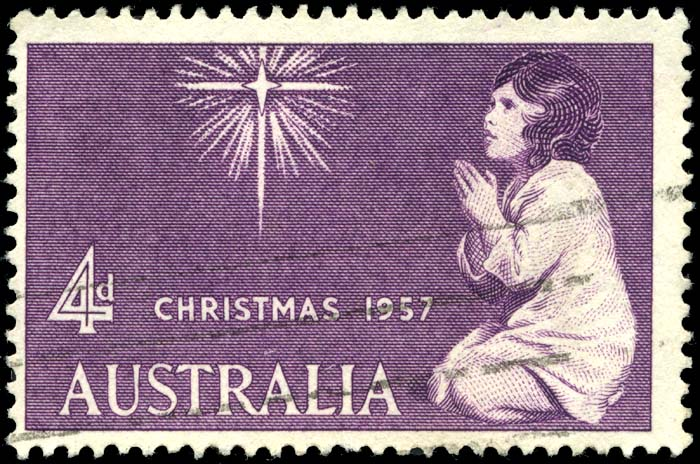
1957 Christmas stamp

There have been many special issues. The first Christmas stamp appeared on 6 November 1957. In recent years, designs for the Christmas issue have alternated each year between the religious and the secular. From 1993, in October of every year, Australia Post has commemorated Stamp Collecting month with special issues, typically featuring topics that are of interest to children such as pets, native fauna and space. Commencing with the 2000 Sydney Olympic Games, during the Summer and Winter Olympic Games, stamps featuring Australians who have won an Olympic gold medal are issued on the next postal business day after the achievement.

== Airmails ==
Australia's first airmail-designated stamp appeared on 20 May 1929. A special 3d (three pence) airmail stamp was available for mail sent on the Perth-Adelaide air service. The cost of this service was 3d per ½ oz plus normal postage. On 19 March 1931 and 4 November 1931, a further two airmail-designated stamps, both 6d (sixpence), appeared. After these, general definitives were used for mail sent by air.

== Stamp booklets ==
Coin-operated vending machines were introduced in 1960 and have continued in various forms to the present day. These included Frama vending machines stamps, first issued in 1984 and discontinued in 2003, as well as various booklets. Booklet stamps were discontinued in 1973 but were reintroduced some years later. Stamp booklets were available from Advance Bank ATMs from 1984 until the bank's merger with St George Bank in 1996. These were Australia's first (and, to date, only) triangular stamp issue.

== Self-adhesive stamps ==
Self-adhesive stamps were first issued in 1990. The first self-adhesive commemoratives appeared in 1993. Self-adhesive stamps have proved popular with users and very soon came to be in more common use than gummed stamps. Australia issues gummed versions of all self-adhesive stamps.

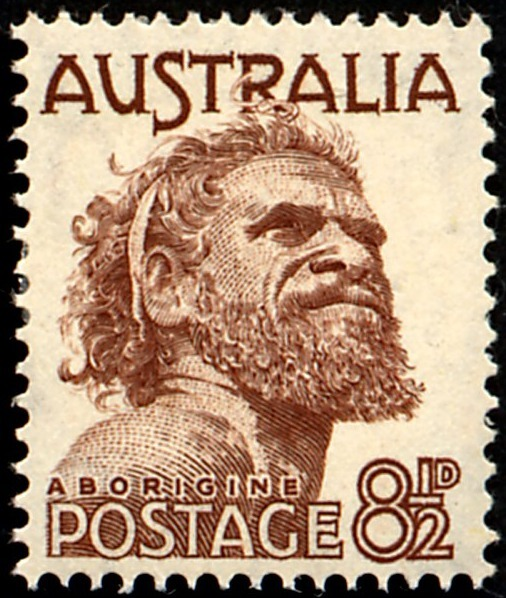
Gwoya Tjungurrayi depicted on a 1950 stamp

Prior to 1997, the official policy of Australia Post was to not depict living persons on stamps other than members of the royal family. However, in 1950 Anmatyerre man Gwoya Tjungurrayi became the first living Australian depicted on a stamp. Presumably, the rule was not taken into consideration as the stamp was intended to depict a generic image of an Aboriginal person. Since 1997, Australia Post has formally adjusted its policy and has issued stamps commemorating living Australians. In particular, an annual Australian Legends issue has commemorated living Australians who have made some significant contribution during their lives, with Sir Donald Bradman being the first depicted.

Stamps with personalized tabs were introduced in 1999. Australia Post has also used tabs to commemorate themes and individuals not considered significant enough for a stamp issue of their own.

== Postal rates ==
Since the introduction of the Goods and Services Tax, separate stamps were introduced for domestic and international postage in 2001. Stamps inscribed "International Post" are not valid for domestic postage. Domestic stamps can be used for overseas postage but contribute less than face value towards the postage (the user must deduct the tax component).

== Official Service stamps ==
From the 1913 to 1930, Commonwealth and State Government agencies used stamps (perfins) punctured with OS ("Official Service"). In 1931 the puncturing system was abandoned and stamps for government mail were overprinted OS. In February 1933, it was decided that government mail would no longer require postage stamps. The exception to OS stamps being restricted for the use of government agencies was the 4 November 1931 6d airmail stamp. The OS overprinted stamp was sold over post office counters to prevent speculation and was valid for all types of mail.

== Joint issues ==
Australia has had joint stamp issues with New Zealand (1958, 1963 and 1988), the United Kingdom (1963, 1988 and 2005), some of its external territories (1965), the United States of America (1988), the U.S.S.R. (1990), People's Republic of China (1995), Germany (1996), Indonesia (1996), Singapore (1998), Greece (2000), Hong Kong (2001), Sweden (2001), France (2002) and Thailand (2002).

== Postal stationery ==
Postal stationery was first issued by the Commonwealth of Australia in April 1911. Postcards based on the design of South Australia 1893 postcards and a "Stamp" design of a full face of King George V, engraved by Samuel Reading, were issued in April 1911. Letter Cards with the same "Stamp" design were also issued. Envelopes, Registered envelopes and Newspaper wrappers were first issued in 1913, using the "Kangaroo on Map" "Stamp" design by Blamire Young. Aerogrammes were first issued in 1944.

== External territories ==
Each Australian external territory has a specific postal and philatelic history.

Formerly administered by New South Wales, Norfolk Island used that colony's stamps after 1877. Norfolk Island used stamps of Australia between 1913 and 1947, attained postal independence and issued its own stamps on 10 June 1947. Norfolk Island lost postal independence in 2016.

The Territory of Papua, officially a British colony but administered by Australia, issued its own stamps from 1901. before this, it had used Queensland stamps. Stamps of Australia were issued there between 1945 and 1953 in the new Territory of Papua and New Guinea.

Transferred from Singapore to Australia by the United Kingdom in the 1950s, Christmas Island and Cocos (Keeling) Islands were progressively and separately integrated into the Australian postal system and losing their postal and philatelic independence in the 1990s. While Christmas Island had postal independence and issued its own stamps since 1958, the Cocos Islands used stamps of Australia from 1952 until its postal independence in 1979. The first Cocos stamps were issued in 1963.

Both territories lost their postal independence to Australia Post in 1993 for Christmas Island and 1994 for the Cocos Islands. Consequently, their stamps became valid within Australia and stamps of Australia became valid in the islands.

The Australian Antarctic Territory had always been using stamps of Australia but disposed of its stamps since 27 March 1957. They are valid for postage within Australia.

== Military occupations and mandates ==
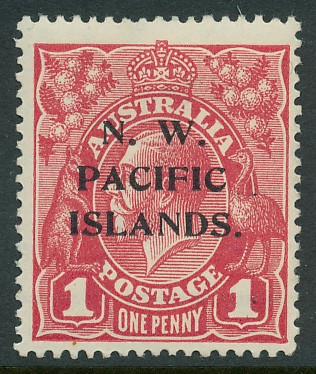
Australian stamp overprinted "N. W. Pacific Islands." for the former German colonies, 1918

With military operations during World War I, Australia occupied two former German colonies, German New Guinea and Nauru. German colonial stamps were overprinted, followed by Australian stamps overprinted "North West Pacific Islands" in 1915. In the 1920s, stamps were issued for these two territories as League of Nations mandates.

Nauru and New Guinea were under Japanese occupation in 1942. At the end of World War II, in 1945, stamps of Australia were used in mandate of New Guinea and in Papua until 1 March 1953. The new combined Territory of Papua and New Guinea received its own stamps bearing the name "Territory of Papua and New Guinea" until its independence in 1975.

=== British Commonwealth Occupation Force ===
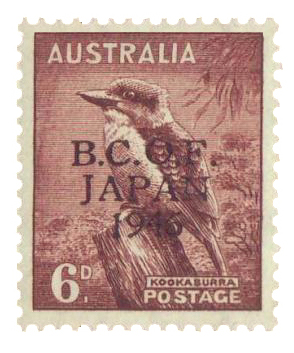
Australian stamp overprinted for use by British Commonwealth Occupation Force in Japan, 1946

Between October 1946 and February 1949, in occupied Japan, the Australian stamps used as such by the military post offices were overprinted "B.C.O.F. / JAPAN / 1946" to avoid speculation on the currency value.

== See also ==
- Kangaroo stamps of Australia
- Postage stamps and postal history of New South Wales
- Postage stamps and postal history of Queensland
- Postage stamps and postal history of South Australia
- South Australian stamp overprints
- Postage stamps and postal history of Tasmania
- Postage stamps and postal history of Victoria
- Postage stamps and postal history of Western Australia
- Revenue stamps of Australia
- Postage stamps and postal history of New Zealand
- List of postage rates in Australia

== References and sources ==
=== Sources ===
- Australia Post Philatelic Group: Australian Stamp Bulletin. Melbourne: Australian Postal Corporation, various bulletins.
- Higgs, John: The Australasian Stamp Catalogue. Sydney: Seven Seas Stamps, 1996.
- Kellow, Geoffrey, and others: Australian Commonwealth Specialist’ Catalogue. Sydney: Brunsden-White, 1988–2002.
- Pitt, Alan: Stamps of Australia. Sydney: Renniks Publications, 2005.
- Altman, Dennis (2021). "Stamps". In Harper, Melissa; White, Richard (eds.). Symbols of Australia: Imagining a nation (2nd ed.). Sydney, NSW: NewSouth Publishing. ISBN 978-1-74223-712-1.
