= Postage stamps and postal history of New South Wales =

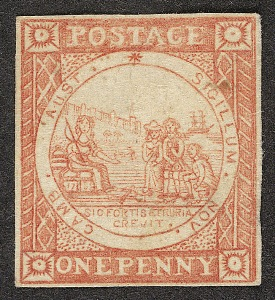
1850 red 1d stamp; the first issued in New South Wales. One of the "Sydney Views". Around the image is the text "Sigillum Nov. Camb. Aust." ("Seal of New South Wales") with the motto "Sic fortis Etruria crevit" ("thus mighty Etruria grew") underneath.

This is a survey of the postage stamps and postal history of New South Wales, a former British colony now part of Australia.

== Pre-stamp era ==
New South Wales was the first part of Australia to be settled by Europeans, and the first to operate a postal service, which in 1803 was carrying letters between Sydney and Parramatta for a 2d charge. In 1809 a collecting office in Sydney was established to receive mail from passing ships, and in 1825 the postal service was expanded. Mail coach service began in 1830, and in 1835 a new Postage Act superseded the 1825 statute and set rates based on weight and distance travelled.

The postmaster of the time, James Raymond, was in communication with Rowland Hill in England and worked to encourage the prepayment of letters in NSW. In 1838, Raymond introduced envelopes embossed with the seal of the colony, and available for local mail for 1¼ pence each instead of the 2d charged letters paid for in cash. They are thus regarded as precursors of the Penny Black. However, the envelopes were not popular, and in 1841 Raymond was unable to develop official interest in postage stamps for the colony.

== First stamps ==
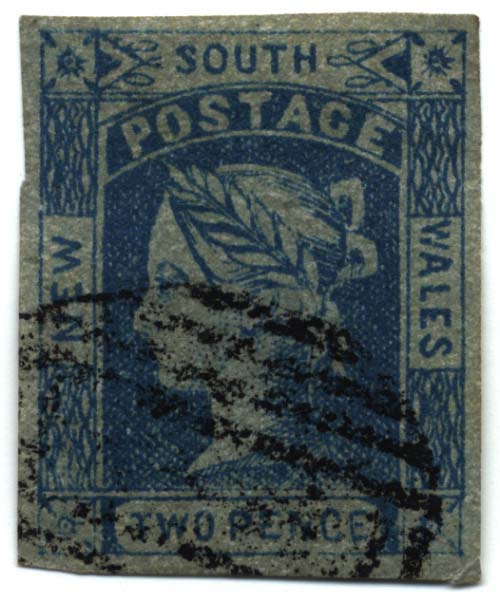
1853 2d blue design, re-engraving of 1855 (plate 3) with crossed lines in background

In 1842 regular mail service was carried by steamer between Melbourne and Sydney, and the first mail packet from Britain arrived in 1844. An act of 1848 reformed the postal system and authorised the use of stamps; the first stamps appeared on 1 January 1850. They were locally produced, and depicted a scene of Sydney and its harbour, thus becoming known as the "Sydney Views". The 1d, 2d, and 3d stamps were separately engraved, and then re-engraved and retouched over the next year, yielding dozens of varieties.

In 1851 the colony switched to a more conventional design, a profile of Queen Victoria wearing a laurel wreath, first in a somewhat crude rendition, then a better one in 1853. The colony also took the unusual step of using paper watermarked with the denomination, a practice that resulted in a number of mismatches between watermark and printed denomination that are rare and highly prized today.

In 1854 the colony issued 6d and 1/- stamps printed locally, from plates engraved by Perkins Bacon in England. These were large square stamps with the standard profile of Victoria wearing a diadem, framed with a hexagon and octagon respectively. The designs were reused for 5d and 8d in 1855.

In 1856 a Perkins Bacon design was also adopted for the lower values as well. The inking of all these was highly variable, and there are dozens of distinct colour varieties. The use of perforation began in 1860; unfortunately for collectors, the stamps were very closely spaced, the perforating process not well controlled, and it is unusual to find stamps from before 1899 where the perforation does not touch or cut into the design on one or more sides.

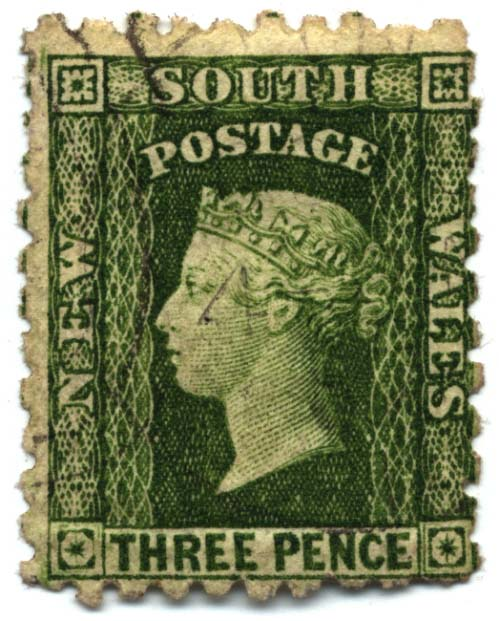
1856 3d green; a perf. 10 version printed in 1891.

The first 5-shilling stamp was issued in 1861, and it was notable for being a round design resembling a medallion. In 1861, new designs were created by De La Rue and printed both in London and the colony.

In 1871 a watermark reading "NSW" surmounted by a crown began to replace the numerals, and in 1885 a need for high-values prompted the overprinting of 5/-, 10/-, and one-pound revenue stamps with "POSTAGE".

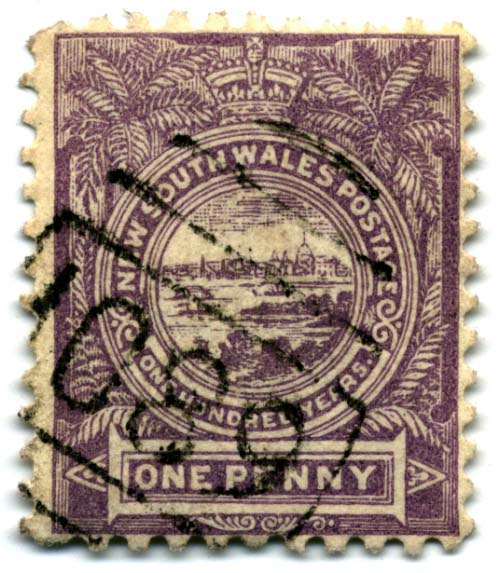
1d violet commemorative of 1888, showing a view of Sydney

New South Wales celebrated its 100th anniversary in 1888 with an issue of what is widely considered to be the first commemorative stamps. The set of eight, each with a different design, were all inscribed "ONE HUNDRED YEARS". Among the designs were a view of Sydney, an emu, Captain Cook, a lyrebird, and a kangaroo. The 20/- value included portraits of both Arthur Phillip the first governor, and the then-governor Lord Carrington.

A 2½d stamp depicting an allegorical figure of Australia appeared in 1890, while ½d, 7½d, and 12½d values were produced in 1891 as surcharges on existing stamps.

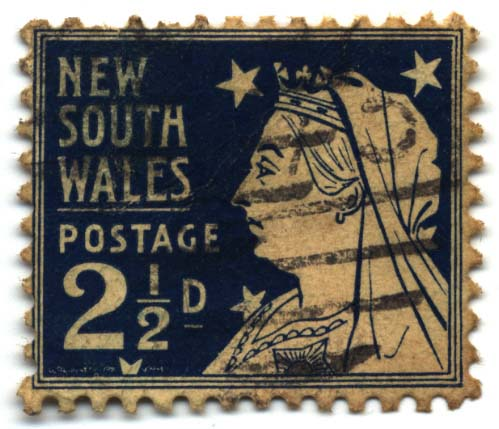
1899 reissue in dark blue of 1897 2½d Diamond Jubilee stamp

In 1897 two early semi-postal stamps were issued, paying 1d and 2½d rates, but sold for 1/- and 2/6 respectively, the additional proceeds going to a Consumptives' Home. In the same year a set of three stamps marked Victoria's Diamond Jubilee.

The formation of the Commonwealth had no immediate effect on the NSW postal system. Although the new constitution granted the commonwealth power to run a national postal service, unification was not immediate. The systems gradually merged during the 1900s. In 1903 a 9d stamp in two colors (brown and blue) was inscribed "COMMONWEALTH" and mentioned the initials of each member along with its year of founding. In 1905 the stamps began to be printed on paper watermarked with a crown and the letter "A", with reprintings of existing designs occurring into 1910.

In 1913 the stamps of New South Wales were superseded by those of Australia.

Most of the stamps of New South Wales are readily available today, but it is somewhat complex to collect; there are a dozen types of watermarks, multiple perforations, and numerous colour shades. While the Scott catalog distinguishes about 200 major types, it calls out many more minor varieties, and the Stanley Gibbons catalog totals some 400 distinct varieties.

== Numeral cancellations ==
Numeral cancellations on New South Wales postage stamps are also of interest to collectors. Ninety-six post offices had already been opened when the first postage stamps were issued on 1 January 1850. Numeral obliterators were allocated to these post offices to cancel stamps on outgoing mail. Sydney itself had no number and used dumb obliterators. The first allotment of numbers was based on the pattern of roads radiating outward from Sydney.

Numerals and obliterators continued to be allocated to opening post offices up to the beginning of 1904 with 2099 (Toolijooa) probably the last number assigned. The patterns of allocation provide a way of tracking the history of settlement of the state, although made complex by re-allocations as post offices closed or jurisdiction was transferred, as happened when Queensland became a separate colony.

Larger post offices also impressed a date-stamp on covers with the name of the originating office. This means that covers or stamps torn from covers or pairs of stamps can be used to tie numbers to mailing offices where official records are missing. Even so, as many as 300 New South Wales numbers are still untied.

There can be many variations of numeral cancellations depending on the type of obliterator used. The first obliterators allocated had horizontal bars. These were followed by "ray" types. The colour of the ink used might also vary. The Sydney obliterators also exist in many variations.

Most collectors of numerical cancellations ignore the stamp itself, which may appear upside-down or sideways in albums or stock cards.

== Postal stationery ==
New South Wales issued its own postal stationery until the Commonwealth of Australia stationery was made available in 1911. Envelopes were issued in 1838 for local use within Sydney, New South Wales and were used till 1857. Between 1870 and 1911 eleven different envelopes were produced and issued. Registration envelopes were first made available to the public in 1880 and a total of 14 different were produced. Newspaper wrappers were available from 1864, New South Wales being the second postal administration after the United States to issue newspaper wrappers. A total of 12 different wrappers are known. Letter cards were in use from 1894 and a total of 11 different letter cards were produced. Postcards were available from 1875 and, by the time the Australian Commonwealth postcards were introduced, New South Wales had produced a total of 34 different items.

== See also ==
- Stamps and postal history of Australia
- Revenue stamps of New South Wales
- for further stamps images.

== References and sources ==
Sources

- Andrew Houison, History of the Post Office: together with an historical account of the issue of postage stamps in New South Wales, Sydney, Government Printer, 1890.
- Stanley Gibbons Ltd: various catalogues
- The Encyclopaedia of Postal Authorities
- Stuart Rossiter & John Flower: The Stamp Atlas
- Alan G. Brown & Hugh M. Campbell: New South Wales Numeral Cancellations, 2nd ed., 1977
- H.M. Campbell: Australian Numeral Cancellations: A Compendium, 1983
- Hugh M. Campbell: Queensland Postal History and Australian Numerical Cancellations. Supplements, 1997
