= Revenue stamps of Australia =

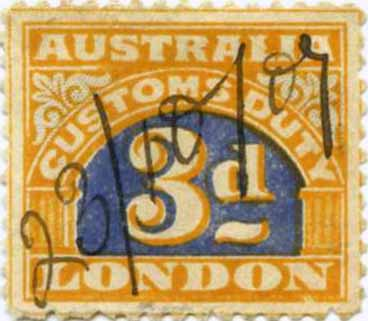
A 1907 customs duty revenue stamp of Australia.

Australia issued revenue stamps from 1907 to 1994. There were various types for different taxes. In addition to Commonwealth issues, the states of New South Wales, Queensland, South Australia, Tasmania, Victoria and Western Australia as well as the territories Australian Capital Territory, North Australia and Northern Territory also had their own stamps.

== Beer Tax (1918–1948) ==
Beer tax stamps were first issued in 1918 and were stuck to beer kegs. Most are very rare since they were either torn or completely destroyed when used. There were several issues with changes in design and colour until 1948. The final issues are commoner as they exist as mint remainders.

== Customs Duty (1907–1958) ==
Customs Duty stamps were used to pay the duty on printed matter, price lists and circulars coming from abroad. They were issued at the origin, so they were inscribed LONDON at foot. They were first issued in 1907 and were reprinted until 1958. There is a wide range of printings with variations in the perforations, letter size, serifs, frames, ornaments and stamp size. In 1911 some were overprinted in the US dollar for duty between America and Australia.

== Departure Tax (1978–1994) ==
The first stamps for departure tax were issued in 1978. Various stamps in similar designs continued to be issued until 1994. Since children under 12 were exempt from this tax, some stamps were issued with EXEMPT instead of the value.

== Entertainments Tax (c.1946-c.1949) ==
Between c.1946 and c.1949 a set of adhesive entertainments tax stamps replaced imprinted stamps on tickets. All are rare.

== Health and Pensions Insurance (1938) ==
A set of Health and Pensions Insurance stamps was intended to be issued in 1938. Fourteen values were prepared but none were issued. However some remainders have leaked into the market and now they are highly sought after by collectors.

== Immigration Clearance Fee (1988) ==
The only stamp for immigration clearance fee is a $5 with a design similar to that of departure tax stamps but with the appropriate inscription.

== Patent Office (1954–1988) ==
Patent Office stamps were introduced in 1953 with a set of twelve values ranging from 2s to £12. In 1966 the same design was reissued in decimal currency and in 1978 a new set was issued. These were withdrawn in 1988.

== Tax Instalment (1944–1990) ==
Tax Instalment stamps were introduced in 1944 after separate issues from each state were withdrawn. In 1966 the 1944 design was reprinted in decimal currency and this continued to be used until 1990.

== Norfolk Island ==
Norfolk Island, an Australian territory, overprinted a postage stamp with the words CHEQUE DUTY in 1984 following the introduction of tax on cheques.

== See also ==
- Postage stamps and postal history of Australia
- Revenue stamps of the Australian Capital Territory
- Revenue stamps of New South Wales
- Revenue stamps of the Northern Territory
- Revenue stamps of Queensland
- Revenue stamps of South Australia
- Revenue stamps of Tasmania
- Revenue stamps of Victoria
- Revenue stamps of Western Australia
