= Revenue stamps of Victoria =

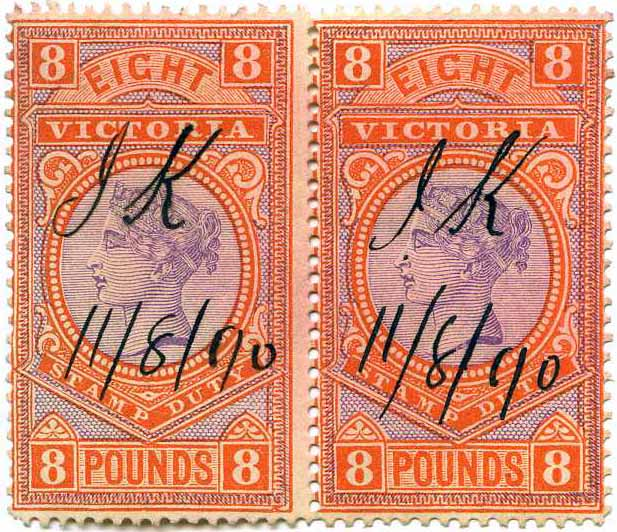
A pair of 1887 £8 stamp duty revenues used in 1890

The Australian state of Victoria issued revenue stamps from 1870 to around 2000. There were various types for different taxes.

== Beer Duty (1880-1906) ==
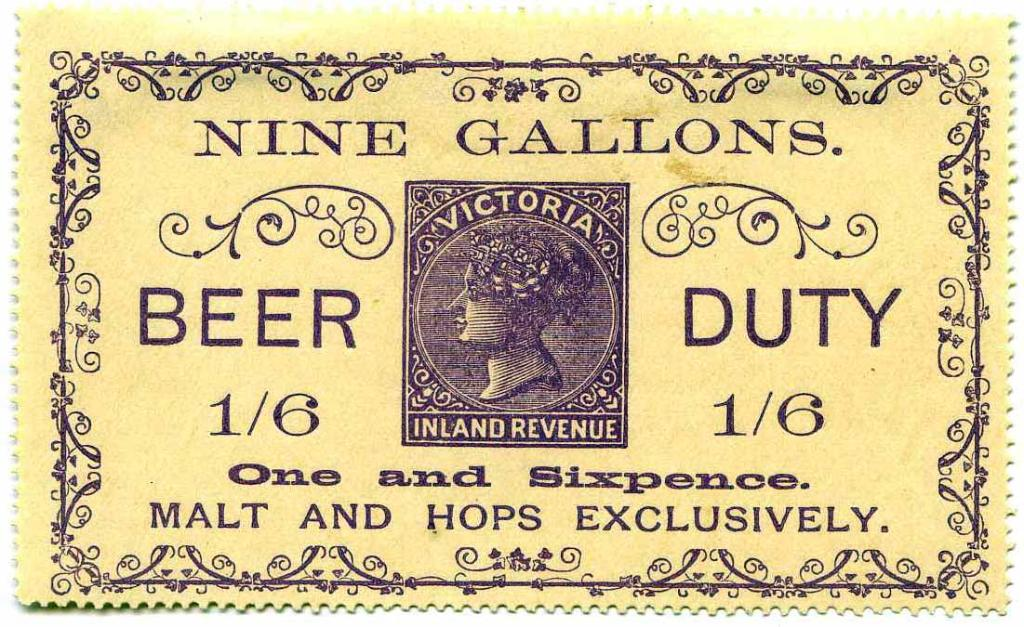
A beer duty stamp from 1892.

The first beer duty stamps were issued for beer in kegs in 1880, and like issues for the other Australian states, most were damaged or destroyed in use so most existing examples are in mint condition. The second issue was in 1881, and stamps in similar designs for use on kegs or bottles were issued until 1906. In 1918, they were replaced by Australian Commonwealth beer duty issues.

== Cattle (1927-c.2000) ==
All swine duty stamps were stamp duty revenues overprinted. Overprints exist on both numeral formats, and on both decimal stamps. There are a number of variations in the font of the overprints used.

== Hunting Tax (1973-1982) ==
From 1973 to 1981, a set of three hunting stamps with values of $2, $3 and $10, each portraying wild animals, was issued. These were replaced by a single numeral $5 value in 1982 and were withdrawn sometime later.

== Motor Transfer (c.1937) ==
The only Motor Transfer stamp was a Queen Victoria stamp duty 2s6d overprinted with a curved MOTOR TRANSFER. It is quite common.

== Penalty (c.1907) ==
The only two stamps were diamond-shaped stamps without any value issued in purple or blue.

== Relief Tax (1930) ==
Three sets of relief tax stamps were issued, all in 1930. The first two sets were specially inscribed stamps with a difference in perforation, while the second set consisted of overprints on contemporary stamp duty issues.

== Stamp Duty (1879-2005) ==
The first set had thirty one values ranging from 1d to £100 and was also valid for postage. Most later stamps until 1904 were also valid for postage and they portrayed Queen Victoria. Numerals were introduced in 1904 and these remained in use, either in large or small format, until the 1960s. In 1966 a decimal set was issued and in 1981 a second decimal set was issued in a more modern format on gloss paper and with perforation 13.5 by 13. Later issues of this format were issued on matte paper and a reduced range of values were issued on both gloss paper and matte paper with perforation 11 by 11. Circa 1996 a new format was issued with roulette 14 separation. Circa 1997 a new format was issued with roulette 4.5 separation. In addition a new $10 of the 1981 format was issued circa 1994 with the $ symbol of the $10 aligning with the left border of the map of Victoria - to date, these being observed perforation 13.5 by 13 on effervescent gloss paper and perforation 11 on matte paper.

For visual examples of the above stamp formats please go to: "oz revenues.com" - "Research Analysis & Odd Items" - "Adhesive Duty Stamps of Victoria in the Decimal era".

By 2005 all stamp duties for which payment could be evidenced by the affixing of duty stamps had been abolished in the State of Victoria and the printing of Duty Stamps had ceased by 2005.

Special stamps for Duly Stamped and Exempt were also issued in the late 19th and early 20th centuries.

== Stamp Statute (1870-1884) ==
All stamp statute issues portrayed Queen Victoria. Two sets were issued between 1870 and 1882 and they were gradually replaced by stamp duty revenues.

== Swine (1928-1966) ==
All swine duty stamps were stamp duty revenues overprinted. Overprints exist on the early types, both numeral formats, and on decimal stamps.

== Tax Instalment (1933-1941) ==
The first Tax Instalment stamps were issued in 1933 by overprinting contemporary relief tax and stamp duty stamps with the appropriate wording. Later that year an inscribed set was issued and this design was first overprinted NOT TRANSFERABLE in 1936 and in 1938 a set was issued with a revised inscription. In 1941, the keytype used in all Australian states was issued overprinted VIC below the value. Thirty values ranging from 1d to £5 were issued.

== See also ==
- Postage stamps and postal history of Victoria
- Revenue stamps of Australia
