= Postage stamps and postal history of South Australia =

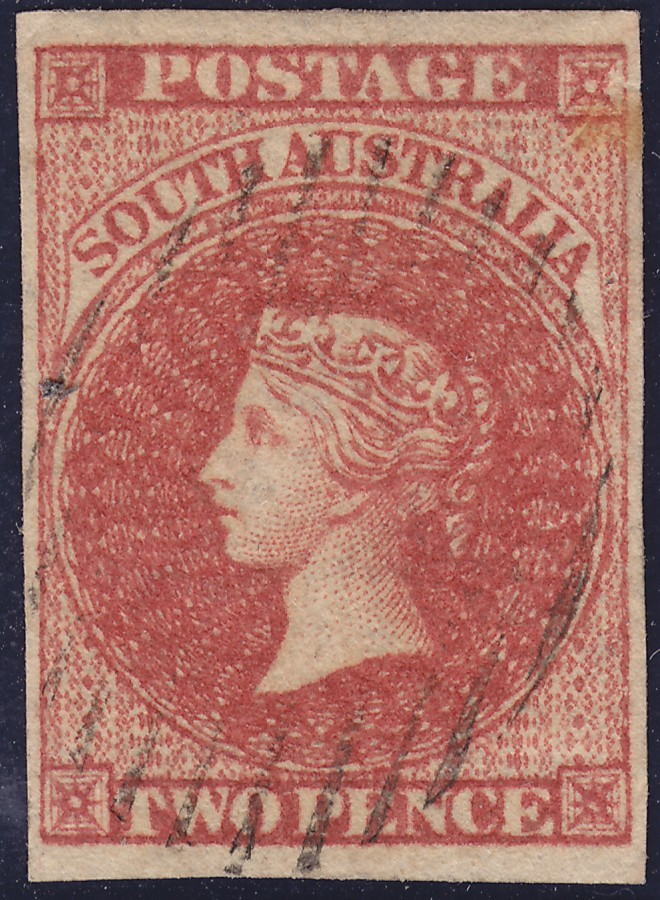
The first stamp of South Australia

This is a survey of the postage stamps and postal history of South Australia, a former British colony that is now part of Australia.

== Pre-stamp era ==
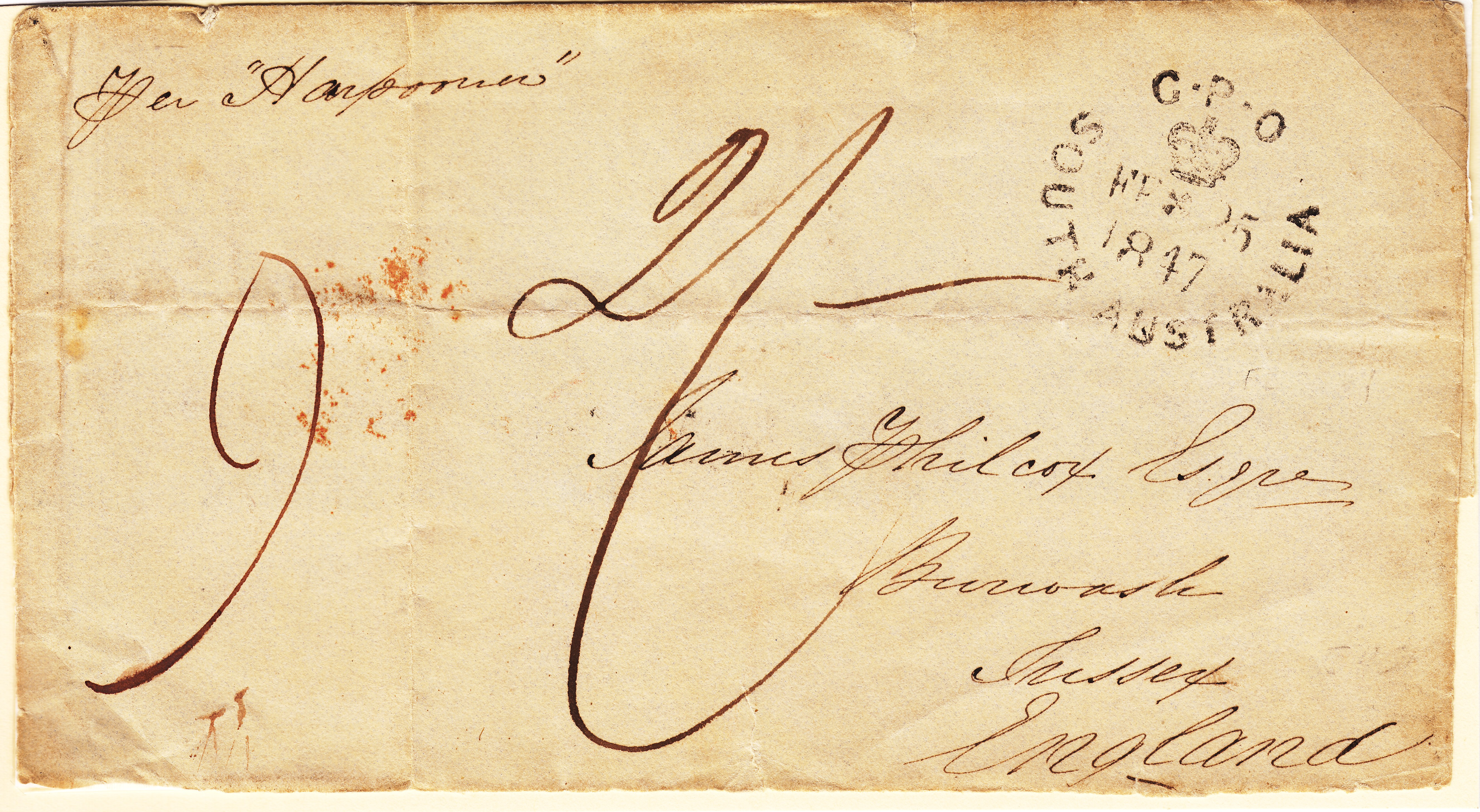
An 1847 prestamp letter from Adelaide to England

The first postmaster of South Australia was Thomas Gilbert, appointed in 1836. Letters sent or received were charged one penny. The first Post Office Act of 1839 established rates of 3 or 6 pence for letters delivered within the colony. By 1840 there were six post offices.

In July 1841 a rate based on weight and distance was implemented. The rate for letters received from places other than the other Australian colonies was set at 8 pence up to half an ounce, 1/- for up to one ounce, 1/3d for up to 1½ ounces, and 1/6d for letters up to 2 ounces. All letters or packages above 2 ounces were to be charged 2/6d. For letters to or from the other Australian colonies the rate was 6d for up to one ounce (9d, 1/-, 1/3d then 2/6 for higher weights as above).

== First stamps ==
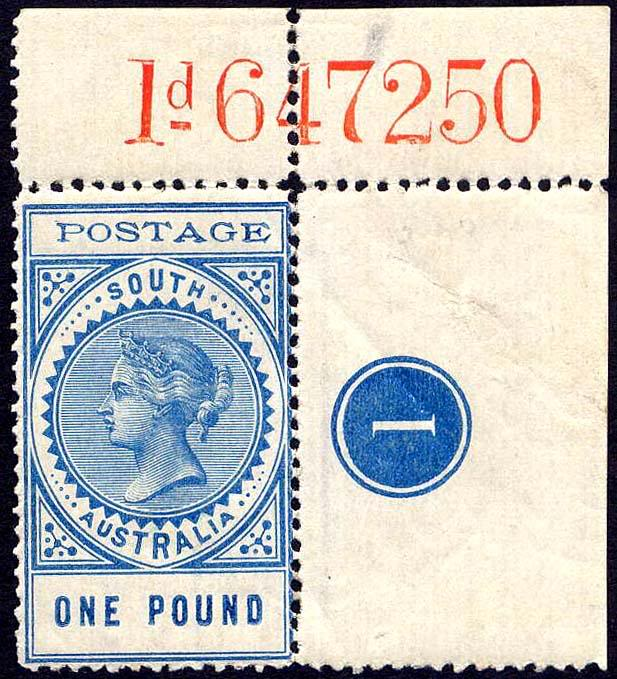
A£1 stamp of South Australia

The first stamp of South Australia was issued on 1 January 1855. The arrangements for the first issue of stamps had been made by the postmaster John Cliffe Watts in 1854. Perkins Bacon was commissioned to design and produce a two pence design for the colony. The design incorporated parts of the first issue of Chile with the sideface portrait of Queen Victoria as used in the New South Wales design. Corner designs and the value tablet were similar to the British issue. William Humphreys was the engraver. A plate of 240 impressions was used in 20 rows of 12.

The TWO PENCE value was printed in carmine-red and was put on sale to the public on 1 January 1855. Orders for three more values were placed with Perkins Bacon – ONE PENCE, SIX PENCE and ONE SHILLING values. The ONE PENNY and SIX PENCE stamps were placed on sale in the colony on 26 October 1855, however, the ONE SHILLING value was found to be an unsuitable colour when it arrived in the colony being too close in colour to the blue SIX PENCE value and almost all of the printed 500,000 sheets were burnt.

In 1913 the stamps of South Australia were superseded by those of Australia.

== See also ==
- Postage stamps and postal history of Australia
- Revenue stamps of South Australia
- South Australian stamp overprints
