= Postage stamps and postal history of Tasmania =

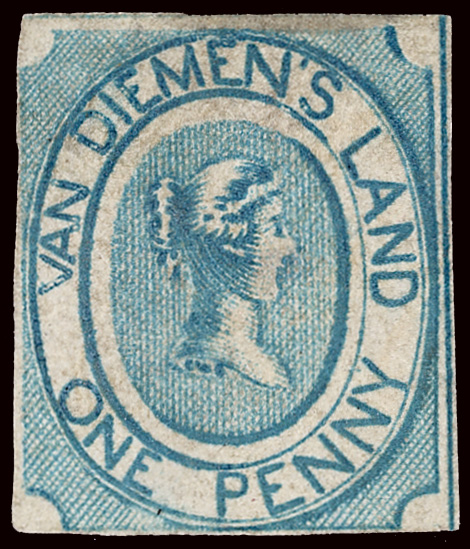
1853 The first stamp of Van Diemen's Land

This is a survey of the postage stamps and postal history of Tasmania (originally known as Van Diemen's Land), a former British colony that is now part of Australia.

== First stamps ==
The first stamps of Van Diemen's Land were issued on 1 November 1853.

The colony was renamed in 1852 but until old stamp supplies were used up the Van Diemens Land stamps were used. The first stamps inscribed Tasmania were issued in January 1858.

Until 1899, most l postage stamps portrayed Queen Victoria.However, Revenue stamps showing St George and the Dragon and also the Platypus were also issued and could be used at certain periods for postage. In 1899, a pictorial set showing views of Tasmanians scenic attractions was issued and was reprinted several times until 1912.

Tasmania's last issue was in 1912 and was superseded by those of the Commonwealth of Australia. The first such issue were the Kangaroo on Map stamps which arrived in Tasmania some time around 20 Jan 1913 and were quickly sent to post offices as stocks of the Tasmanian Pictorial Stamps ran out. The half penny and 6d Pictorial stamps continued in post office stocks until 1914.

The Commonwealth of Australia took responsibility for all postal services in Australia upon Federation in 1901 but the states continued to issue their own stamps until 1912. This delay was due to problems settling the distribution of revenue form Stamps sales. Tasmania received a disproportionate amount of revenue for stamp sales because of the presence of the Tattersalls Lottery in the state. Once negotiations about revenue arrangements between the States and the Commonwealth were finally settled, all states ceases issuing their own postage stamps and used the Commonwealth of Australia stamps.

States did continue to issue revenue stamps after 1912 as they retained the collection of their own stamp duty under the new Australian constitution.

== Postal fiscals ==
Between 1882 and 1900, revenue stamps of 1863 to 1900 were valid for postage. These postal fiscals remained in use unofficially until some time after 1900.

== Gallery ==
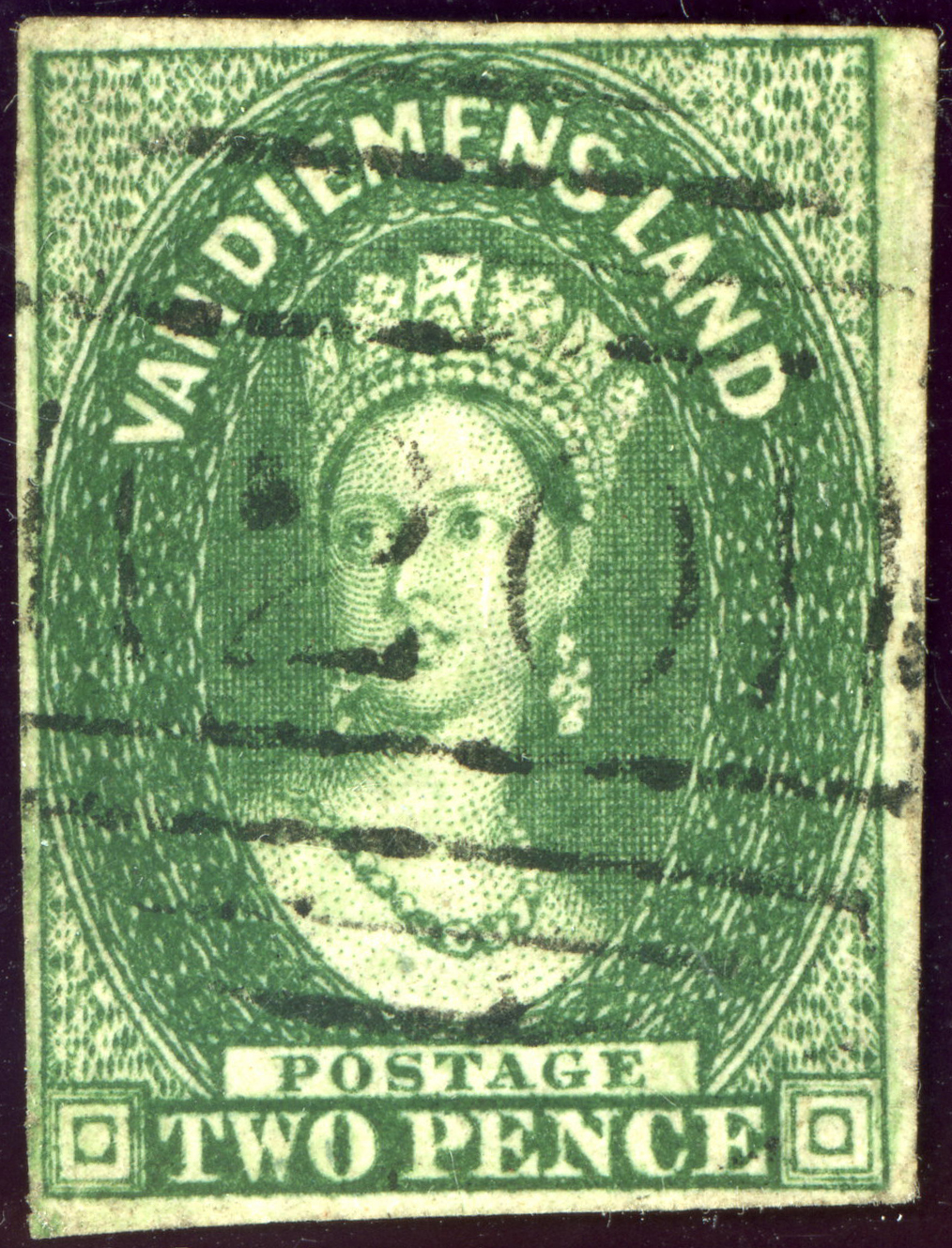
1855 2 pence green

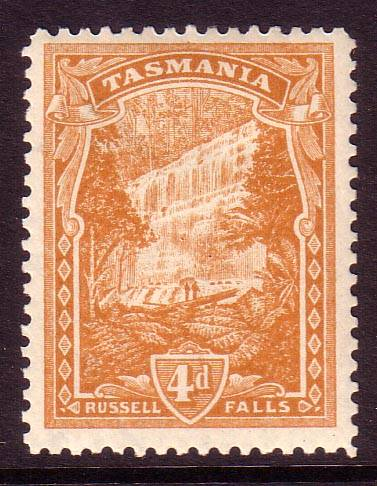
1899 pictorial 4 pence stamp, based on a painting of Russell Falls by Haughton Forrest

== See also ==
- Postage stamps and postal history of Australia
- Revenue stamps of Tasmania
