= Revenue stamps of Western Australia =

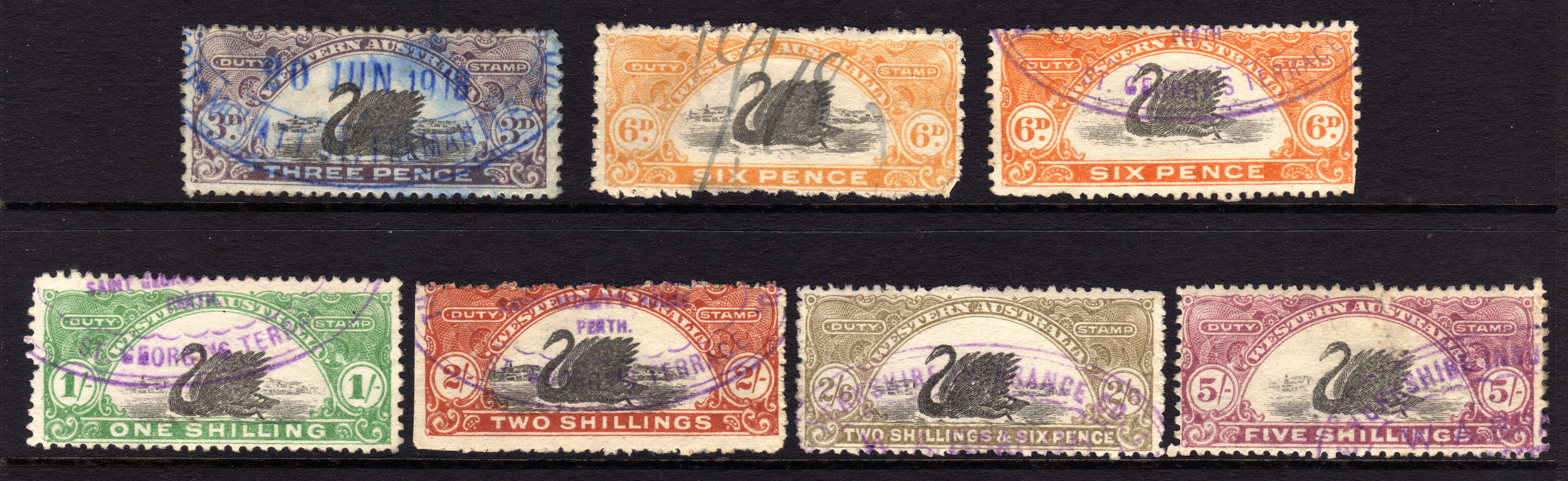
A selection of Western Australian stamp duty revenues

The Australian state of Western Australia issued revenue stamps from 1881 to 1973. There were various types for different taxes.

== Revenue ==
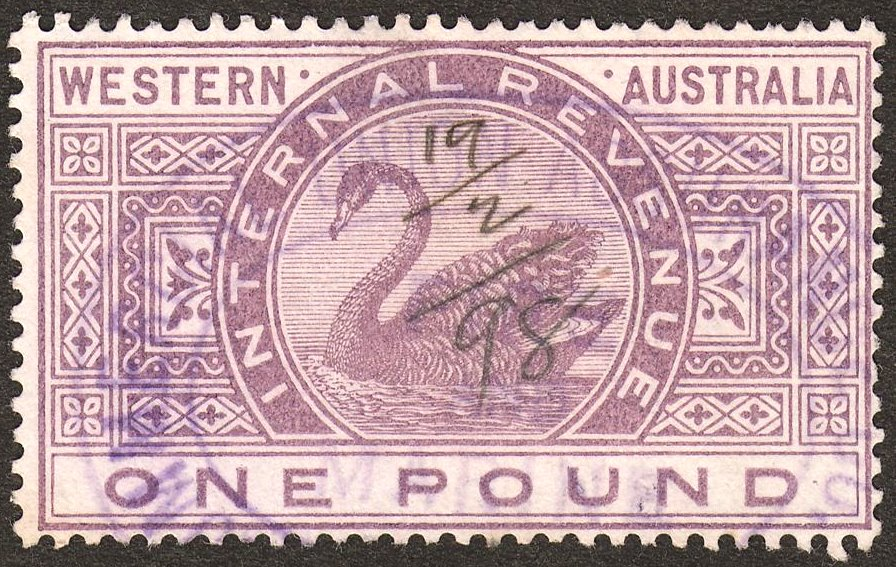
An 1898 Internal Revenue £1 stamp.

Western Australia's first general duty revenue stamps were postage stamps showing a black swan overprinted I R in 1881. A year later special printings of postage stamps in lilac were similarly overprinted, but this time they were also surcharged with a new value. These were replaced by a new set in a large format inscribed WESTERN AUSTRALIA INTERNAL REVENUE.

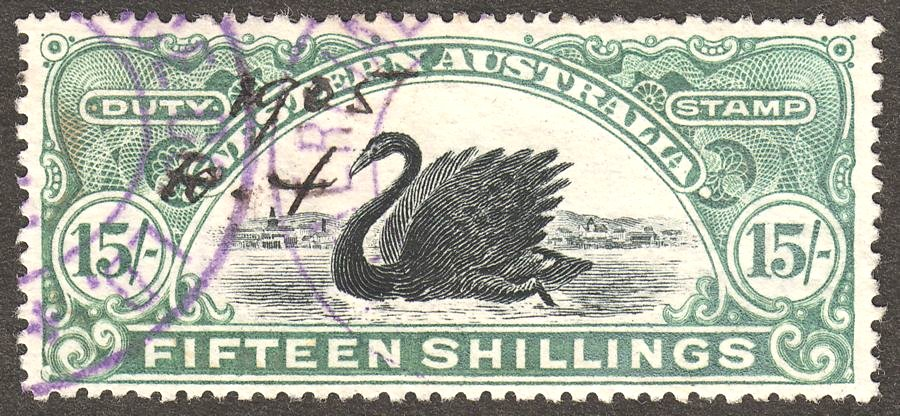
A 1905 Stamp Duty 15s stamp.

In 1904, the name of the tax was changed from "Internal Revenue" to "Stamp Duty". A new horizontal design again showing the swan was issued. This design remained in use for many years, resulting in many reprints which led to various changes in perforation, watermark, colours and plates.

In 1941, a new set was issued inscribed REVENUE DUTY W.A. This also showed the swan, but the design was now smaller. Initially five values from 1d to 1/- were issued, but new values continued to be issued, the highest being the £10 in 1951 and in 1963. This set remained in use until the Australian dollar was adopted in 1966. From that year until 1973, a large set of sixteen values from 1c to $50 was issued. Each value had a different wildlife design.

== Other adhesive revenues ==
"Internal Revenue" or "Revenue Duty" stamps were also overprinted for the following purposes:

- Cattle Sales Stamp Duty (1964)
- Probate Duty (1903-1905)
- Supreme Court (1903-1905)

In addition, special stamps were also used for several other purposes. These were:

- Beer Duty (1898-1906)
- Egg Stabilisation Charge (1940-1942)
- Financial Emergency Tax (1932-1940)
- Government Savings Bank Duty (1906)
- Hospital Fund (1930-1942)
- Pig Duty (1943-1966)
- Supreme Court Fees (1907-1922)
- Supreme Court Probate (1907-1925)
- Tax Instalment (1940-1941)

Apart from these, stamps were prepared to pay for fines by the Workers Home Board in 1912. However these were never issued and only mint copies from the printers' archives exist today.

== Impressed and imprinted stamps ==
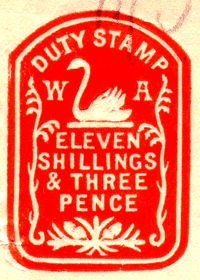
Impressed duty stamp for 11s/3d, circa 1907

Western Australia also had many impressed duty stamps. They started in 1881 and were initially colourless, with the embossing just leaving an impression on the document. Colourless embossed duty stamps remained in use for many years, and in the 1960s similar imprints denominated in cents were used. From 1905, impressed duty stamps in a 'tombstone' design in vermilion were also used. Many values exist, ranging from 1d to £500. Like their colourless counterparts, these were also reissued in decimal currency in 1966 when values from 10c to $1 were used.

Cheques also had directly printed imprints instead of embossed or impressed stamps from the 1950s onwards. Imprints were also used for betting duty and entertainments tax.

== See also ==
- Postage stamps and postal history of Western Australia
- Revenue stamps of Australia
