= H. Dormer Legge =

Major Harold Dormer Legge TD (21 October 1890 – 1982) was a British Army officer and philatelist specialising in the stamps of Australia.

Born in Ringmer, Sussex, he was the eldest child and only son of William Heneage Legge, a doctor, and Alice Mary Fawcus. He had four younger sisters. Legge was educated at Hurstpierpoint College and married Grace Emma La Trobe (1889–1976).

On 11 February 1915, Legge was promoted to 2nd Lieutenant. On 6 February 1926, Legge, a Lieutenant in the Royal Air Force, transferred to the 19th London Regiment. He rose to the rank of Major.

== Philately ==
In 1948, Legge published the first definitive study of the Australian Kangaroo and Map stamps, issued from 1913 to 1945, which is still studied today. He also published other works on Australian stamps.

== Publications ==
- The Kangaroo Issues of the stamps of the Commonwealth of Australia. Melbourne: Orlo Smith & Co., 1948.
- Commonwealth of Australia. The Line engraved issues of 1914, – and the essays, die and plate proofs of the Georgian 1d. Melbourne: Orlo Smith & Co., 1950.
- The 1913 Penny Kangaroo of Australia. London: Stanley Gibbons, 1979.
