= Postage stamps and postal history of Queensland =

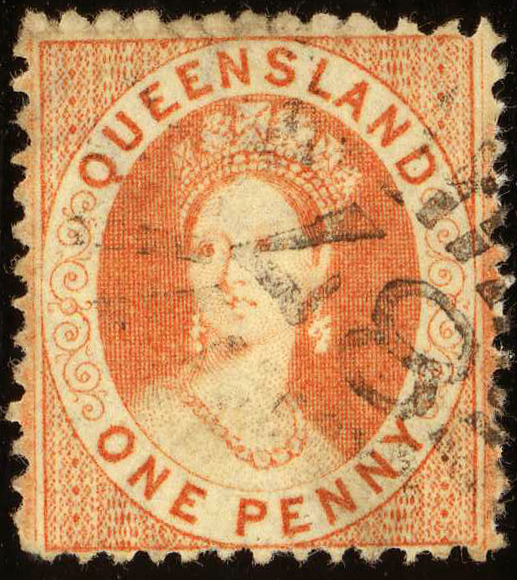
A 1868 stamp of Queensland, SG 59

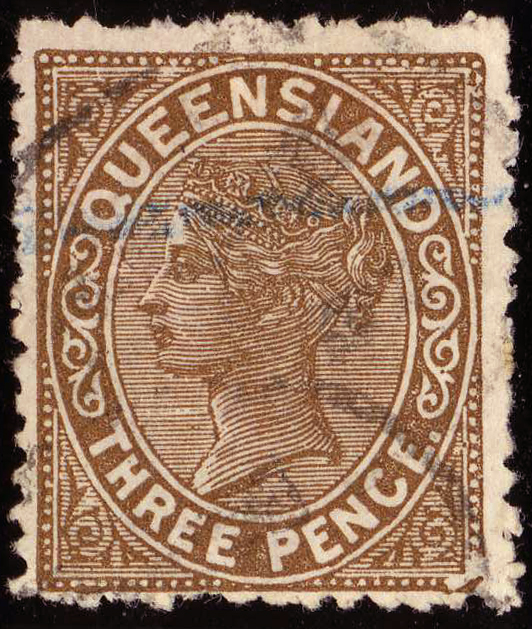
A 1890 stamp of Queensland, SG 192

This is a survey of the postage stamps and postal history of Queensland, a former British Crown Colony that is now part of Australia.

== First stamps ==
The first stamps of Queensland were issued on 1 November 1860. Before that, Queensland used the stamps of New South Wales from 1851. All of Queensland's postage stamps portrayed Queen Victoria with the exception of two stamps depicting allegorical figures of Australia (1903, 1907). Between 1 January 1880 and 1 July 1892, revenue stamps of 1866–1892 were authorised for postal use. In 1913, the stamps of Queensland were superseded by those of Australia.

A significant collection of Queensland stamps is held at the Queensland Museum.

== See also ==
- Postage stamps and postal history of Australia
- Revenue stamps of Queensland
