= Revenue stamps of Tasmania =

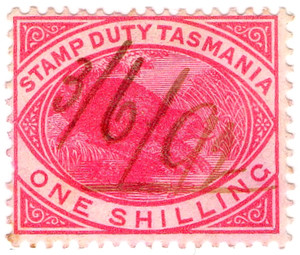
A stamp duty revenue stamp of Tasmania used in 1892

The Australian state of Tasmania issued adhesive revenue stamps from 1863 to 1998, although impressed stamps had appeared briefly in the 1820s. There were general revenue and stamp duty issues, as well as a number of specific issues for various taxes.

== Stamp duty and revenue issues ==
Tasmania's first set of revenue stamps was issued in 1863. Four values ranging from 3d to 10/- were issued, portraying Saint George and the Dragon. The initial issue was imperforate, but some unofficial perforations were done locally. Reissues of this design, with changes in the perforation, colour or paper, appeared between 1880 and 1888. In 1880, a new design showing a platypus was issued. Initially, four values ranging from 1d to 1/- were issued, but other values were added later. Throughout the 19th century, Tasmanian postage stamps were also valid for fiscal use, while the revenues were also accepted for postal use.

In 1900, a number of the platypus and St. George revenue issues, as well as £1 postage stamps portraying Queen Victoria, were overprinted REVENUE. These overprints were made since the newly formed Commonwealth of Australia, required the separation of state taxes from the new federal postal service. Between 1913 and 1918, some of these stamps were surcharged.

A numeral design was introduced in 1904, and this remained in use until 1952 with a variety of perforations and watermarks. A number of surcharges were also issued between 1907 and 1952. The platypus design of 1880 was reintroduced in 1929, when a 1d value was printed in the same design but from a new plate. Other values, including some surcharges, were issued later on from 1930 to 1940, and they remained in use alongside the numerals until the 1950s.

From 1955 onwards, a new set of pictorials with designs showing a platypus, King William pine, and heraldic lion with a pylon. These were reissued with some minor changes in the 1960s, until they were replaced by a decimal set in 1966. The new set had designs showing a Tasmanian devil, blue gum flower, and a pylon. Revenues were phased out in the 1990s and were withdrawn in about 1998.

== Other adhesive revenues ==
From 1 March 1880, stamps were issued to pay for beer duty. Many of these are quite rare as they were meant to be destroyed upon use. Tasmania continued to issue beer duty stamps in various designs until 1918. In 1920, beer duty stamps of Australia began to be used, replacing the state issues.

Between 1935 and 1937, various stamp duty numeral stamps were overprinted WAGES TAX. The overprint has two different settings, each exists in red and black. In 1940, some numeral or platypus stamps were overprinted TAX INSTALMENT, sometimes additionally surcharged, replacing the wages tax stamps. These are quite rare and many of the surviving stamps are believed to be archive copies from government records, not necessarily issued stamps. Another set of tax instalment stamps was issued in 1941. The set was a keytype that was used in all Australian states, and Tasmanian issues are identified by the abbreviation TAS. under the value. Twenty nine values ranging from 1d to £5 were issued, and they are most commonly found in mint condition.

== Impressed and imprinted stamps ==
Circular handstamps showing the payment of newspaper duty were used in Tasmania (then known as Van Diemen's Land) between 1827 and 1829. Different circular handstamps were used to pay the stamp duty on cheques or receipts in 1865.

Tasmania used impressed duty stamps from 1867 onwards. The first issues were colourless, with the embossing just leaving an impression on the document. In 1882 stamps leaving an impression in vermilion were introduced, although the colourless embossed stamps still remained in use. Over the years, several designs were used, including various types of numerals and a design showing a platypus. Many values exist, ranging from ½d to £1000. In 1966, impressed duty stamps were issued in decimal currency, in both colourless and vermilion versions. Values range from 1c to $4000.

Cheques also had directly printed imprints instead of embossed or impressed stamps from the 1940s onwards. Imprints were also used for gaming tax and entertainments tax.

== See also ==
- Postage stamps and postal history of Tasmania
- Revenue stamps of Australia
