= Postage stamps and postal history of Victoria =

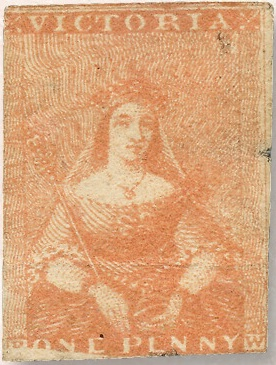
First Victoria stamp in Australia (1850)

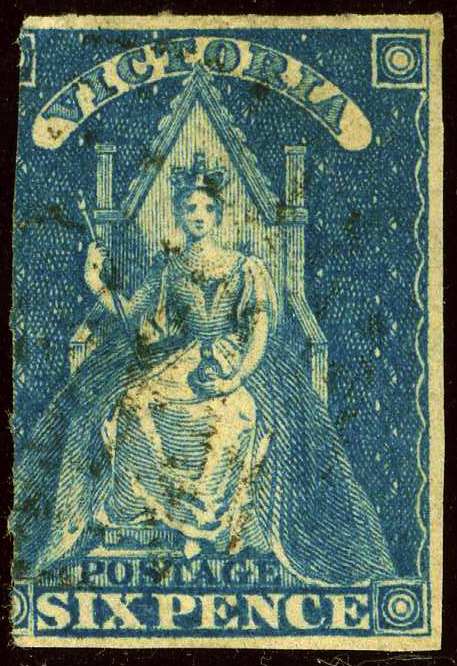
A 6d stamp of 1858 showing Queen Victoria on the Coronation chair

Victoria, a state of Australia and until 1901 a British colony, was still under the control of New South Wales when its first post office was opened in Melbourne in April 1837. Post offices opened at Geelong and Portland soon after, and by 1850 there were forty-five post offices.

== First stamps ==
Victoria's first postage stamps appeared on 9 January 1850. They were engraved and lithographed locally by Thomas Ham of Melbourne, and featured a half-length portrait of Queen Victoria seated, holding orb and scepter. There were three values: 1d in orange-vermilion, 2d in lilac-mauve, and 3d in blue. The dyes were altered several times during printing, yielding dozens of minor variations.

Damage to the 2d die prompted Ham to produce a new design, this time showing a full-length portrait of the queen seated on the Coronation Chair (although the design is traditionally described as "queen on throne"). As with the first design, many varieties and shades are known.

With the exception of a Perkins Bacon version of "queen on throne" in 1856, subsequent designs reverted to the profile bust typical of British stamps of the time. Multiple designs, colors, papers, perforations, and watermarks resulted in a large number of different stamps; Stanley Gibbons identifies nearly 200 types issued between 1854 and 1883 alone.

The Postage Act 1883 made postage, duty, and fee stamps interchangeable, and as a result, the government decided to issue only one type of stamp subsequently. More types of duty stamp dies were available than any other, so from that point new issues were all inscribed "STAMP DUTY". As they continued to be used as revenue stamps, high values were printed, up to 100 pounds. The stamp duty inscription was dropped in 1896.

Victoria issued semi-postal stamps in 1897 and 1901, in the first instance the extra income went to a hospital fund, and in the second, to a Boer War Patriotic Fund.

Like the other colonies, after federation Victoria continued to issue its own stamps. In 1901, King Edward VII made an appearance on the £1 and £2 stamps. The stamps of Victoria were superseded by those of the Commonwealth in 1913.

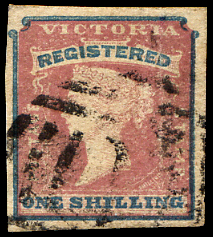
A Registered mail stamp, December 1854

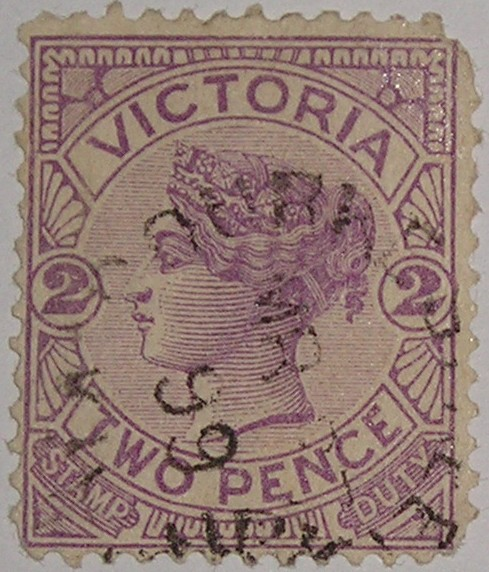
A 2d stamp of an 1885 design, inscribed "STAMP DUTY" and used in 1899

== See also ==
- Postage stamps and postal history of Australia
- Revenue stamps of Victoria

== References and sources ==
Sources

- Stanley Gibbons Ltd: various catalogues
