= Revenue stamps of the Australian Capital Territory =

The 5c stamp from the first issue

The Australian Capital Territory issued revenue stamps from 1966 to 1983 for stamp duty. The first issue had the coat of arms of the territory and had ten values ranging from 5c to $10 in various colours. The second issue was a set of three similar to the first but without watermark. There might have been a conveyance issue in 1990 but no examples have been recorded.

== See also ==
- Revenue stamps of Australia
