= Revenue stamps of New South Wales =

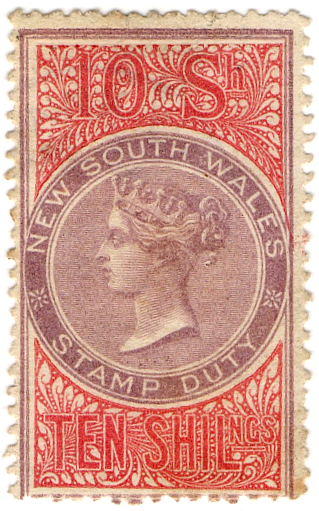
A ten shilling stamp duty revenue stamp of New South Wales

The Australian state of New South Wales issued revenue stamps from 1865 to 1998. There were various types for different taxes.

== Beer Duty (c.1887−1903) ==
These were affixed to beer kegs, casks or crates and were normally destroyed in use. Therefore, most examples that exist are mint remainders and none are common. In some cases there might be no surviving copies from an issue. The first issue was triangular, and was followed by a rectangular design in 1889. Stamps in similar designs continued to be used until they were replaced by Australian issues in 1918.

== Cattle Duty (1951−c.1980) ==
This tax was to compensate farmers who had diseased cattle killed for health reasons. The original issue had eleven values ranging from 1d to £10, and in 1966 a new issue in the same design but in decimal currency was issued, with values from 5c to $20. Reprints were made in the 1980s.

== Corporate Affairs Commission (1966−1981) ==
These stamps replaced Registrar of Companies stamps. Only two were issued, the $3 and $6 stamp duty revenues overprinted. Both are scarce and were withdrawn in 1981.

== Family Endowment (1932) ==
The only set of family endowment stamps were stamp duty numeral types with a very faint overprint in pale green. Twenty one values were issued, ranging from 5d to £100. These are rare since the overprint dissolves in water, so it is very difficult to remove them from their original document.

== Registrar of Companies (1961−1966) ==
All stamps for this tax were stamp duty revenues overprinted REGISTRAR GENERAL or REGISTRAR COMPANIES. Only three different stamps were issued and all are scarce. These stamps were replaced by Corporate Affairs Commission stamps in 1966.

== Relief Tax (c.1930−1933) ==
The only set of relief tax stamps were stamp duty numeral types with overprinted. Twenty one values were issued, ranging from 1d to £100. A number of varieties are known to exist, and they were replaced by wages tax stamps in 1933.

== Stamp Duty (1865−1998) ==
The first stamp duty revenues were issued in 1865 portraying Queen Victoria. Until 1901, a number of sets were issued, all portraying Queen Victoria but with many different designs. In 1909 a new set portraying King Edward VII was issued, and numeral types were first issued in 1917. In 1929 a new set of numerals was issued, replacing the previous sets. This set continued in use until it was replaced by a new set in decimal currency in 1966. This set continued to be used until 1998. Stamp Duty revenues were sometimes overprinted for other taxes as well.

== Swine Duty (1928−1966) ==
This tax was to compensate farmers whose pigs died or were destroyed by swine fever. The first set consisted of five values ranging from 1s to 20s from the King Edward VII stamp duty issue overprinted. In 1930 a new design was issued with values from 6d to £5, and this was reissued in 1966 in decimal currency, with values ranging from 10c to $10.

== Tax Instalment (1941) ==
These replaced Unemployment Relief Tax and Social Services Tax stamps. Only one set of tax instalment stamps was issued, in 1941. It was the keytype used in all Australian states, overprinted N.S.W. below the value. Twenty nine values ranging from 1d to £5 were issued, and are most commonly found in mint condition.

== Unemployment Relief Tax and Social Services Tax (1939−1941) ==
These replaced Wages Tax stamps. The first issue consisted of earlier Wages Tax stamps overprinted, and designs similar to them but with the new inscription were issued between 1940 and 1941. These were replaced by Tax Instalment stamps later that year.

== Wages Tax (1933−1939) ==
Wages Tax stamps were cut in half upon use, so they are quite rare as whole stamps. The first set was issued in 1933, and all later issues were the first issue with security overprints indicating the year of use. They were replaced by Unemployment Relief Tax and Social Services Tax in 1939.

== See also ==
- Postage stamps and postal history of New South Wales
- Revenue stamps of Australia
