= Haughton Forrest =

Australian artist (1826–1925)

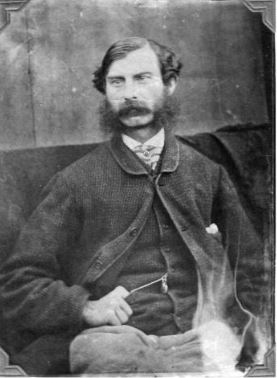
Haughton Forrest (1860s)

Haughton Forrest (30 December 1826, Boulogne-sur-Mer – 20 January 1925, Melton Mowbray), sometimes incorrectly referred to as James Haughton Forrest, was an Australian artist who specialized in landscapes and maritime scenes.

== Biography ==
He was one of ten children born to a military family. His father, Thomas, was an equerry to Queen Victoria. It is not clear why the family was in France, but they lived there until 1830, when the July Revolution forced them to leave. After travelling a bit, they settled in Jamaica, where his father owned sugar plantations. He attended the Manning's School in Jamaica and continued at a military academy in Wiesbaden.

In 1852, he obtained a commission in the Honourable Artillery Company of London and later in the 31st Royal Monmouth Light Infantry. After advancing to the rank of captain, he resigned his commission to take a civil service position with the British Post Office. In 1858, he married a widow, Henrietta Bunce (1824-1893). They had two sons, one of whom died in infancy, and two daughters. Shortly after the wedding, they settled in southern England, where he sailed and began painting. There is no record of an education in the arts, so it may be assumed that he was self-taught.

In 1875, perhaps trying to emulate his father's career as a planter, he took up a land grant in Kittoland, an English settlement in the state of Paraná, Brazil, but found the environment unamenable. The following year, he took up a similar land grant in northeastern Tasmania on the Ringarooma River. He soon abandoned that enterprise too, moving to Sorell, where he held a number of municipal positions including Bailiff of Crown Lands, Inspector of Nuisances and Superintendent of Police. In 1881, he surrendered all of those offices and moved to Wellington Hamlets, a suburb of Hobart, to devote himself entirely to art.

In 1899, his views of Mount Wellington and Hobart, some based on photographs by John Watt Beattie, were chosen for Australia's first set of pictorial stamps. In the course of an almost seventy-year career, he produced over 3,000 paintings in various formats and media. His estate was very modest and it is only in recent years that interest in his paintings has revived.

== Selected works ==
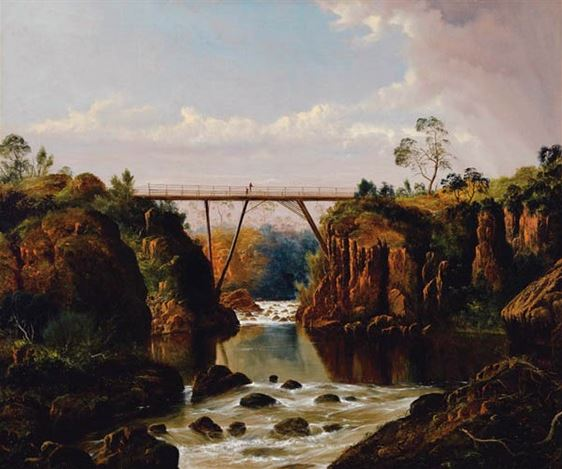
The Bridge at Corra Lynn Corra Lynn, Tasmania

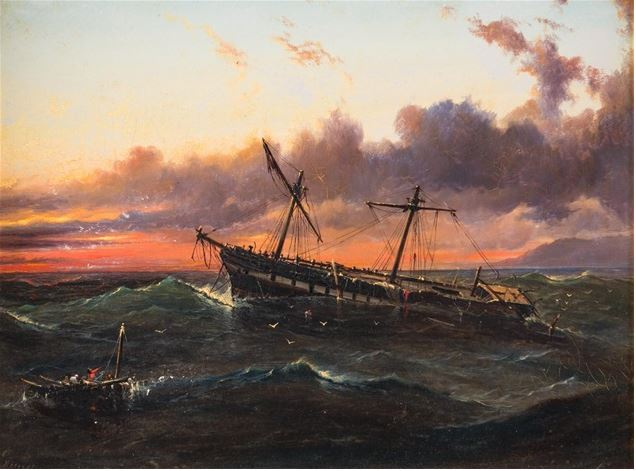
The Queen of the South,
off Bruny Island

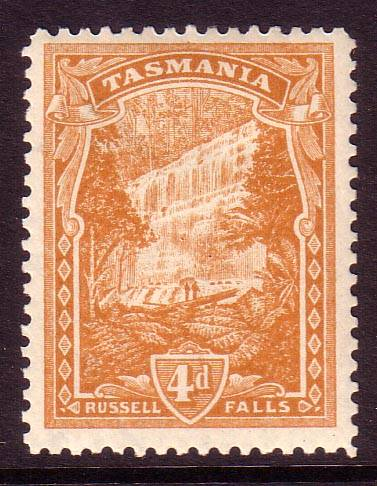
4 pence stamp from 1889 depicting Russell Falls

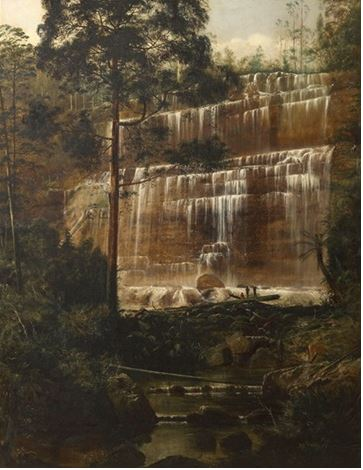
The original painting

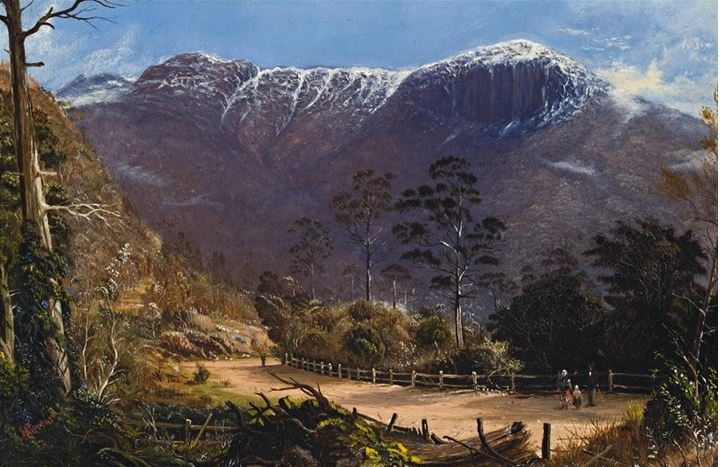
Strickland Avenue, Hobart, with Mount Wellington
