= Revenue stamps of the Northern Territory =

Australian revenue stamp

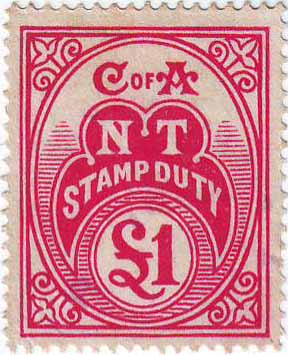
A £1 revenue stamp of the Northern Territory

The Australian territory of Northern Territory, known as North Australia between 1929 and 1935, issued revenue stamps from 1917 to 2006.

== Stamp duty (1917-2006) ==
The first issue for stamp duty was issued in 1917. This consisted of six values ranging from 1d to £1, and was used until it was replaced by the North Australia issue in 1929. This consisted of three values of 1d, 6d and 1s. In 1935, revenues of the Northern Territory were reintroduced in the same design as the 1917 issue but with a different watermark. Stamps in this design continued to be used until 1978 with various changes in currency and design. In 1989 a new set depicting wildlife, with values ranging from 50c to $100, was issued, and it remained in use until 2006.

== Tax instalment (1941) ==
Only one set of tax instalment stamps was issued, in 1941. It was the keytype used in all Australian states, overprinted N.T. below the value. Twenty nine values ranging from 1d to £2 were issued, and are most commonly found in mint condition.

== See also ==
- Revenue stamps of Australia
