= Postage stamps and postal history of Western Australia =

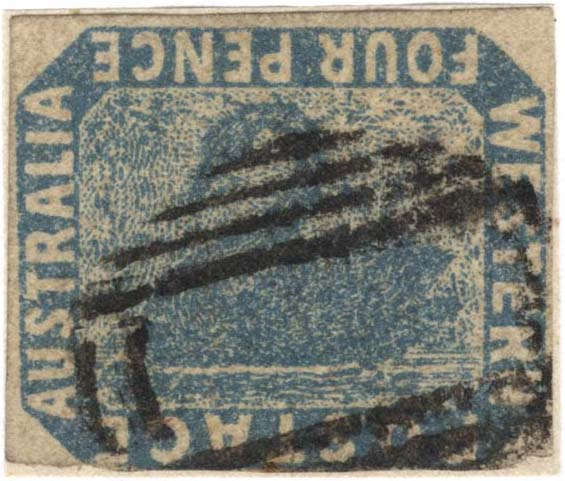
The 1855 Inverted Swan

Western Australia, a state of Australia and formerly a British colony, established its postal service soon after the British settled in 1829; in December of that year, Fremantle's harbourmaster was appointed postmaster. A post office in Albany, Western Australia opened on 14 October 1834, and the main post office moved to Perth, in 1835.

== First stamps ==
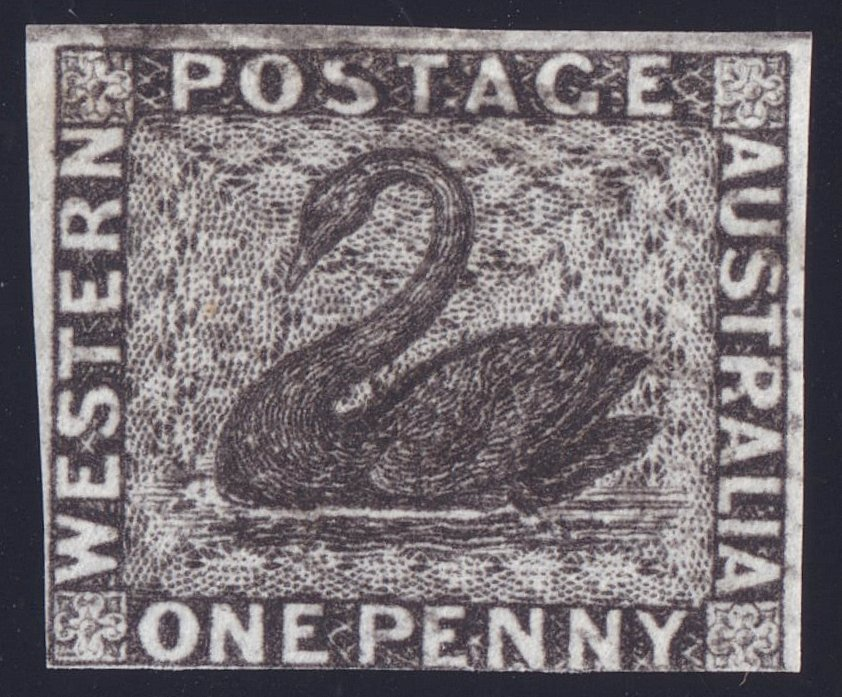
This 1d Black Swan stamp was the first one issued in Western Australia.

The colony issued its first postage stamp on 1 August 1854. The 1d black stamp featured the black swan, a design used for most of the colony's later stamps as well. This stamp was engraved in England and printed by Perkins Bacon; later in the year, local lithographer Horace Samson produced 4d and 1sh values by taking an impression of the 1d's swan vignette and adding different frames. Alfred Hillman's mistake in the repair of the printing stones in 1855 resulted in the frame being inverted, yielding the extremely rare Inverted Swan error. In 1927 the locations of the nine known copies were listed in the Brisbane Telegraph. 1 - Collection of the Royal Family of Windsor. 2 - Tapling collection, British Museum. 3 - Leinster collection, Dublin Science and Art Museum. 4 - White collection, State Library of New South Wales. 5 - EH Collins. 6 - PR England. 7 - Dr HA James. 8 - JA Nix. 9 - L Meinertzhagen.

== Later issues ==
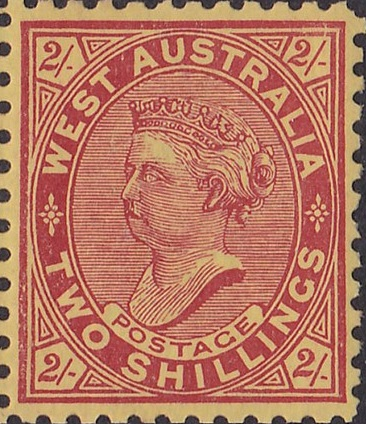
"West Australia" two shillings issued in 1902

In 1857, Hillman produced 2d and 6d values of the swan design by imitating the existing stamps, though with the swan on a blank background, but these were only used until 1860 when Perkins Bacon plates of the 1854 design were used in Perth to print all values.

A new swan design, for the 3d value, appeared in 1872, and variations on it finally superseded the 1854 design starting in 1885, with a definitive series of eight values.

After federation, the states continued to operate their postal systems, and 1902 saw a new series of swan definitives, along with stamps depicting Queen Victoria for the first time, on the values from 2 shillings to 1 pound. The Victorian stamps are also unusual in having the inscription read "WEST AUSTRALIA" instead of "WESTERN AUSTRALIA" as was the norm. These stamps continued in daily use until Commonwealth stamps were issued in 1913.

== See also ==
- Postage stamps and postal history of Australia
- Revenue stamps of Western Australia

== References and sources ==
Sources

- Stanley Gibbons Ltd: various catalogues
