= Section 51(v) of the Constitution of Australia =

Section 51(v) of the Constitution of Australia (commonly referred as the post and telegraph power) is a subsection of Section 51 of the Constitution of Australia that gives the Australian Parliament power to legislate on "postal, telegraphic, telephonic, and other like services".

== Postal services ==
In 1901, one of the first Acts of the federal parliament was the Post and Telegraph Act 1901, relying on Section 51(v). The Act created the Postmaster-General's Department (PMG) which took over the colonial mail systems. The PMG was responsible for telegraphic and domestic telephone operations as well as postal mail.

In 1975 the Postmaster-General's Department was separated into the Australian Telecommunications Commission (now Telstra) which was responsible for telephone services, and the Australian Postal Commission (now Australia Post) which was responsible for postal services.

The power also supports the issue of Australian postal stamps.

== Telephonic services ==
The power has supported Australia’s regulatory environment for telecommunications in Australia, such as the telecommunications part of the Trade Practices Act. (See Communications in Australia.)

== “Other like services” ==
The most problematic part of this power has been the words “other like services”. The High Court has taken a flexible approach to interpreting this provision that has recognised that technology has changed since the constitution was written.

In the case of R v Brislan, in 1935, the High Court decided that s.51(v) included the power to regulate radio broadcasting. However, in Brislan four of the judges held radio to be a wireless type of ‘telegraphic or telephonic service’, rather than an ‘other like service’.

In the 1965 case of Jones v Commonwealth (No 2), the High Court found that television broadcasting also fell under the ambit of s.51(v). Although the communications power is often presumed to apply broadly as new technologies arise, it is uncertain, in the absence of litigation, whether Commonwealth regulation will be supported. For example, it is unclear whether regulation of internet content would be supported under s.51(v).

The Commonwealth has already relied on s.51(v) to regulate parts of the internet. For example, the Interactive Gambling Act (Cth), which regulates the operation of online casinos within Australia and advertising of online gambling, was based on s.51(v). Other forms of gambling are a state and territory responsibility.

In March 2013 Australia's accession to the Council of Europe's Budapest Convention on Cybercrime came into force following the Cybercrime Legislation Amendment Act 2012 (Cth). The amendments to the Criminal Code which removed the earlier "carriage service" (telephone and internet) elements of some computer offences (in part 10.7) were apparently supported by the s.51(xxix) external affairs power (arising from obligations under an international treaty). This may mean that ratification of the Convention extended the Commonwealth power in this area beyond the s.51(v) power, avoiding the need to rely on the definition of 'other like services'.
