= South Australian stamp overprints =

The colony of South Australia began issuing postage stamps in 1855, and continued until the first stamps of the Australian Commonwealth were issued in 1913. Many of these stamps were intended for use on official mail by government departments, and were overprinted with various initials to prevent unofficial usage by staff and to identify the department concerned. The overprints were in use from 1 April 1868 until 1874, when they were replaced by the letters "O.S." which was then used on official mail of South Australia. Red and black were the most common colours for overprints, but blue was also used.

== List of overprints ==
The initials and the relevant departments were:

- A. Architect
- A.G. Attorney General
- A.O. Audit Office
- B.D. Barracks Department
- B.G. Botanical Gardens
- B.M. Bench of Magistrates
- C. Customs
- C.D. Convict Department
- C.L. Crown Lands
- C.O. Commissariat Office
- C.P. Commissioner of Police
- C.S. Chief Secretary
- C.Sgn. Colonial Surgeon
- D.B. Destitute Board
- D.R Deeds Registration
- E. Engineer
- E.B. Education Board
- G.F. Gold Fields
- G.P. Government Printer
- G.S. Government Storekeeper
- G.T. Goolwa Tramway
- H. Hospitals
- H.A. House of Assembly
- I.A. Immigration Agent
- I.E. Intestate Estates
- I.S. Inspector of Sheep
- L.A. Lunatic Asylum
- L.C. Legislative Council
- L.L. Legislative Librarian
- L.T. Land Titles
- M. Military
- M.B. Marine Board
- M.R. Manager of Railways
- M.R.G. Main Roads, Gambiertown
- N.T. Northern Territory
- O.A. Official Assignee
- P. Police
- P.A. Protector of Aborigines
- P.O. Post Office
- P.S. Private Secretary
- P.W. Public Works
- R.B. Road Board
- R.G. Registrar General
- S. Sheriff
- S.C. Supreme Court
- S.G. Surveyor General
- S.M. Stipendiary Magistrate
- S.T. Superintendent of Telegraphs
- T. Treasury
- T.R. Titles Registration
- V. Volunteers
- VA. Valuer of Runs
- Vn. Vaccination
- W. Waterworks

== See also ==
- Postage stamps and postal history of South Australia

== Sources ==
- The Australian Stamp Catalogue, 1976, Stamp Publications, Dubbo, NSW, Australia.
- Stamps of the World, 1980. Stanley Gibbons, London, UK.
- South Australia Study Circle
