= List of postage rates in Australia =

== Postage rate ==
=== Basic domestic ===
The basic postage rate for a small letter has increased over the years due to inflation but influenced in recent years by a complex interplay between Australia Post's monopoly over small items, and need to provide service to all Australian addresses at the mandated basic rate.

In July 2009, Australia Post requested the Australian Competition and Consumer Commission (ACCC) to approve a stamp price rise in 2010 from 55 cents to 60 cents but the ACCC declined the approval of the price rise, however in April 2010, Australia Post resubmitted the proposed postal stamp rise. The ACCC approved this request on 28 May 2010 and it was published in the Government Gazette on 9 June 2010.

On 26 December 2013, due to the heavy decline in mail usage due to competition from email, Australia Post requested an increase in the base rate to 70 cents.

On 4 January 2016, due to the heavy decline in mail usage due to competition from email, Australia Post requested an increase in the base rate to $1.00.

On 1 February 2020, the base rate for domestic letters became $1.10.

The base rate for domestic letters has been $1.70 since 17 July 2025.

PR   INF    YEAR
1d – 1.20 - 1911
3d – 2.50 - 1950 (Equals 2.50¢)
5d – 4.22 - 1959 (Equals 4.17¢)
4¢ – 4.93 - 1966 (Introduction of decimal currency)[9]
5¢ – 5.10 - 1967
6¢ – 5.59 - 1970
7¢ – 5.93 - 1971
10¢ – 7.91 - 1974
18¢ – 9.11 - 1975
20¢ – 12.52 - 1978
22¢ – 15.04 - 1980
24¢ – 16.47 - 1981
27¢ – 18.35 - 1982
30¢ – 20.18 - 1983
36¢ – 24.44 - 1986
37¢ – 26.51 - 1987
39¢ – 28.42 - 1988
 
41¢ – 20.55 - 1989[10]
43¢ – 32.78 - 1990 (effective 3 September 1990)
45¢ – 34.17 - 1992 (effective 2 January 1992)[11]
45¢ – 52.42 - 2000 (effective 1 July 2000. With the introduction of the GST, the postage component was decreased to absorb the new GST cost, so for the public there was no change in stamp prices. For businesses the GST claimable component of the postage rate was 4¢, leaving a reduced cost to business users of just 41¢.
50¢ – 45.10 - 2003 (effective 13 January 2003)[12]
55¢ – 52.42 - 2008 (effective 1 September 2008)
60¢ – 54.91 - 2010 (effective 28 June 2010)
70¢ – 60.61 - 2014 (effective 31 March 2014)[13]
$1.00 – 62.32 - 2016 (effective 4 January 2016)[6]
$1.10 – 66.27 - 2020 (effective 1 February 2020)[7]
$1.20 - ??.?? - 2023 (effective 3 January 2023)[14]
$1.50 - ??.?? - 2024 (effective 3 April 2024)[15]
$1.70 - ??.?? - 2025 (effective 17 July 2025)[16]

=== Large letters ===
Since about 2005, larger letters have been charged a round multiple of the base postage rate, which is helpful to customers if they do not have stocks of the more expensive stamps.

- 260 mm × 360 mm × 20 mm (10.24 in × 14.17 in × 0.79 in) – up to 125 g (4.4 oz) – A$3.40
- 260 x 360 x 20mm – Up to 250g – $5.10
- 260 x 360 x 20mm – Up to 500g – $8.50

A large letter, including packaging, cannot be more than 20 millimetres (0.79 in) thick nor larger than 260 by 360 millimetres (10 in × 14 in), otherwise it will be considered a parcel, which as of 2024 costs a minimum of A$9.70 for up to 250 grams (8.8 oz).

== Priority Labels ==
These are added to the envelope in addition to the normal postage stamps, costing $1.00 as of 2025.
