= Revenue stamps of the Malay States =

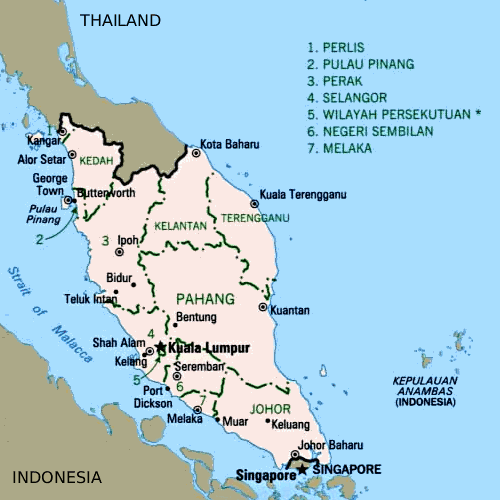
Map of the peninsular Malay States

Over the years various Malay States issued their own revenue stamps. Now most states use Malaysian revenue stamps, except for Singapore which is independent and no longer uses revenue stamps.

== Johore ==
Johore first issued revenues in 1904. From that year until 1922, of postage stamps showing Sultan Ibrahim were overprinted JUDICIAL for court use. These stamps are known with a number of different watermarks as they were in use for almost 20 years. At the same time, postage stamps were used for other non-judicial fiscal needs, and until the 1920s there were various postage stamps with high values that were intended for fiscal use only.

During the Japanese occupation in World War II, pre-war dual-purpose postage-and-revenue stamps of Johore were overprinted DAI NIPPON 2602 and were issued as revenues in 1942–43. Some of these were also surcharged with new values or were further overprinted with a handstamp in Japanese.

The only post-war revenue issues appeared in 1950 when a set of three high values of $25, $50 and $100 was issued showing the Sultan Abu Bakar State Mosque.

== Kedah ==
Kedah's first revenues were three high values of $25, $100 and $250 issued in 1929 showing the Council Chamber building. For lower amounts dual-purpose postage and revenue stamps were used for fiscal needs. These were replaced by another set showing Sultan Abdul Hamid Halim in 1937 with the values of $25, $100 and $500.

During the Japanese occupation, pre-war dual-purpose stamps were overprinted DAI NIPPON 2602, and they are known used both fiscally and for postal purposes. Kedah was ceded to Thailand in 1943 and renamed Syburi, and a single revenue stamp depicting the state's coat of arms and inscribed with the new name was issued in 1945.

In 1950, when it was part of the Federation of Malaya, Kedah issued its last revenue stamps showing Sultan Badlishah with the values of $25, $100 and $250.

== Kelantan ==
Kelantan issued very few revenue stamps. A single $25 value showing Sultan Ismail was issued in 1937.

When Kelantan was occupied by Japan, various stamps postage were overprinted FISCAL to be used exclusively for revenue purposes in 1942–43. This overprint was applied to a wide range of issues, including stamps of the Japanese occupation of Kelantan (themselves overprinted on pre-war Kelantan postage-and-revenue stamps) and on general issues for Japanese Malaya (themselves overprinted on pre-war issues of the Straits Settlements and various other states).

After the Japanese transferred control of Kelantan to Thailand, a set of revenue stamps depicting the state's coat of arms and inscribed in Jawi was issued in 1944–45. A second set depicting the new sultan Ibrahim IV and inscribed in Thai, Jawi and English was also issued in 1944–45.

In 1950 another three values of $25, $100 and $250 were issued once again showing Ibrahim IV and an agricultural scene with a buffalo plough.

== Malacca ==
Until 1942 Malacca was part of the Straits Settlements and used their revenue stamps. Its only revenues were a set of three "Nyasaland" keytype high values issued in 1950 showing King George VI.

== Negri Sembilan ==
Negri Sembilan's first revenues were Sungei Ujong revenues overprinted JUDICIAL N.S. and further surcharged, for use in law courts. Around 1891 Straits Settlements revenues were overprinted with the name of the state for other non-judicial purposes, while postage stamps were overprinted J or JUDICIAL or further surcharged around 1900. In the meantime dual-purpose postage & revenue stamps were used fiscally, and then Federated Malay States revenues were used. Between 1936 and 1939 high values of $25 and $100 showing elephants were issued. A set of three $25, $100 and $250 values was issued between in 1950 again showing elephants.

== Pahang ==
Pahang's first revenue stamps were issued around 1890. The first series consisted of Straits Settlements revenues overprinted PAHANG in two different formats. Dual-purpose postage & revenue stamps were later used for fiscal purposes, and from around 1900 Federated Malay States revenues were used. In 1903 Perak postage stamps were issued overprinted $50 Pahang for use as a fiscal, but FMS revenues also remained in use. In 1936 a $25 value showing elephants was issued.

In 1944–45, during the Japanese occupation, various pre-war stamps were handstamped Dai Nippon 2602 Malaya for use as revenues in Pahang. The overprint was applied to the $25 Pahang revenue stamp issued in 1936, as well as to postage-and-revenue stamps of the Straits Settlements and the states of Kedah, Perak and Selangor.

A set of three $25, $100 and $250 values was issued in 1950 showing Sultan Abu Bakar.

== Penang ==
Prior to World War II Penang was part of the Straits Settlements and used their revenue stamps. In 1942, during the Japanese occupation, pre-war postage-and-revenue stamps of the Straits Settlements were overprinted with the seal of Akira Okugawa (Chief of the Treasury section of Penang) or DAI NIPPON 2602 PENANG, and these were used for both revenue and postal purposes. High value Straits Settlements revenues overprinted with the Okugawa seal, along with lower value dual-purpose stamps overprinted with a different Okugawa seal, were issued solely for fiscal use in Penang in 1942–43.

After the war, Penang issued a set of three "Nyasaland" keytype stamps showing King George VI in 1949.

== Perak ==
From 1880 to 1892 various judicial or revenue stamps of the Straits Settlements were overprinted PERAK in a wide range of styles and fonts. From 1896 to 1899 postage stamps showing tigers or elephants were overprinted Judicial or JUDICIAL while dual-purpose postage & revenue stamps were used for other fiscal purposes. In 1900 a postage stamp was issued overprinted Three Cents Revenue only for fiscal use, and later that year Federated Malay States revenues began to be used. Between 1936 and 1939 high values of $25 and $100 showing elephants were issued.

While occupied by Japan, Perak issued a single stamp showing a map of the Malayan Peninsula with the state of Perak highlighted and the flag of Japan over it. The stamp was issued in 1943 with a red border around the rouletting, and in 1944–45 it was reissued without this border. Non-adhesive revenues inscribed Perak Shu Seicho Stamp Fees Paid were also used during the Japanese occupation.

Between 1949 and 1952, a set of three $25, $100 and $250 values was also issued, once again showing elephants.

== Perlis ==
Perlis' only revenues were a set of three values issued in 1951 showing the Syed Alwi State Mosque in Kangar.

== Selangor ==
Selangor's first revenue stamps were issued around 1880. The first series consisted of Straits Settlements large format revenues overprinted SELANGOR reading up. The Straits Settlements issued a new set of revenues in 1882, and these were also issued with Selangor overprints between 1884 and 1891. At least thirteen different types of the overprint are known to exist. Between 1897 and 1902 postage stamps of Selangor were also overprinted J or JUDICIAL for use in courts. In the meantime, dual-purpose postage & revenue stamps were then used for non-judicial fiscal purposes, and from around 1900 Federated Malay States revenues were used. Between 1936 and 1939 high values of $25 and $100 showing elephants were issued.

Between 1942 and 1945, while under Japanese occupation, Selangor issued a wide variety of revenue stamps by overprinting various issues with the Japanese word for "Tax", 税. This overprint was applied to pre-war dual-purpose or revenue-only stamps of Selangor itself, as well as to pre-war dual-purpose stamps of the Straits Settlements and various other states, pre-war revenue stamps of the Federated Malay States and various other states, and to postage stamps issued during the Japanese occupation (themselves overprinted on a wide variety of pre-war stamps of Selangor itself, the Straits Settlements or various states).

A final set of three $25, $100 and $250 values was issued in 1950 showing Sultan Hisamuddin Alam Shah.

== Singapore ==
Until 1942 Singapore was part of the Straits Settlements and used their revenue stamps. Its first revenues were a set of three "Nyasaland" keytype high values issued between 1948 and 1953 showing King George VI. These were reissued with the portrait of Queen Elizabeth II between 1954 and 1964. Singapore also issued various entertainments duty stamps to pay the tax on cinema tickets between 1955 and 1965. Singapore left Malaysia in 1965 and continued to issue its own revenue stamps independently until they were withdrawn in 1999.

== Sungei Ujong ==
Sungei Ujong's first revenue stamps were issued around 1880. The first series consisted of Straits Settlements large format revenues overprinted SUNGEI UJONG in one line reading down. The Straits Settlements issued a new set of revenues in 1882, and these were also issued with Sungei Ujong overprints between 1884 and 1890. At least five different types of the overprint are known to exist. In 1893, postage stamps showing a leaping tiger were overprinted JUDICIAL for use in courts. Sungei Ujong became part of Negri Sembilan in 1896.

== Trengganu ==
Trengganu initially used dual-purpose postage and revenue stamps for fiscal purposes, and like some other states it had high values solely intended for revenue use. During the Japanese occupation, various dual-purpose postage-and-revenue stamps were overprinted FISCAL restricting them to revenue use. When the Japanese gave Trengganu to Thailand a set of stamps showing a sailing boat was issued in 1944–45.

In 1950 a set of three stamps showing a traditional fishing boat were issued.

== See also ==
- Revenue stamps of Malaysia
- Revenue stamps of North Borneo
- Revenue stamps of Sarawak
- Revenue stamps of Singapore
- Postage stamps and postal history of Malaysia
