= Revenue stamps of Malaysia =

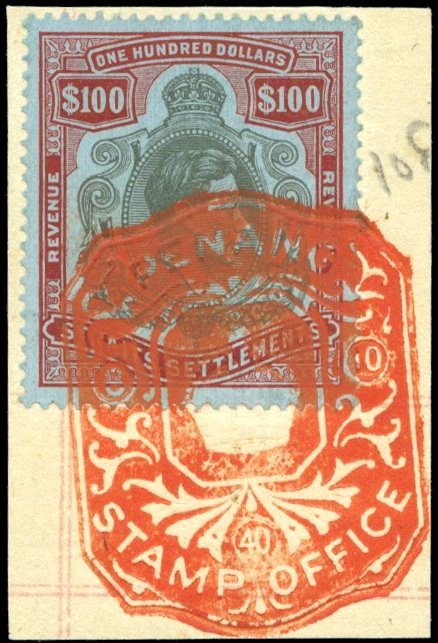
Straits Settlements $100 revenue stamp used in Penang in 1940.

Malaysia first issued revenue stamps as the Straits Settlements in 1863, and continues to do so to this day. Over the years, a number of entities in modern Malaysia have issued revenue stamps.

== Straits Settlements ==
=== Receipt ===
The first revenue stamp issued in the Straits Settlements was an East India postage stamp overprinted S.S. in a diamond. Only about 20 copies are known to exist of this stamp, making it very rare. On 1 April 1867, the Settlements became a British Crown Colony and so Indian revenues were issued overprinted with a crown and a new value in cents. In 1874 a new issue portraying Queen Victoria, and this remained in use until the 1880s with minor changes in the perforation.

=== Marine Policies ===
Marine Policies stamps were issued in order to pay the tax on cargo insurances. A set of forty values ranging from 8c to $12 was issued, and the set included many 'obscure' values such as 37½c or $2.28 due to complicated rates resulting from conversion from pounds sterling. Most of these are very rare as they were withdrawn soon after they were issued.

=== Foreign Bill ===
In 1869, a set of Foreign Bill stamps was issued in a long vertical format, portraying Queen Victoria. Eighteen values are known, and all of these are rare. Very few were used, and only a single copy of the $12 value is known in this condition.

=== Judicial ===
The first Judicial stamps were issued in 1868. A set of twenty values ranging from 10c to $25 was issued in a similar design to the Foreign Bill issues. In 1870 a new set was issued with different colours and values up to $100, and the watermark was changed in 1874. Later revenue issues were overprinted JUDICIAL in bold letters reading up, and these were followed by a number of provisional surcharges in the 1880s. In 1890 a new set with new colours was issued, and finally a postage stamp was overprinted J and surcharged for judicial use. Judicial stamps were withdrawn in 1903.

=== Revenue ===
The first general duty revenue stamps were issued in 1874 in a design similar to Foreign Bill and Judicial stamps. Various values exist from 3c to $50. In 1882 a new design was issued in a smaller format, still portraying Queen Victoria. This design was reissued in new colours between 1888 and 1893. From the 1900s to the 1920s no revenues were issued as dual purpose postage & revenue stamps were issued. However some of the high values were intended solely for fiscal use, such as the $500 values of King Edward VII and King George V. In 1936 a stamp specifically for revenue use was issued, and in 1938 a set of three values of $25, $100 and $500 was issued portraying the new monarch King George VI. Most of these high values are very rare.

=== Entertainments Duty ===
The Straits Settlements issued three small numeral stamps inscribed Entertainments Duty Paid in the 1930s.

== Federated Malay States ==
The Federated Malay States were created in 1895 and they first issued revenues around 1900. Previously the following states had their own separate issues:

- Negri Sembilan (1890-1900)
- Pahang (1890-1903)
- Perak (1880-1900)
- Selangor (1880-1902)
- Sungei Ujong (1880-1893)

Apart from these, the unfederated states of Johore, Kedah and Kelantan also had their own revenue issues.

=== Judicial ===
From 1900 to 1903, a number of provisional overprints were made. Postage stamps of various designs were overprinted J, Judicial or JUDICIAL or additionally surcharged. Most of these are scarce or rare, although there are common issues as well. These were replaced in 1903 with a new design showing a leaping tiger. Initially thirteen values from 3c to $50 were issued, and the high values are quite scarce. Some of these were again reissued with new watermarks in 1908 and 1925.

=== Revenue ===
Initially there were no general duty revenue issues in the Federated Malay States since dual purpose postage & revenue stamps were used for fiscal purposes. However, some of the high values denominated $25 were only intended for revenue rather than postal use. In 1910, the first stamps specifically inscribed for fiscal purposes only were issued. Two values of $100 and £250 were issued in the "elephants" keytype that was already in use on postage stamps. These were later reissued with a new watermark in 1926. In the 1930s, entertainments duty stamps were issued overprinted REVENUE as well.

In the 1910s, impressed duty stamps were prepared for use in the Federated Malay States. Although photographic essays and proofs exist for twelve denominations ranging from 3c to $250, no issued examples have been recorded and it is possible that these were not adopted.

=== Entertainments Duty ===
In the 1920s or early 1930s, the Federated Malay States issued five small numeral entertainments tax stamps in a design similar to those issued by the Straits Settlements.

By 1936, the Federated Malay States had stopped issuing regular revenues, and Negri Sembilan, Pahang, Perak and Selangor issued their own stamps once again.

== Japanese occupation ==
Malaya was occupied by Japan following a two-month campaign in 1941-1942. During the occupation, general revenue stamps issued for use throughout Malaya, but there were also issues for individual states. The vast majority of revenue stamps issued during the occupation were overprints on pre-war revenue or postage stamps.

Between 1942 and 1944, postage stamps of the Straits Settlements and various states were issued with Japanese overprints. Most of these stamps were valid for both postal and fiscal use, but some were not issued for postage and they were only used as revenues. Pictorial postage stamps issued for Japanese Malaya in 1943, as well as unoverprinted postage stamps of Japan issued in 1942–43 are known also used as revenues in Malaya.

The states of Johore, Kedah, Kelantan, Pahang, Penang, Perak, Selangor and Trengganu also issued revenue stamps (or dual-purpose postage-and-revenue stamps which were used fiscally) between 1942 and 1945.

== Thai occupation ==
In 1943, the Japanese transferred control of Kedah, Perlis, Kelantan, and Trengganu to Thailand, which administered them as Si Rat Malai. Dual-purpose postage-and-revenue stamps were issued for use throughout these four states in 1944, and some of these have been recorded with fiscal cancels.

In addition, the states of Kedah (renamed as Syburi), Kelantan and Trengganu individually issued revenue stamps under Thai occupation between 1944 and 1945.

== British Military Administration ==
After Malaya was liberated, the area was administered under British Military Administration. In 1945, King George VI revenues of the Straits Settlements were therefore overprinted BMA MALAYA.

== Federation of Malaya ==
Initially, there were no revenue issues for the Federation of Malaya as postage stamps were used for fiscal purposes. Between 1949 and 1952, high values that were needed for fiscal purposes were issued by each of the following individual states:

- Johore
- Kedah
- Kelantan
- Malacca
- Negri Sembilan
- Pahang
- Penang
- Perak
- Perlis
- Selangor
- Trengganu

General issues were introduced around 1957 inscribed Persekutuan Tanah Melayu Hasil (Federation of Malaya Revenue). Initially three values were issued: $25, $100 and $250. These were reissued several times over the years on different paper and with slightly redrawn designs. These remained in use for years after the federation ceased to exist, as Malaysia only began to issue revenues in 1975.

== Malaysia ==
=== Social Security ===
Various stamps were issued to pay for social security between 1971 and 1973. All of them show the same design, an umbrella sheltering a worker. These were printed by various printers, so there are various changes in the watermark and paper used for the stamps. Ignoring these minor technical differences, there are twenty two different stamps with values from 10c to $10.10.

=== Revenue ===
Malaysia issued its first general duty revenue stamps in 1975, inscribed Hasil Malaysia (Revenue Malaysia) and depicting the country's coat of arms. Three values of $25, $100 and $250 were issued. In 1982, the coat of arms was changed slightly so the set was reissued with the new version. This time $500 and $1000 values were added. Further stamps were issued between 1985 and 2009, and all of them bear the country's coat of arms although they have a wide variety of designs and formats.

Currently revenues are sold at the Inland Revenue department and from all post offices in Malaysia. In recent years the Inland Revenue Board of Malaysia has launched a new e-stamping service to speed up processes and eliminate forgeries, however adhesive revenue stamps continue to be used.

=== Excise ===
The Royal Malaysian Customs also issues taxpaid labels to pay the tax on cigarettes.

== See also ==
- Revenue stamps of the Malay States
- Revenue stamps of Sarawak
- Revenue stamps of Singapore
- Postage stamps and postal history of North Borneo
- Postage stamps and postal history of the Straits Settlements
- Postage stamps and postal history of Malaysia
