= Postage stamps and postal history of the Straits Settlements =

The Straits Settlements of the Malayan Peninsula have a postal history distinct from the other Malayan areas.

== Early postal arrangements ==
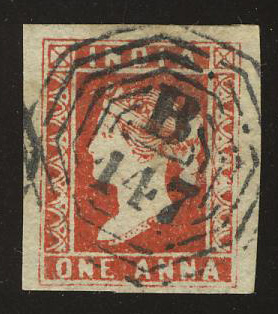
1 anna British India stamp, cancelled at Penang

Mail was originally handled privately by passing ships; the earliest known postal markings date from around 1806, used by a post office on Prince of Wales Island (now Penang).

== Stamps of British India and Burma ==
Service was regularised by the Indian Post Office Act of 1837, by which the East India Company was granted a monopoly of the mail services. All private vessels were required to carry letters at prescribed rates for postage. Handstamps were applied to preadhesive ship letters. Postage stamps of India were used from 1854, the Settlements being considered part of the "Bengal circle", then from 1861 they became part of the "Burma circle". The cancellations used were B/109 at Malacca, B/147 at Penang, and B/172 at Singapore.

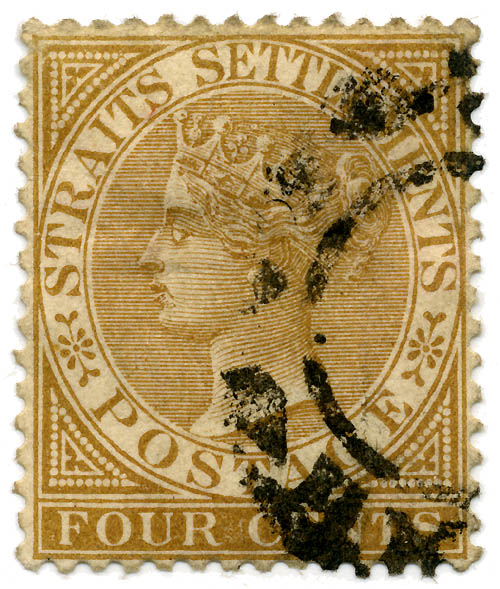
1883 Straits Settlements 4c stamp

== First stamps ==
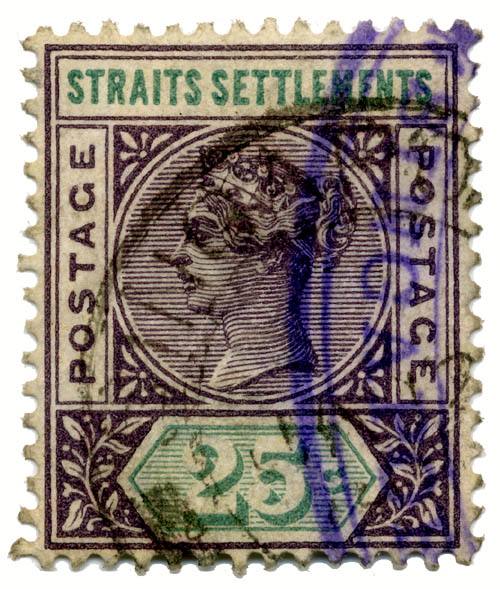
1892 "key plate" stamp of Straits Settlements

When the Settlements became a crown colony in 1867, they began issuing their own stamps, not least because they adopted a currency based on 96 cents to a silver dollar. Beginning on 1 September 1867, nine types in the existing stocks of Indian stamps were overprinted with a crown and a new value in cents. Then, stamps printed by De La Rue for the Settlements started arriving in December; they are notable for a prominent white frame around the profile of Victoria, inscribed "STRAITS SETTLEMENTS POSTAGE". The set of nine values, 2c to 96c, appeared gradually, with the 30c value not being issued until 1872.

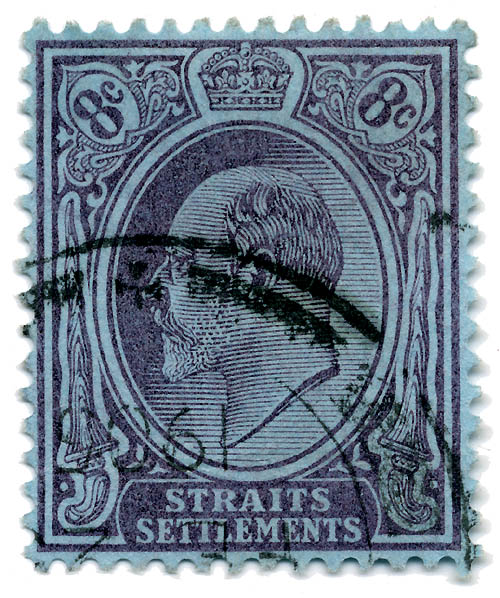
1904 King Edward VII issue

Shortages from 1879 through 1882 necessitated the production of various surcharges, until new 5c and 10c stamps arrived in January 1882. Additional surcharges appeared regularly until the end of the century.

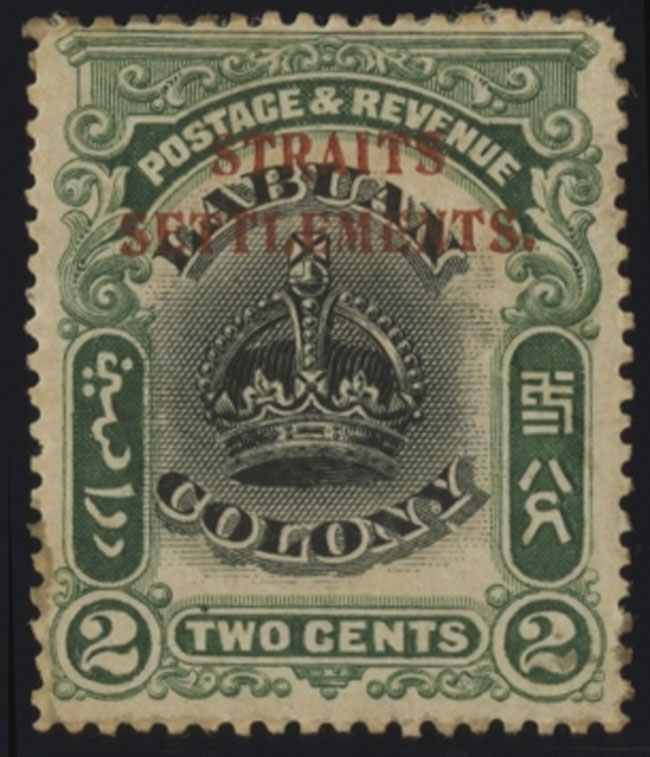
Overprinted stamp of Labuan Colony

== Key plates ==
In 1892, key plate stamps went on sale, a number of them printed in two colours. A notable feature of this issue is the $5 stamp issued in 1898. The accession of King Edward VII necessitated new stamps in 1902, still in a key plate design, supplemented in 1903 with a design using oval vignette.

== Twentieth century ==
The island of Labuan was incorporated into the colony in 1907, the remainder of Labuan Colony's stamps were overprinted "STRAITS SETTLEMENTS.", some with new denominations. In 1910 new stamps appeared with values of $25 and $500 (although available for postage, their more usual use was fiscal). George V replaced Edward VII on stamps beginning in 1912, reusing the frames and replacing only the vignettes. These stamps were overprinted in 1922 to mark the Malaya-Borneo Exhibition. The Straits Settlements also joined in the Silver Jubilee issue for George V in 1935. The last issue of the Straits Settlements was the 1937 George VI series.

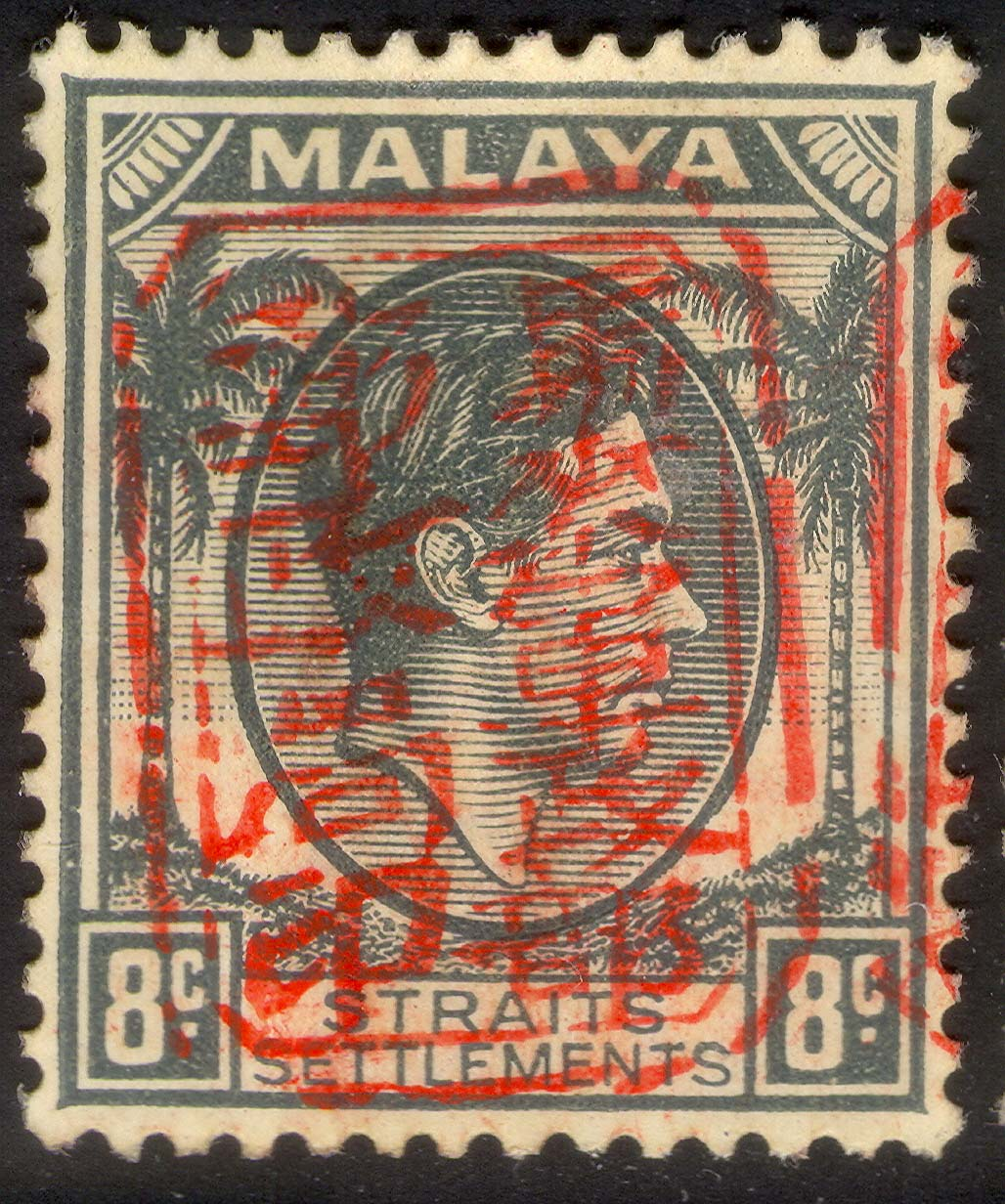
Stamp issued during the Japanese occupation

== World War II ==
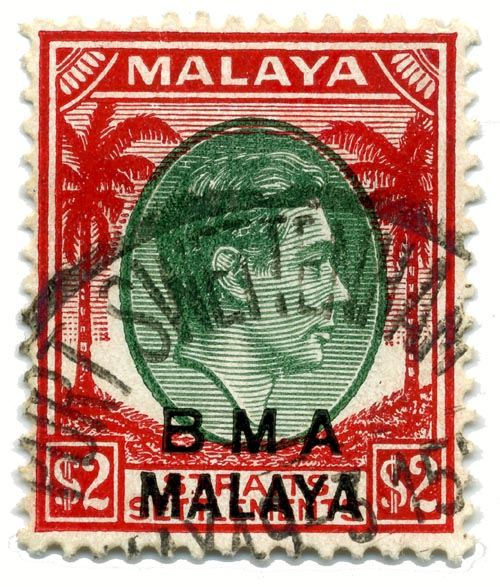
Straits Settlements stamp overprinted "BMA MALAYA"

In March 1942, Japan issued stamps for their occupation, by overprinting existing stamps with Japanese inscriptions. After the Japanese surrendered in 1945, the British military administration issued provisionals by overprinting Straits Settlements stamps with "BMA / MALAYA". These stamps were used until 1948, when stamps were produced for Singapore, Penang and Malacca. The Straits Settlements was dissolved in 1946, with Singapore becoming a separate Crown colony, while Penang and Malacca joined the new Malayan Union.

== See also ==
- Postage stamps and postal history of Malaysia
- Postage stamps and postal history of Singapore

== References and sources ==
Sources

- AskPhil – Glossary of Stamp Collecting Terms
- Encyclopaedia of Postal History
- Lowe, Robson. (1951) The Encyclopedia of British Empire Postage Stamps Volume III. London: Robson Lowe, pp. 296–321.
- Rossiter, Stuart & John Flower. (1986) The Stamp Atlas. London: Macdonald. ISBN 0-356-10862-7
- British Malaya Security Markings: Firm Chops, PERFINS, Forwarding Agents Chops etc.
- Francis E. Wood, "Straits Settlements and native protected states with special reference to stamps of doubtful catalogue status" in The London Philatelist, Feb/Mar 1939.
- Francis E. Wood, Straits Settlements postage stamps. Betws-y-Coed: 1945 or 1948. (Reprinted: Kuala Lumpur, Malaya, Selangor Stamp Club, 1961.)
