= Postage and revenue stamps and postal history of Sarawak =

Sarawak issued stamps that functioned as both postage and revenue purposes from 1869 to 1949 from the period of Raj of Sarawak, Japanese occupation, British Military Administration, to Crown Colony of Sarawak.

== History ==
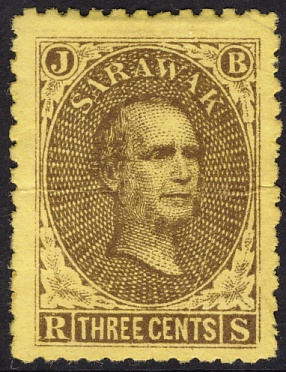
The first stamp in Sarawak was issued in 1869, featuring the portrait of James Brooke with facial value of three cents.

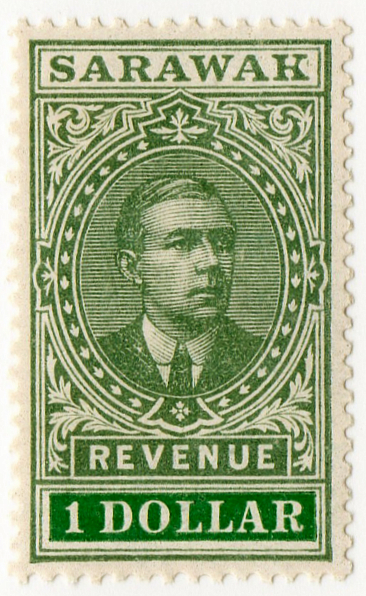
A $1 revenue stamp issued in 1918 featuring the portrait of Charles Vyner Brooke.

The Brooke government first issued postage rules on 1 March 1869, after the death of James Brooke. The rules stated that one stamp should be affixed for all letters below half an ounce in weight, an additional stamp for every additional half-ounce until four ounces, and one stamp should be affixed in all receipts and paid bills, all legal bills of sale, all legal agreements, all bills of lading and Mate's receipts.

The first stamp in Sarawak bears the portrait of James Brooke with a facial value of three cents was issued together with postal rules on 1 March 1869. The stamp was not only for local postage of inland Sarawak but also had franking rights for postage to Singapore, where another stamp from the straits settlement would be added to carry the postage to their destinations. The stamp was also designated for revenue collection. The stamp was manufactured by Mr Charles Whiting based in London through a lithography process. The letters "J" and "B" appear at the upper left and right corners while the letters "R" and "S" appear at the bottom left and right corners respectively, representing "James Brooke, Rajah of Sarawak".

Another stamp was issued in 1875. A 3c black inscribed Sarawak Receipt Stamp portraying Sir Charles Brooke was issued, and ten years later in 1885 this was reprinted in red. The first issue in black is scarcer than the red stamp, but neither of them is particularly rare.

Around 1887, various postage stamps were overprinted with a large R to specify fiscal use only. Some were also additionally overprinted REVENUE ONLY. apart from the initial overprint to confirm this. All overprinted issues were withdrawn on 30 June 1900, the day before a new vertical design was issued, again portraying Sir Charles Brooke. These remained in use until the Rajah's death, and in 1918 this set was reissued with the portrait of the new monarch, his son Sir Charles Vyner Brooke. Some of these were also overprinted with provisional surcharges in 1934. The 1900 and 1918 sets also exist overprinted CUSTOMS diagonally.

Japanese forces overran Sarawak in December 1941. Initially, revenues from the 1918 issues were handstamped in Japanese, but these were quickly replaced with postage stamps overprinted in various Japanese characters. These were used until Sarawak was liberated by Australian forces in 1945. After the war, postage stamps were used for fiscal purposes. Sarawak joined the Federation of Malaya and North Borneo to form Malaysia in 1963. Since then Malaysian revenue stamps have been used in Sarawak.

== See also ==
- Postage stamps and postal history of Malaysia
- Revenue stamps of Malaysia
- Postage stamps and postal history of North Borneo
- Postage stamps and postal history of Brunei
