= Neville Watterson =

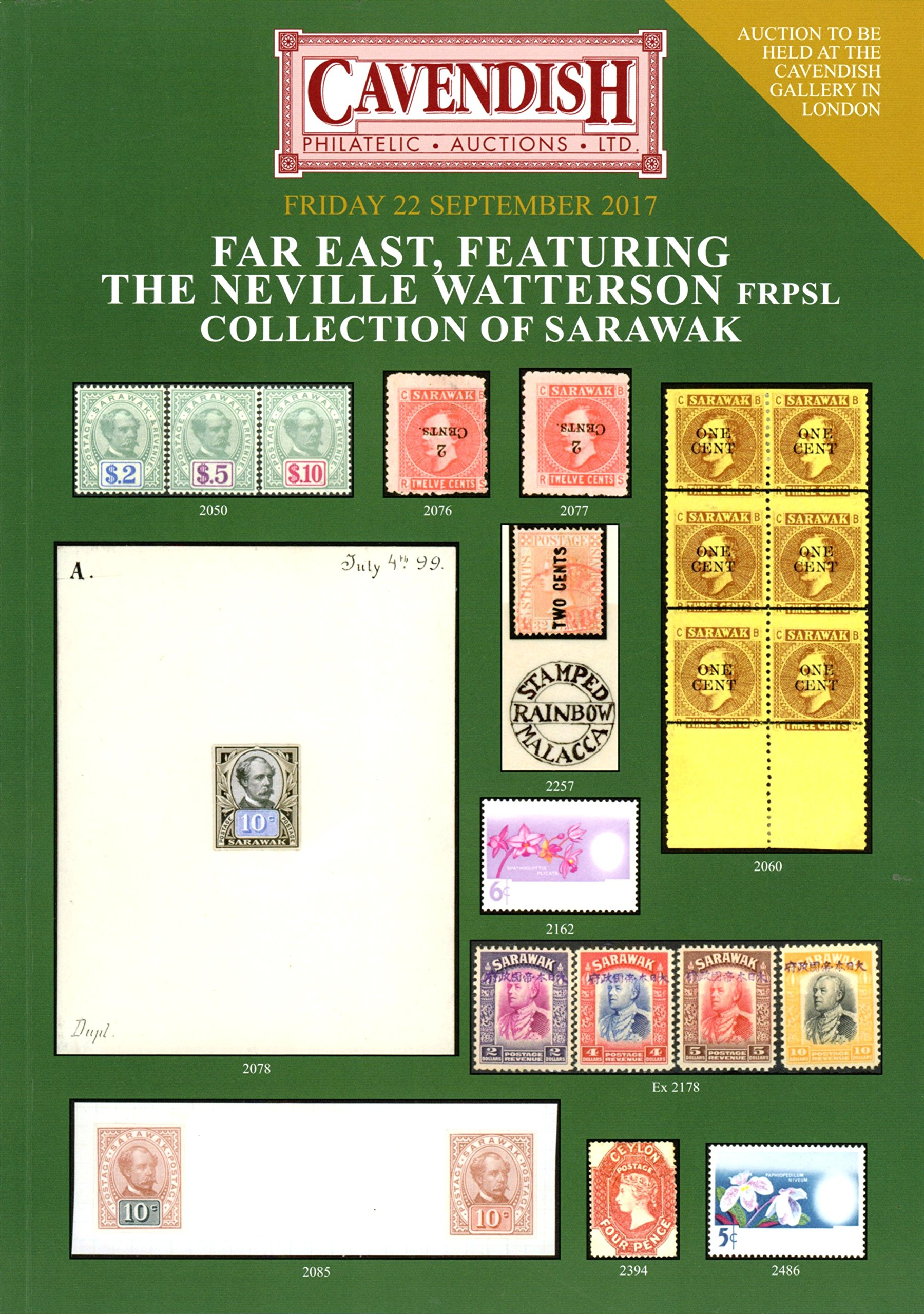
Far East, Featuring The Neville Watterson FRPSL Collection of Sarawak, Cavendish Philatelic Auctions, London, September 2017.

Walter Neville Watterson (1919 - 18 February 2017) was an English civil engineer and philatelist who was a specialist in the stamps and postal history of Sarawak, Borneo, and Brunei. He wrote a two volume history of the mails of the Japanese prisoner of war camps of Borneo during the Second World War.

== Early life and family ==
Walter Watterson was born in Wolverhampton in 1919. He married Betty Taylor in Newmarket, Cambridgeshire, in 1949. They had a daughter Claire.

== Career ==
Watterson worked as a civil engineer in Sarawak in the 1950s, kindling a lifelong interest in the country that was expressed through his philatelic collection.

== Philately ==
Watterson wrote a two volume history of the mails of the Japanese prisoner of war camps of Borneo during the Second World War, the first volume published in 1989 generating such a response from philatelists and former POWs that a second volume was produced in 1994. His collection of Sarawak was sold by Cavendish Philatelic Auctions in London in September 2017.

He was a stalwart of the Northamptonshire Philatelic Society, the East Midlands Federation of Stamp Clubs, the Sarawak Specialists' Society and the Postal History Society. He and Betty were both fellows of the Royal Philatelic Society London.

== Death ==
Watterson died in Northampton General Hospital on 18 February 2017. He was pre-deceased by Betty.

== Selected publications ==
- Sarawak: The issues of 1871 and 1875: Plating studies and postal history. 1989.
- Borneo: The Japanese P.O.W. Camps - Mail of the Forces, P.O.W. and Internees. 1989. ISBN 978-0951495100
- Borneo: Pt. 2: Japanese P.O.W. Camps - Mail of the Forces, P.O.W. and Internees. 1994. ISBN 978-0951495131
- Sarawak Officials: A Survey. 1996. ISBN 978-0951495148
- Sarawak: The De La Rue Story. Brock Publications, 2000. ISBN 978-0951495155
- Sarawak & Brunei: The De La Rue ink colours. 2004.
- Labuan: The beginnings, & 'the Crowns'. Brock Publications, 2008. (With Betty Watterson & Leslie Brueckheimer)

== See also ==
- Postage stamps and postal history of Malaysia
