= V. T. Nathan =

Malaysian lawyer and philatelist

V. T. Nathan

V. T. Nathan (3 November 1937 - 4 February 2017) JMN, KMN, FRSPL, was a Malaysian lawyer and philatelist.

== Early life ==
V. T. Nathan was born in Seremban on 3 November 1937 in Negeri Sembilan.

== Career ==
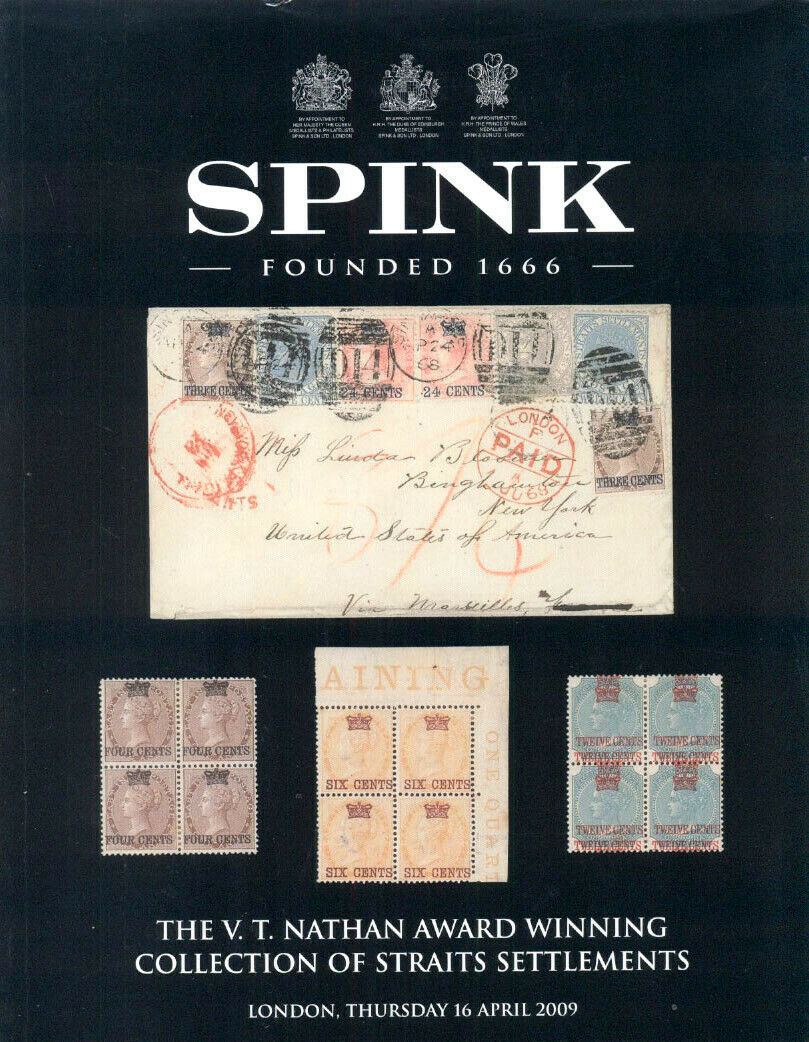
The V. T. Nathan Award Winning Collection of Straits Settlements, Spink, 2009.

Nathan practised as a lawyer.

== Philately ==
Nathan was a specialist in the stamps and postal history of the Straits Settlements. In 1995 his collection won a gold medal at the stamp exhibition in Singapore and at the FIAP International Malpex exhibition in 1997 he won a large gold medal and a National Grand Prix award. In 2000 he won a large gold medal at Indepex and the Grand Prix International.

He was the president of the Philatelic Society of Malaysia.

== Death ==
Nathan died on 4 February 2017.
