= F. E. Wood =

Dr. Francis Ernest Wood (23 September 1876 – 1964) was a medical practitioner and philatelist who was a specialist in the stamps of the Malay States. In 1949 he was awarded the Crawford Medal by the Royal Philatelic Society London for his work Straits Settlements postage stamps.

Wood was a Senior Medical Officer in Perak.

== Selected publications ==
- "Straits Settlements and native protected states with special reference to stamps of doubtful catalogue status" in The London Philatelist, Feb/Mar 1939.
- Straits Settlements postage stamps. Betws-y-Coed: F.E. Wood, 1945 or 1948. (Reprinted: Kuala Lumpur, Malaya, Selangor Stamp Club, 1961.)
