= Postage stamps and postal history of North Borneo =

North Borneo, located in the northern part of the island of Borneo, was a British protectorate from 1888 and a British Crown colony after 1946.

== First stamps ==
Initially, mail from the British protectorate of North Borneo was sent via Labuan or Singapore, using postage stamps of the Straits Settlements. After the North Borneo Chartered Company was founded to administer the territory, it issued its own stamps in 1883. These used a design incorporating the coat of arms (a dhow and a lion), inscribed "NORTH BORNEO", and with the value written in English, Jawi, and Chinese. Initial values included 2c, 4c, and 8c, followed by large 50c and $1 stamps of a more elaborate design with the arms flanked by two natives.

== Later issues ==
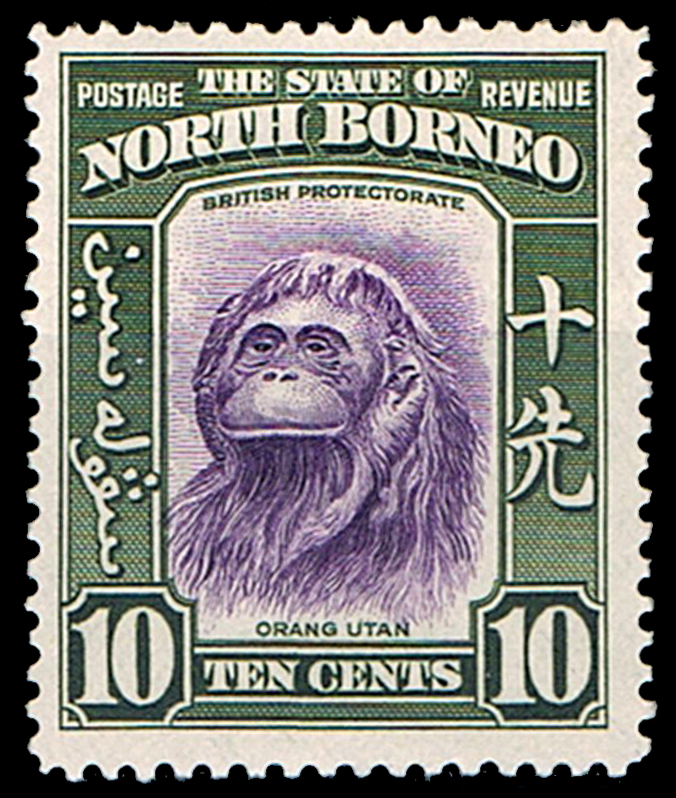
The 1939 definitive series

In 1886 ½c, 1c, and 10c values were added, and there was a demand for 3c and 5c stamps, resolved by overprinting existing types. At the same time, the printers (Blades, East, and Blades of London) produced a new design, largely the same but inscribed "BRITISH NORTH BORNEO", and joined by 25c and $2 values, also with elaborate frames. The stamps were redesigned again in 1888, to say "POSTAGE & REVENUE" instead of just "POSTAGE", at which time the 25c to $2 values also received minor changes. These were followed up in 1889 by even larger and more elaborate $5 and $10 stamps. Between 1883 and 1890, postage stamps of North Borneo were valid to nearby countries only if sent by direct steamer at 8¢ rate, otherwise additional adhesives of either Hong Kong, Labuan or Strait Settlements had to be affixed.

Shortages in 1890, 1891, and 1892 necessitated more surcharges. In 1894, the protectorate issued a new definitive series engraved by Waterlow and Sons, comprising nine pictorials featuring natives plants, animals, and scenes, and inscribed "STATE OF NORTH BORNEO".

North Borneo was made a British protectorate on 12 May 1888. In 1901, stamps were overprinted "British Protectorate.".

== World War II ==
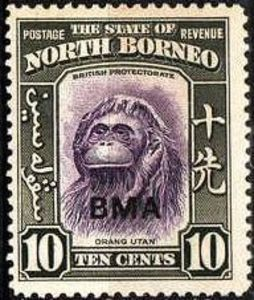
North Borneo stamp overprinted "BMA" in 1945

North Borneo was occupied by Japanese forces in 1942. During the occupation, overprinted stamps of North Borneo and Japan were used. In 1943, two stamps of Japanese design were issued for North Borneo. Following liberation, stamps of North Borneo were overprinted "BMA" by the British Military Administration.

== Post-war ==
The Crown Colony of North Borneo was established in 1946 after the North Borneo Chartered Company ceded the territory to the British Government. The Colony issued stamps until 1963 when North Borneo (as Sabah) joined Malaya, Sarawak and Singapore to form the Federation of Malaysia.

== See also ==
- Postage stamps and postal history of Malaysia
