= Malaya–Borneo Exhibition =

Exhibition in British Malaya and British Borneo

The Malaya–Borneo Exhibition was an exhibition of the trade and economic possibilities of British Malaya and British Borneo which was arranged to synchronise with the Prince of Wales's (later Edward VIII) visit to Singapore in March 1922. Laurence Guillemard, Governor of the Straits Settlements, conceived the idea of bringing people together from Malaya and Borneo for the purpose of enhancing trade and other mutual benefits.

"It was also felt that the opportunity was a fitting one for the exhibition, by the commercial and foreign communities, of imported goods in illustration of the varied trade activities of this country in general, and of the great exchange port of Singapore in particular."

== Overview ==
The Straits Budget described the details of the Planning and Layout of the site situated on reclaimed land adjacent to the Telok Ayer Basin in Singapore. "The large scale on which the Malaya-Borneo Exhibition, which is to be held in April has been arranged, as regards the variety of the exhibits, and the collecting together of arts and crafts, industries with trades of all nationalities, is of necessity occasioning a great deal of work on the part of those engaged in the planning and lay-out of the site in Robinson Road.

The area of the site is 65 acres. It extends from Telok Ayer Market to Mount Palmer, a distance of 900 yards. The width, to be covered by the exhibition between Anson Road and the sea is 530 yards and between the main entrance opposite McCallum Street and the sea is 270 yards. These dimensions are on an equality with the dimensions of international exhibitions. Although much of the Ground appeared open and easy for free planning, in actuality there were many deciding and limiting factors. For example, the massive concrete flooring which had been used for the Goliath cranes and the making of caissons for the reclamation work, is an immovable fixture, altogether 900 feet in length and 65 feet in width. This has been utilised for large exhibition plots, the buildings on which will form one side of the main avenue. Then again, a groan of concrete cylinders have been turned to advantage for they have been surrounded with granite stones and filled up with earth and are now in process of being converted into a picturesque rock garden.

== The Stadium ==
The many details of the planning might lend one at first to imagine that it is a garden city that is in course of construction rather than a trade exhibition, for numerous picturesque features are being arranged. A number of pleasant trees not far from Telok Ayer have been “planted” so as to form an attractive oval filled with foliage, and in the centre of which will he erected a grandstand. This is in the centre of the Borneo and Dayak groups. It was essential also to have a large padang or stadium and the choice of site was limited to some area in the centre of the exhibition, to be non-interfering with the general flow of traffic to be drainable and fairly level, and also, so placed as to be a striking feature of the general plan. The stadium as planned, and now in course of preparation, will he a grass ellipse in width, surrounded by a 60 feet circular road. There will thus be provision for a full-sized football ground on which football matches will be played. On one side will be erected a grandstand, about 140 feet long, facing east towards the main entrance so as to avoid spectators being troubled by the afternoon sun; while on the opposite side of the stadium will be an enclosure for the band. A movable platform is being provided for the centre of the stadium, so that, without discomfort, some five thousand will be able to witness the Dayak and other native dances which will be given there. The tea gardens are to be an attractive feature of this part of the exhibition.

With regard to the trade exhibition itself, every endeavour is being made to allocate to each nationality and group of exhibitors equally effective sites. What might he called the national group, each having its own focussed grouping of buildings are as follows Malay, Chinese, Arabian, Indian, Japanese, European shops, Dayaks, Bornean shops.

== General Effect ==
The main entrance will be in Robinson Road, the approach place from the road being over 100 yards wide. On entering the Exhibition one will look down a long avenue terminating in a triumphal arch through which the distant sea will be visible. To the left the main avenue bordered by exhibits will lead to the Telok Ayer market and on the right to the stadium, teagardens, Chinese and Arabian sections and the wayang and theatre grouped around Mount Palmer. Here there will be numerous native sideshows, a circus and merry-go-rounds, so that part of the Exhibition will no doubt be a very lively one. The other attractions will include two cinemas, the one to be devoted to comedy productions, and the other to official pictures.

Road making has been a great problem but rickshaws will be able to traverse the two miles of roads which will have been constructed. The Exhibition will be brilliantly illuminated and lit electrically from the Harbour Board's power station, and on the highest point an illuminated fountain will play every evening. There will also be firework displays every evening in the stadium. The ground is being supplied with hydrants for use in the case of fire, and there will be stationed in the Exhibition a Fire Brigade and Ambulance and Police Stations.

Special arrangements are being for the sea sports to be held along the South Pier and Quay. A special pagoda or stand will be provided there for accommodation of His Royal Highness. The land sports in addition to the usual flat races will include fencing, wrestling and boxing."

After the Exhibition one feature was retained. The Stadium was re-aligned, rebuilt and enclosed with a twelve foot high bank. It became the venue for significant league and cup football matches.
