= Postage stamps and postal history of Malaysia =

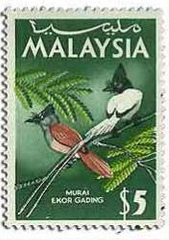
1965 stamps illustrating birds of Malaysia

The history of postage stamps and postal history of Malaysia, a state in Southeast Asia that occupies the south of the Malay Peninsula and Sarawak and Sabah in the north Borneo, includes the development of postal services in these periods:

- the sultanates as British protectorates (1874–1941, 1948–1957);
- Japanese occupation during the Second World War (1941–1945);
- British military administration (1945–1948); and
- independence of the state (since 1957).

Malaysia has been issuing stamps after independence from the United Kingdom in 1957, first as the Federation of Malaya, then as Malaysia after 1963. The national postal operator is Pos Malaysia.

== Mail development ==
Postal history in Malaya tracked from the 19th century, initially postal services for the Malay colonies were provided by the post offices of British India. In 1854, stamps of British India were used.

=== The Straits Settlements ===
In 1867, the first stamps of the Straits Settlements colony were issued, which were stamps of British India overprinted with a crown and new values in local currency. In December 1867, the first definitives were issued.

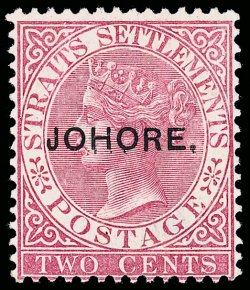
Stamp of Straits Settlements overprinted "Johore" in 1885

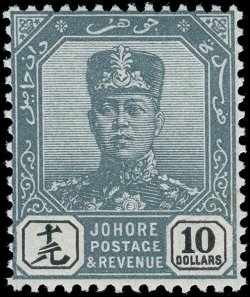
1904 stamp of Johore depicting Sultan Ibrahim

=== State issues ===
Subsequently, the individual Malay states issued stamps, starting with Johor in 1876. Perak and Selangor followed in 1878 and 1881, then Pahang in 1889 and Negri Sembilan in 1891.

Terengganu, Kelantan and Kedah, which were ceded by Thailand in 1909, started issuing stamps from 1910 onwards.

==== Johor ====
The Sultanate of Johor was one of the unfederated Malay states. In 1876, a postal service was set up in the sultanate, and stamps of the Straits Settlements were overprinted with a star and crescent.

From 1884 to 1891, stamps of the Straits Settlements overprinted "Johore" were used. In 1891, definitive stamps were issued. In 1896, stamps were overprinted "KEMAHKOTAAN" to commemorate the coronation of Sultan Ibrahim.

Since 1948, issues have been similar to those of other Malay states.

==== Perak ====
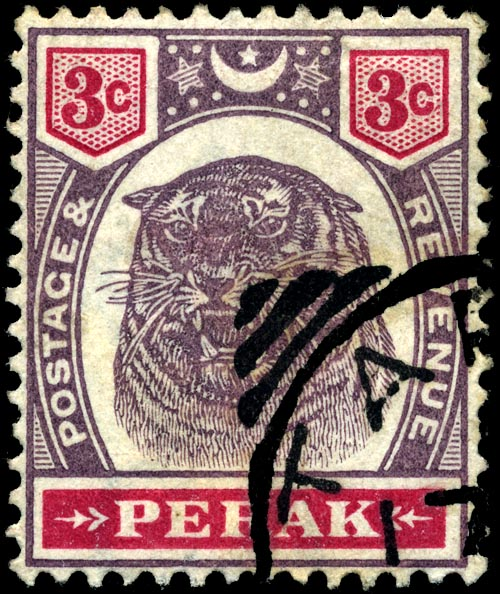
An 1895 stamp of Perak

The Sultanate of Perak become a British protectorate in 1874. In 1874–1878, the stamps of the Straits Settlements were used. In 1878, the first stamp of the Sultanate was issued, overprinting stamps of the Straits Settlementsn with crescent, star and letter "P" in an oval. In 1880–1891, stamps of the Straits Settlements were overprinted "Perak". In 1892, stamps with the image of a jumping tiger were issued, followed by stamps featuring the image of a tiger's head or elephants in 1895–1899.

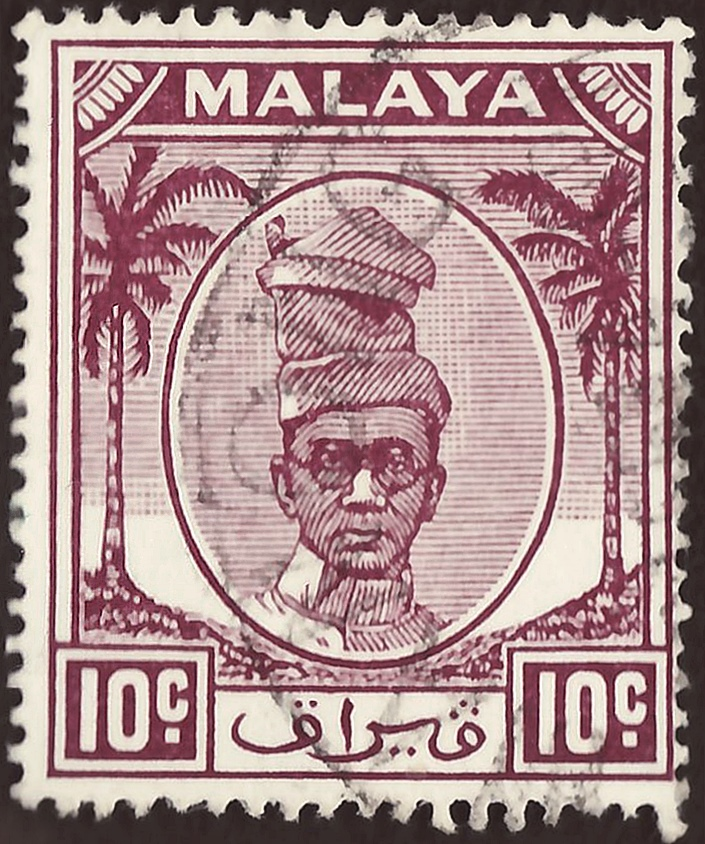
1950 stamp of Perak with a portrait of the Sultan

In 1900–1935, stamps of the Federated Malay States were used. In 1935–1941 two sets of definitive stamps were issued. Since 1948, issues have been similar to those of other Malay states.

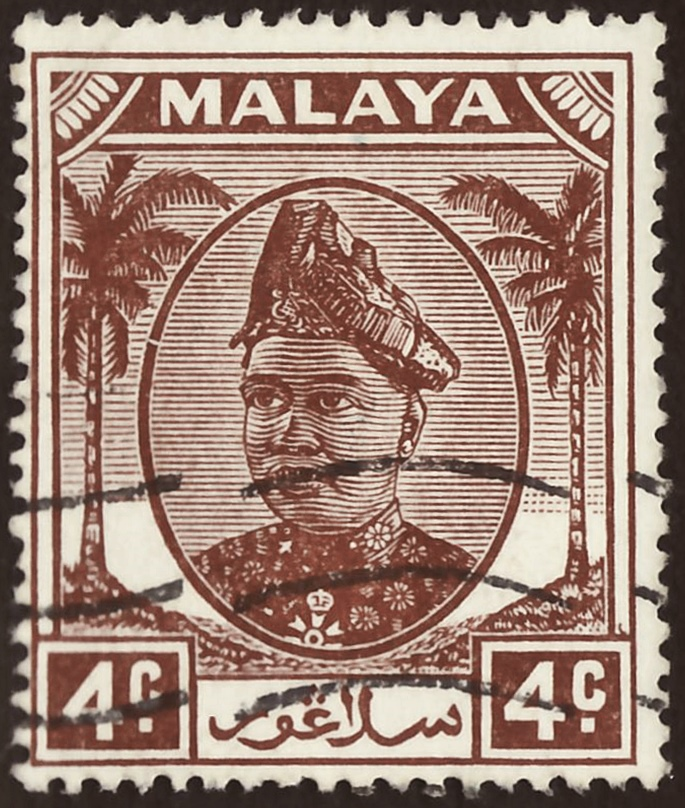
1949 stamp of Selangor with a portrait of the Sultan

==== Selangor ====
Stamps of the Straits Settlements were overprinted for use in the Sultanate of Selangor in 1881. In 1891–1895, stamps depicting a jumping tiger were issued. In 1895–1897, a new series with the image of a tiger's head or elephants was issued.

From 1900 to 1935, stamps of the Federated Malay States were used. The 1935–1941 series depicted a mosque in Klang or a portrait of the Sultan.

Beginning in 1948, issues have been similar to those of other Malay states.

==== Pahang ====
The Pahang Sultanate became a British protectorate in 1888 and was part of the Federated Malay States from 1895.

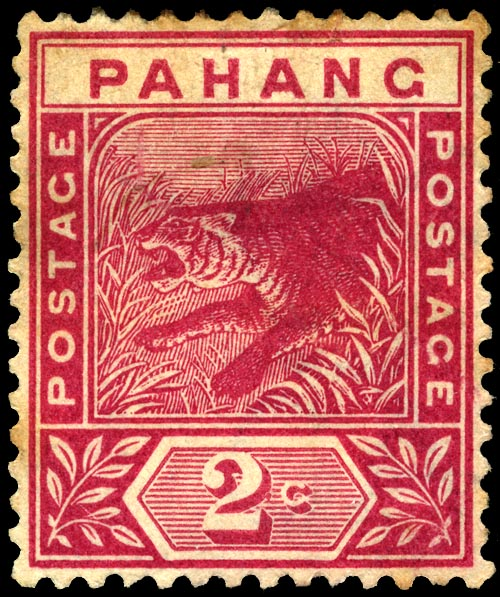
An 1892 2c stamp of Pahang

The first stamps of Pahang appeared in 1889, overprinting on stamps of the Straits Settlements. In 1891, stamps of the Straits Settlements were surcharged with new value for the Sultanate.

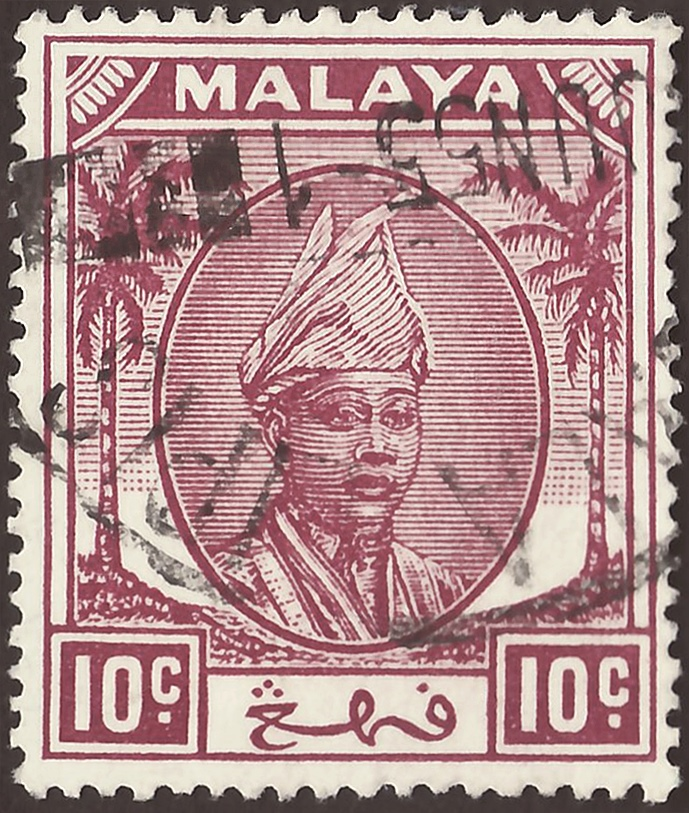
1950 stamp of Pahang with a portrait of the Sultan of Pahang

In 1891–1897, a series of stamps depicted a jumping tiger or a tiger's head similar to those of other Malay states during that period. In 1898, stamps of Perak were overprinted "Pahang".

In 1900–1935, stamps of the Federated Malay States were used. In 1935–1941, these were replaced by the release of the sultanate.

Beginning in 1948, stamps have been similar to those of other Malay states.

==== Negri Sembilan ====
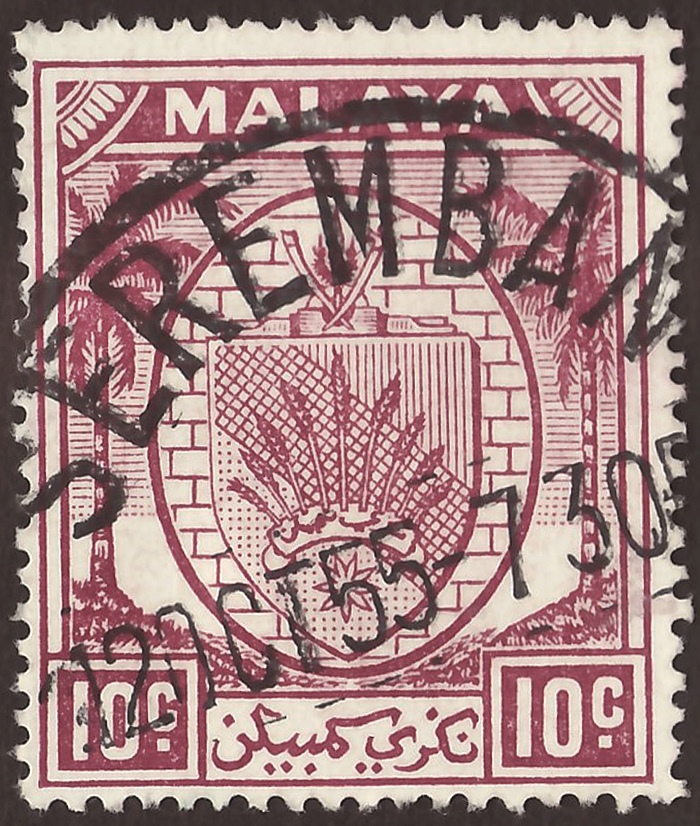
1949 stamp of Negeri Sembilan with the coat of arms of Negeri Sembilan

Negri Sembilan was placed under the control of a British Resident in 1887. The first stamp was issued in August 1891, overprinting "Negri Sembilan" on stamps of the Strait Settlements, and then came a stamp with the drawing of a jumping tiger. In 1896, a series of stamps with the image of a tiger's head was issued.

From 1900 to 1935, stamps of the Federated Malay States were used. Since 1935, stamps were issued depicting the coat of arms.

- Regional Edition

In 1878, Sungai Ujong (under the control of Great Britain since 1873) issued its own stamps. It was an India ½ anna stamp overprinted with crescent, stars and the abbreviation "SU" in an oval, the issue was informal. In 1880, similar overprint appeared on 2 cent stamps of the Strait Settlements. In 1881, stamps of the Strait Settlements were overprinted "Sungei Ujong". From 1891 to 1895, stamps with similar designs to those of Negri-Sembilan were issued. After Sungai Ujong had incorporated into Negri-Sembilan, stamps of the latter were used since 1895.

==== Terengganu ====
Terengganu was transferred from Siam to Great Britain under the terms of the Anglo-Siamese Treaty of 1909. In 1910, the first stamps were issued. In 1922, stamps were overprinted to commemorate the Malaya-Borneo Exhibition. In 1937, a set of postage due stamps was issued. Since 1948, issues have been similar to those of other Malay states.

==== Kelantan ====
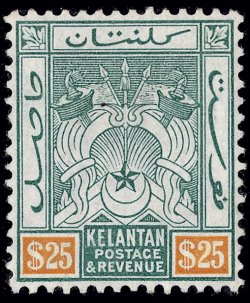
1911 stamp of Kelantan with the coat of arms

Kelantan was part of Siam until coming under British control in 1909. Kelantan was one of the unfederated Malay states. In 1909, stamps of the Federated Malay States were used. In 1911, stamps were first issued for Kelantan featuring the coat of arms of the sultanate. In 1922, stamps were overprinted to commemorate the Malaya-Borneo Exhibition. Since 1948, issues have been similar to those of other Malay states.

==== Kedah ====
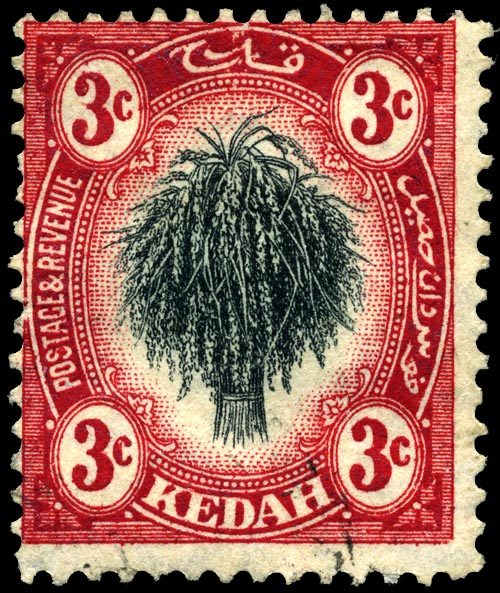
A 1912 stamp of Kedah

After Kedah was transferred from Siamese control in 1909, stamps of the Straits Settlements and the Federated Malay States were used. In 1912, the first set of stamps depicting a rice sheaf, a peasant with a buffalo and a government building, were issued. Stamps overprinted "Malaya Borneo Exhibition" for the Malaya-Borneo Exhibition were issued in 1922. After 1948, Kedah issued stamps with similar designs to those of the other Malay states.

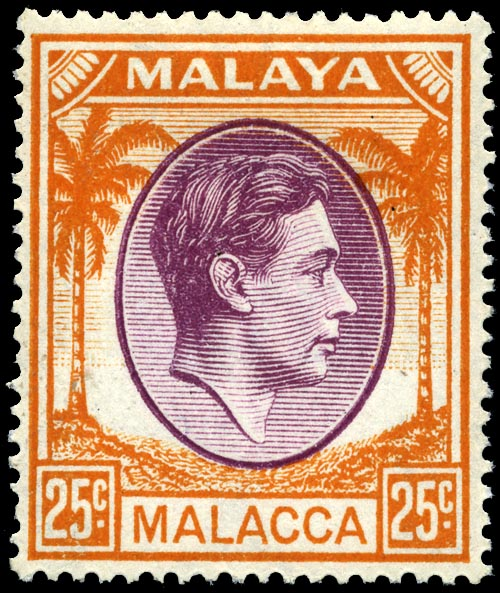
A 1949 stamp of Malacca depicting George VI

==== Malacca ====
The state of Malacca was part of the British colony of Straits Settlements. Malacca began issuing stamps in 1948 featuring the portrait of British monarch. Since 1960, stamps are issued with the coat of arms of Malacca.

==== Penang ====
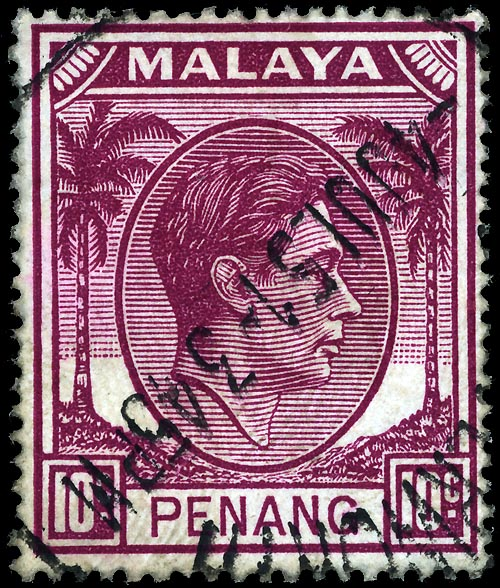
A 1949 stamp for Penang Malaya depicting George VI and cancelled in 1951

Penang was part of the British colony of Straits Settlements. Stamps were first issued when Penang became a state in the Malayan Union in 1948. Since 1960, the emblem of Penang are depicted on its stamps.

==== Perlis ====
The stamps of the Federated Malay States were used in Perlis in 1909–1912. From 1912 to 1942, Perlis was in a postal union with Kedah and used stamps of Kedah. Perlis began issuing its own stamps in 1948.

==== Sabah ====
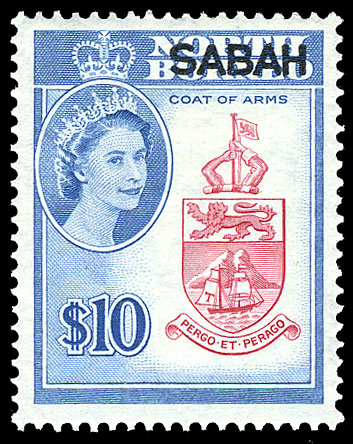
Stamp of North Borneo overprinted "Sabah", 1964

Sabah (as North Borneo) was a British protectorate from 1888 and a British Crown colony after 1946. The Colony issued stamps until 1963 when Sabah joined Malaya, Sarawak and Singapore to form the Federation of Malaysia.

==== Sarawak ====
In Sarawak, stamps of British India were used from 1859. In 1869, the first stamps were issued.

In the period from 1869 to 1941, series of stamps with the image of the Rajahs of the Brooke dynasty were issued. On the 1869 stamps, in the corners are the letters "JBRS" (an abbreviation of "James Brooke, Rajah of Sarawak"). Charles Brooke was depicted on stamps issued from 1871 to 1917. The last Rajah on the issues of 1918–1941 was Charles Vyner Brooke.

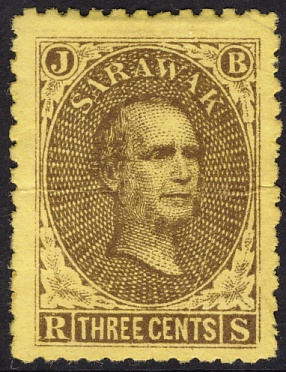
First Sarawak stamp, 1869

Initially, before Sarawak was admitted to the Universal Postal Union in 1897, its stamps were valid only for delivery to Singapore, where additional stamps were affixed for further shipping.

Sarawak was made a British protectorate in 1888. After the Japanese occupation in 1941, stamps were overprinted by the Japanese forces. In 1943, two stamps of Japanese design were issued for use throughout Sarawak and North Borneo. After liberation in 1945, Sarawak came under British military administration, during which stamps were overprinted "BMA" in 1945 and used in the post offices of Brunei, Labuan, North Borneo and Sarawak.

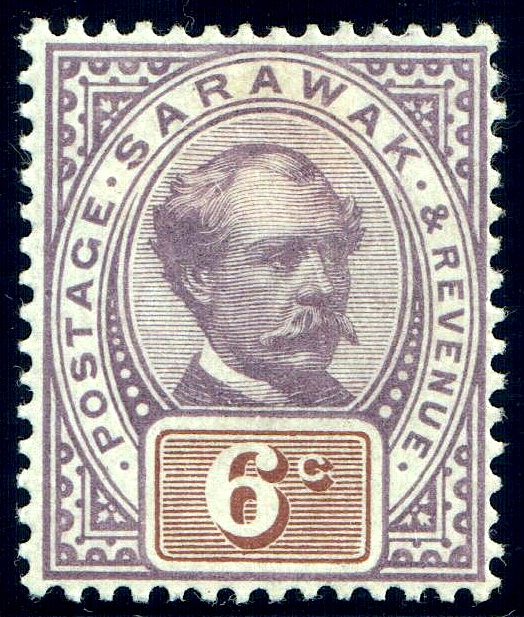
An 1888 stamp of Sarawak

A set of commemorative stamps was issued in 1946 to mark the 100th anniversary of the Brooke dynasty. In the same year, Sarawak was ceded to Britain as a Crown Colony. In 1947, stamps of Sarawak were overprinted with the British royal monogram. In 1950, a series of definitive stamps showing images of butterfly, pangolin, a map of the colony and other local themes were released.

=== Federated Malay States ===
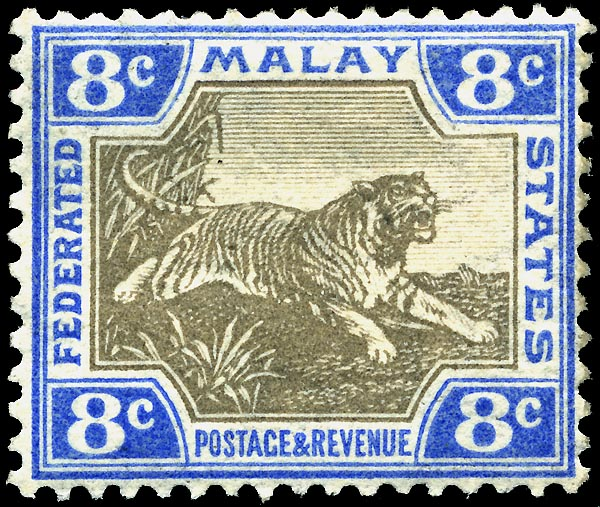
A 1905 stamp of the Federated Malay States

In 1896, the Federated Malay States were formed. The first stamps of the Federated Malay States began in 1900, when the stamps of Negri-Sembilan and Perak were overprinted "Federated Malay States".

In 1901, a series of stamps of 12 denominations was issued, showing a jumping tiger or an elephants. Stamps of the same designs continued were issued until 1934 in a large number of varieties. During July 16, 1900, to January 1, 1902, due to a shortage of stamps, stamps of the Straits Settlements were also used. The stamps of the Federated Malay States ceased in 1935 and were replaced by stamps of the individual states.

=== Malayan Postal Union ===
In 1935, the Malayan Postal Union was created, which included the Straits Settlements and the Federated Malay States. Only postage due stamps were issued with the inscription "Malayan postal union", which were used in the colony and the individual states. Similar postage due stamps were used in Malaysia until 1966 and in Singapore until 1968.

== Japanese occupation ==
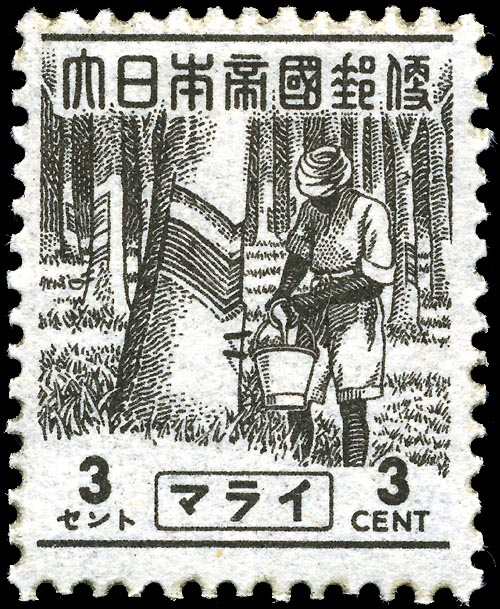
A 1943 stamp for the Japanese occupation of Malaya

After the occupation of Malaya by the Japanese forces, in 1942, stamps of the Straits Settlements were handstamped "Post of the Military in Malaya" in Japanese. Later issues were overprinted "Dai Nippon 2602 Malaya" or "Japanese post" in Japanese inscriptions. The same overprints were also applied to stamps of the individual states.

In 1943, a series of 10 definitive stamps was released. In 1943 and 1944, two sets of commemorative stamps were issued. The texts on these stamps were only in Japanese and were in circulation in Malaya and Singapore.

In October 1943, as compensation for participation in the war on the side of Japan, Kedah, Kelantan, Perlis and Terengganu were transferred by the Japanese to Thailand. In 1943, six stamps were issued in these territories with the inscription "Thailand" in Thai and English and denominated in Malay currency. The image on these stamps are similar to those of the 1943 Thailand issue showing a monument.

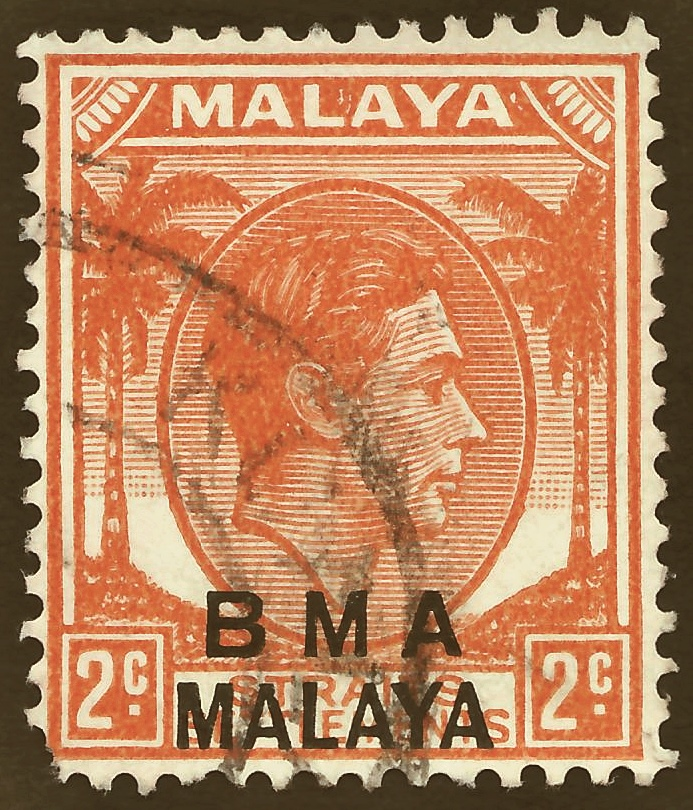
Stamp overprinted by the British Military Administration for Malaya

== British military administration ==
In October 1945, stamps of the Straits Settlements were overprinted B.M.A. MALAYA by the British Military Administration. These were available throughout Malaya, and used till regular postage stamps were produced for each state after the formation of the Malaya Federation in 1948, the last being Kelantan in 1951.

== Independence ==
=== Malaya Federation ===
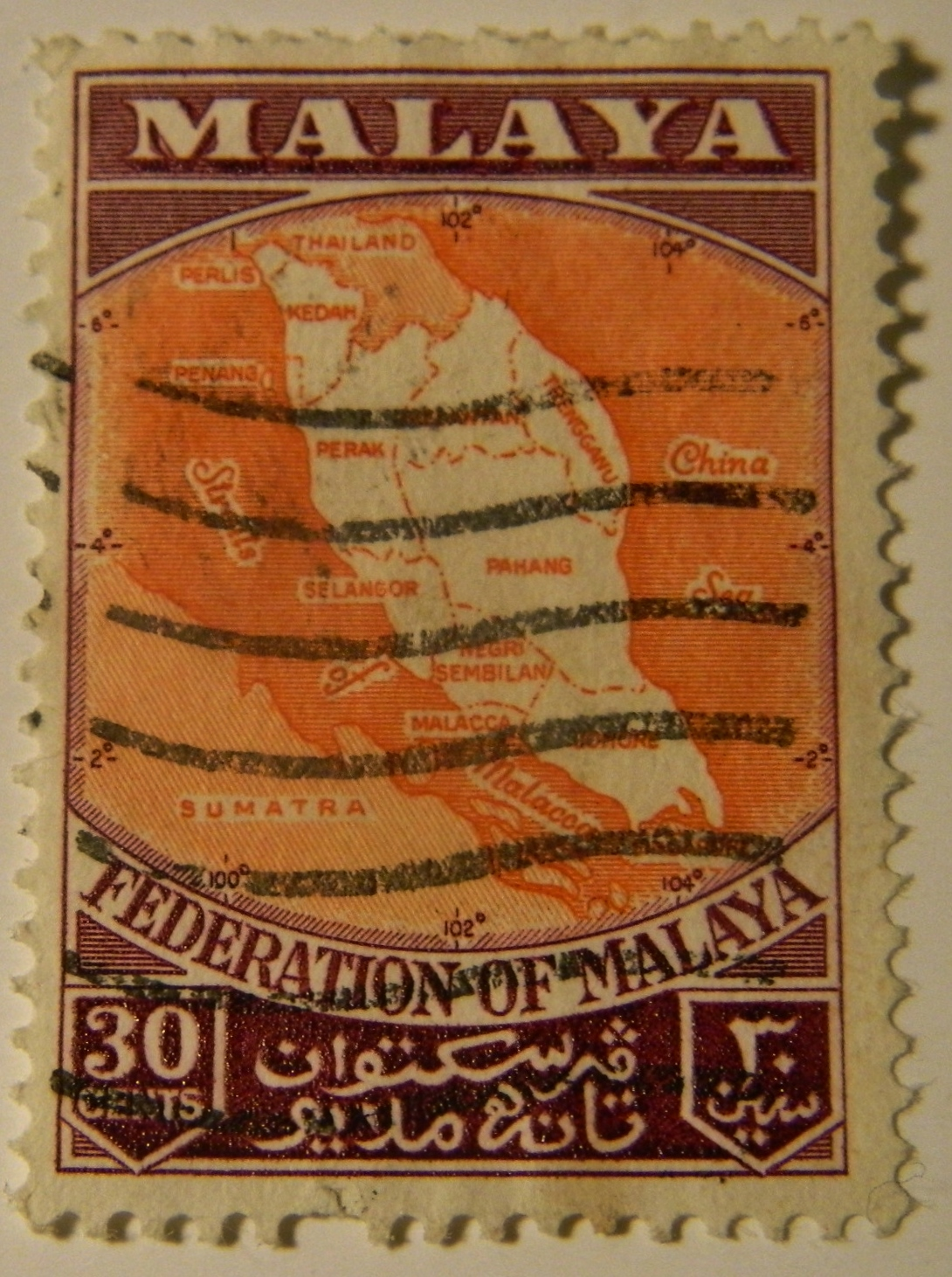
A stamp showing a map of Malaya issued on May 5, 1957

The Malaya Federation began issuing stamps on May 5, 1957, in preparation for independence from Great Britain in the same year. The four stamps of the first series were inscribed "Federation of Malaya" and depicted the coat of arms, and map of the state.

Only commemorative stamps were issued by the Federation. Definitive stamps were issued by the individual states of the Federation.

==== Malayan Federation stamps ====
===== 1957 =====
- Malaya Federation issue
- Independence Day

===== 1958 =====
- U.N. Economic Commission for Asia and Far East Conference, Kuala Lumpur
- 1st Anniversary of Independence
- 10th Anniversary of Declaration of Human Rights

===== 1959 =====
- Inauguration of Parliament

===== 1960 =====
- World Refugee Year
- Natural Rubber Research Conference

===== 1961 =====
- Installation of Yang Di-Pertuan Agong (Tuanku Syed Putra)
- Colombo Plan Conference, Kuala Lumpur

===== 1962 =====
- Malaria Eradication
- National Language Month
- Introduction of Free Primary Education

===== 1963 =====
- Freedom from Hunger
- Cameron Highlands Hydro-Electric Scheme.

=== Malaysia ===
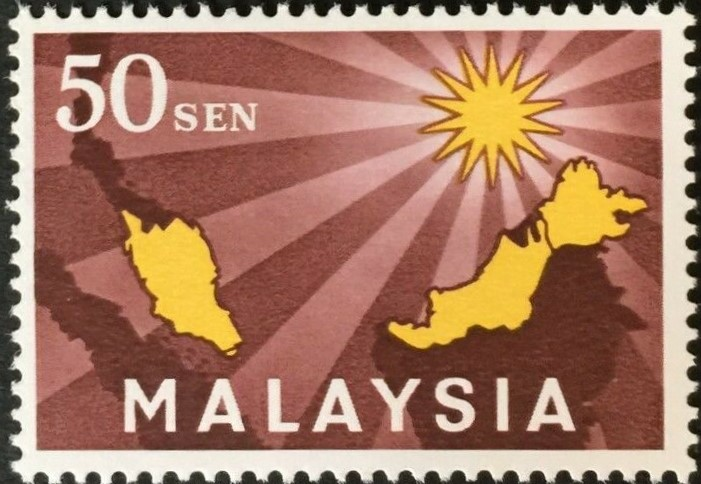
A stamp showing a map of Malaysia issued on September 16, 1963

==== Malaysian definitive stamps ====
Stamps are issued for all states of Malaysia, mainly definitive stamps of the same design, but with their respective state names. Definitive stamps are issued for use in all states only in high denominations (from 25 cents to 10 dollars). As for the low denominations (from 1 to 20 cents), stamps are produced for the individual states.

- Orchid and bird definitives, 1965

During 1965 Malaysia issued its first definitive stamps. The stamps featured orchids for the State low values and birds for the Malaysia high values. Each State had its own set, identical with the exception of the State name and Rulers portrait or State crest as applicable. The eight high values were printed in portrait format, featuring Malaysian birds, and had 'MALAYSIA' printed on them in place of State names.

- State low values, 15 November 1965

The stamps were designed by A. Fraser-Brunner.

The thirteen states issuing stamps were: Johore, Kedah, Kelantan, Malacca, Negri Sembilan, Pahang, Penang, Perak, Perlis, Sabah, Sarawak, Selangor, and Trengganu.

Proofs were also produced for Singapore, but the stamps were never issued as Singapore withdrew from Malaysia, becoming an independent country.

The stamps were printed in landscape format by Harrison & Sons in England in two panes of 100, 10 x 10, with the cylinder numbers appearing on the right of the bottom margins, one for each colour, the left pane being numbered 1A and the right pane numbered 1B. There were two types of gum in use, Gum Arabic and PVA, the differences are clear to see, Gum Arabic being glossy and PVA matt. The colours were not produced by the standard four colour lithography method, cyan, yellow, magenta and black, but had dedicated colours as required by each value printed in photogravure. The left of the bottom margin contained colour check blocks, one for each colour surrounded by a black box, this black being for the State customisation black cylinder. The first issues were on paper watermarked 'Multiple SPM' upright and comb perforated 14 1/2. A few values appeared later on with watermark sideways and then later again without watermark.

The values issued were 1 cent, 2 cents, 5 cents, 6 cents, 10 cents, 15 cents and 20 cents. Various proofs exist showing the individual colours and combined up to full colour proofs. In addition, each value was produced on Harrison proof cards in full colour.

From the outset, there were problems with printing this issue as there are a number of missing colours present, in some cases more than one colour, indicating poor quality control. Some of the missing colours are now very difficult to find as in some cases only few stamps on a sheet were affected, generally 10 or less. Many of these varieties were the result of one of the printing colour supplies being interrupted during the print run and restarting, causing a missing colour on one or more columns.

- Missing colours are known as follows:

Johore: 1 cent grey, 5 cents yellow, 10 cents green, 15 cents green and 20 cents bright purple.

Kedah: 1 cent grey, 2 cents yellow, 2 cents green, 5 cents black (country name & portrait), 5 cents red, 10 cents red, 10 cents green, 20 cents bright purple and 20 cents yellow.

Kelantan: 1 cent magenta, 10 cents red, 20 cents bright purple and 20 cents yellow.

Malacca: 5 cents yellow and 5 cents red.

Negri Sembilan: 5 cents yellow and 5 cents red.

Pahang: 1 cent grey, 5 cents red and 10 cents red.

Penang: 5 cents yellow, 5 cents red, 5 cents blue, 5 cents blue and yellow, 6 cents yellow, 15 cents green, 15 cents black, 20 cents bright purple and 20 cents yellow.

Perak: 2 cents dark green, 5 cents yellow, 10 cents red, 15 cents black, 15 cents magenta and 20 cents bright purple.

Perlis: None.

Sabah: 2 cents dark green.

Sarawak: 1 cent grey, 2 cents black, 2 cents dark green, 2 cents yellow-olive, 6 cents black (country name & shield) and 10 cents red,

Selangor: 1 cent magenta, 2 cents yellow, 5 cents yellow, 5 cents red, 10 cents red, 15 cents green, 20 cents bright purple and 20 cents green.

Trengganu: 15 cents black (country name & portrait) and 20 cents bright purple.

- medium and high values

Eight values were issued for the medium and high values featuring Malaysian birds. The values were 25 cents, 30 cents, 50 cents, 75 cents, $1, $2, $5 and $10 and were intended for use in any Malaysian State. As with the low values, they were printed in two panes of 100, 10 x 10 with cylinder numbers 1A and 1B for the left and right pane, watermarked 'Multiple PTM upright' perforated 14 1/2. Various proofs exist showing the individual colours and combined up to full colour proofs. In addition, each value was produced on Harrison proof cards in full colour. As with the low values, missing colours can be found on a few values and inverted watermarks on the 25 cents, 30 cents, 50 cents, $1, $2 and $5 values.

- Missing colours are known as follows:

30 cents, blue, 30 cents yellow, 50 cents yellow, 50 cents scarlet.

Constant flaws can be found on most values, some of them being catalogued by Stanly Gibbons for the first time in 2013.

- Butterflies definitives

There were seven values for each state and eight high values inscribed 'Malaysia'. The states were: Johore, Kedah, Kelantan, Malacca, Negri Sembilan, Pahang, Penang, Perak, Perlis, Sabah, Sarawak, Selangor, and Trengganu. The original state issues were printed by Bradbury Wilkinson & Sons in the United Kingdom, in sheets of 200 in two panes of 100, 10 x 10, for the values of 1c, 2c, 5c, 6c, 10c, 15c and 20c. The printing process was lithography.

Colour separation proofs for each individual colour were printed for each value, and the colours combined in a process that eventually produced a full colour proof. These proofs were produced, initially, in small units, four or so and later as full sheets. This printing took place to ensure that all colours printed correctly when combined and also registered correctly. The more common sheet proofs can be easily identified from the smaller units as the latter have white borders. The stamps printed as sheets had a design that allowed for 'bleeding' between each stamp, printing over the perforations. Each value had two separate black colours, the first was applied as detail for the butterfly and the stamp value, being common for all States. and the second for the State name, Rulers portrait and/or State coat of arms, this being the 'customising' colour for the base stamps.

In addition to sheet stamps, two values, 10 cents and 15 cents, were produced as coil stamps for use in vending machines in several locations throughout Malaysia. The designs were similar to the state values, but produced with 'Malaysia' in place of a state name as they were for use in any state. These coils were printed by Harrison & Sons in photogravure. From the start, the coil stamp machines proved to be inefficient at dispensing the correct values for the money tendered, possibly due to humidity affecting the stamps. Due to these problems, the machines were dispensed with quite soon after they commenced their duty. As a result, commercially used examples of both values are scarce. During 2006 a variant of the gum was identified. It is brown, with a clear 'ribbing' effect. This may have been a trial to overcome some of the problems with the machines, the ribbing possibly helping to prevent curling of the individual stamps. Harrison Proof Cards exist for both values with an imperforate stamp in full colour on each.

- Harrison & Sons reprints

During 1978, unannounced reprints for some state values were issued printed in photogravure by Harrison & Sons, the same printer that produced the coil stamps earlier. Some of these reprints are quite scarce, particularly the Perlis 10 cents and Sabah 20 cents values, as they were replaced by the new issue of Flowers and Animals the same year, and the new issue had not been announced by the post office. Once again, the stamps were printed in sheets of 200 in two panes of 100, 10 x 10. Unlike the Bradbury Wilkinson printings, these sheets had cylinder numbers in the bottom right margins, one for each colour and numbered 1A for the left pane and 1B for the right. These stamps can easily be separated out from the Bradbury Wilkinson printings, as photogravure produces edges with a 'fuzzy' look, caused by the photographic process when producing the printing cylinders. This can clearly be seen on the edges of the word 'Malaysia'. Bradbury Wilkinson printings have clear, straight edges. There are also differences in shade, but these are unreliable. There were two reprints, not all values being reprinted twice, and new values produced during the second printing. It is this printing that produced the scarce 10 cents value. The only proofs that have appeared to date are single full colour proofs on Harrison & Sons presentation cards, all values existing. It is considered that only two each of these cards would have been produced, one for the printers record and one for the Malaysian Post Office in Malaysia.

- Agricultural and fruits definitives, 1986

During 1986, a new set of definitives featuring agricultural produce and fruit stamps were issued, seven low values for each State and eight medium and high values inscribed 'Malaysia' for use in any State. This issue proved to be the most complex ever produced by Malaysia, lasting for over 14 years, the last printing in the original format taking place during 2000. The issue is notable for the perforation, gum and watermark varieties. The low values were identical for each State, except for the state name, state crest and ruler, or state crest only for those States without a ruler. The stamps were printed in five colour lithography, cyan, yellow, magenta and black with grey for highlighting various areas and a browny-grey shade for the background panel. They were printed on phosphorised 'Multiple SPM' paper with a wavy pattern, in sheets of 100, 10 by 10 and had pink gum and were perforated 12 by 12. The low and medium values were printed by 'Security Printers Malaysia' in Petaling Jaya, near Kuala Lumpur. The four high values were printed by Harrison & Sons in the United Kingdom. The low values had plate numbers, one for each colour used for printing, in the top left, top right, bottom left and bottom right of each sheet, in the format 1A, 1A 1A etc., with colour dabs above or below each series of plate numbers.

- State low values

The seven values issued for each state were 1 cent, 2 cents, 5 cents, 10 cents, 15 cents, 20 cents and 30 cents.

The 1 cent featured Coffee The 2 cents featured Coconuts The 5 cents featured Cocoa The 10 cents featured Black Pepper The 15 cents featured Rubber The 20 cents featured Oil Palm The 30 cents featured Rice

==== Malaysian commemorative stamps ====
The first commemorative stamps of Malaysia were issued on September 16, 1963, to celebrate the creation of the federation, showing a map of the nation.

On 31 August 1982, Malaysia issued its first miniature sheet to commemorate its 25th anniversary as an independent nation. The sheet was much used on first day covers and as a result sold out early. This was rectified by ordering an additional printing from the Austrian printer, Rosenbaum Brothers of Vienna, to satisfy the demand. Many years later, it was noticed that the first printings had a silver frame around the edges of the top left 10 cents stamp, this not being the case with the reprints, which had none. As a result, due to the high usage of the original sheet on first day covers, mint sheets with the silver frame are scarcer than used, and used without the silver frame are scarcer than mint. The silver frame is difficult to see, and is best viewed by holding the sheet at an angle to the light.

== See also ==
- Singapore Philatelic Museum
- List of Malaysian stamps
- Revenue stamps of Malaysia

== Sources ==
- Stanley Gibbons Ltd: various catalogues
- Encyclopaedia of Postal Authorities
- Rossiter, Stuart & John Flower. The Stamp Atlas. London: Macdonald, 1986. ISBN 0-356-10862-7
