= Revenue stamps of the Isle of Man =

The 1966 £5 revenue stamp, used in 1973

Revenue stamps of the Isle of Man refer to the adhesive revenue or fiscal stamps which were issued by the British Crown dependency of the Isle of Man between 1889 and 1976. British key type revenue stamps with an appropriate inscription were issued on the island until 1966, when revenue stamps showing various scenes and symbols of the island began to be issued. The last set of stamps was issued in 1976. From around 1920 to the 1970s, hundreds of contribution stamps were issued for National Insurance and related schemes.

== Revenue ==
=== 1889–1966 ===
Since the Isle of Man was politically separate from the United Kingdom, it had a different fiscal system and did not use British revenues (although it used British postage stamps). Revenues were needed to pay fees connected to transfers of land and property. The first series came out in 1889, and they were British key types portraying Queen Victoria with the inscription ISLE OF MAN in the bottom tablet. From 1894 some stamps were surcharged with the same face value in black in order to make the denomination easier to see. Similar key types were used for many years, with stamps bearing the portraits of the following monarchs:

- Queen Victoria (1889–95)
- King Edward VII (1903–15)
- King George V (1921)
- King George VI (1951)
- Queen Elizabeth II (1960–61)

Most of these stamps are hard to find, and some of them command high prices for collectors. In fact, the Isle of Man's rarest stamp is the King George V £5 from 1921. According to Barefoot, only seven used examples exist.

=== 1966–1976 ===
A new set of revenue stamps was issued on 5 July 1966. Unlike the previous issues, these were not key types, but each value had a different colour and design:

- 6d – Peel Castle
- 1/- – Tynwald Hill (commemorating Godred Crovan)
- 2/- – The Nunnery (commemorating Sir George Goldie)
- 2/6 – Bible in Manx (commemorating Rev Philip Moore)
- 5/- – Lifeboat (commemorating Sir William Hillary)
- 10/- – HMS Victory (commemorating Captain John Quilliam)
- £1 – William Christian
- £2 – Castle Rushen
- £5 – Queen Elizabeth II, and a triskelion superimposed on a Celtic cross

Although the Isle of Man switched to decimal currency in 1971 along with the United Kingdom, the first decimal series of revenues was not issued until 15 October 1974 as the previous issue remained in use. The new issue had four values:

- 5p – Old Grammar School, Castletown
- 10p – Tynwald Hill
- 25p – St German's Cathedral
- 50p – Lady Isabella, a waterwheel

These replaced the 1/-, 2/-, 5/- and 10/- values of the previous issue. Meanwhile, the pound values remained in use.

With the exception of the £5 stamp of 1966, none of the above stamps bore an inscription indicating they were revenue stamps. To prevent people from attempting to use them for postage, on 18 June 1975 the four decimal stamps issued in 1974 (5p, 10p, 25p and 50p) and two of the pound values from 1966 (£1 and £2) were issued overprinted REVENUE.

On 1 November 1976, a new set inscribed ISLE OF MAN REVENUE was issued. It consisted of seven values (5p, 10p, 25p, 50p, £1, £2 and £5), which depicted coins, heraldic symbols, ships or castles. This was the last set of Isle of Man revenues ever issued.

Unlike the keytypes, the 1966–76 issues were sold to collectors in presentation packs or as singles in mint condition, and therefore unused stamps are more commonly found. However they are still harder to find in used condition.

== National Insurance ==
The Isle of Man also issued contribution stamps for National Insurance and its predecessor schemes. In around 1920, British National Health Insurance stamps were overprinted for use on the island, and these were replaced by overprints on British Health & Pensions Insurance stamps in around 1930. After National Insurance was established in 1948, British issues were once again overprinted. From 1969 onwards, a new design depicting the triskelion was issued, although overprints on British issues also continued. Hundreds of National Insurance stamps were issued until the 1970s, and many of them are rare.

== See also ==
- Postage stamps and postal history of the Isle of Man
- Revenue stamps of Guernsey
- Revenue stamps of Jersey
- Revenue stamps of the United Kingdom
