= Postage stamps and postal history of Bangladesh =

Bangladesh first issued its own postage stamps during the Bangladesh Liberation War from Mujibnagar on 29 July 1971.

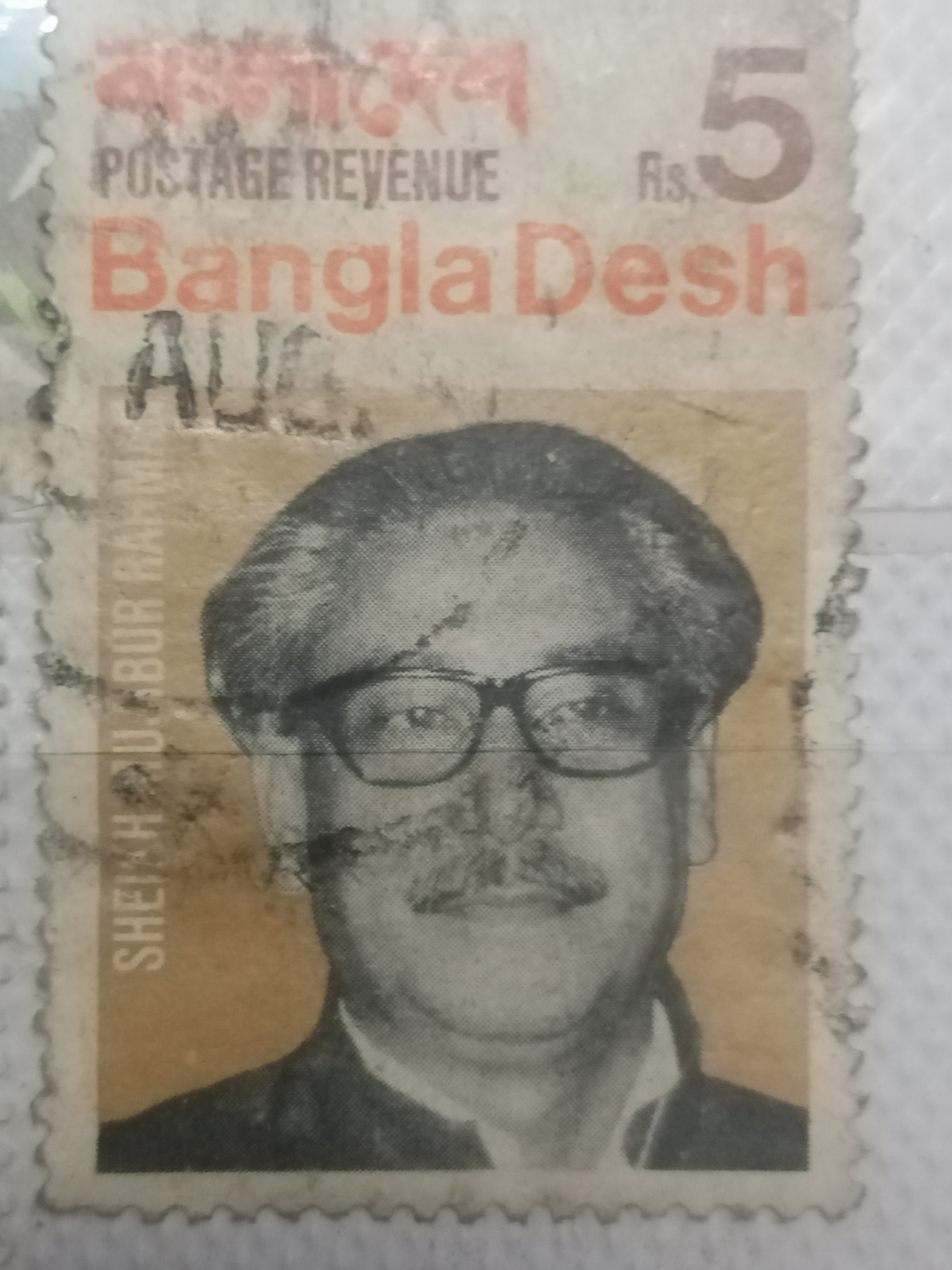
First ever postage stamp denominated in rupees published on 29 July 1971

Later, upon gaining independence in 1971 more stumps were published. A set of eight stamps, with various motifs including a map of the country, were issued.

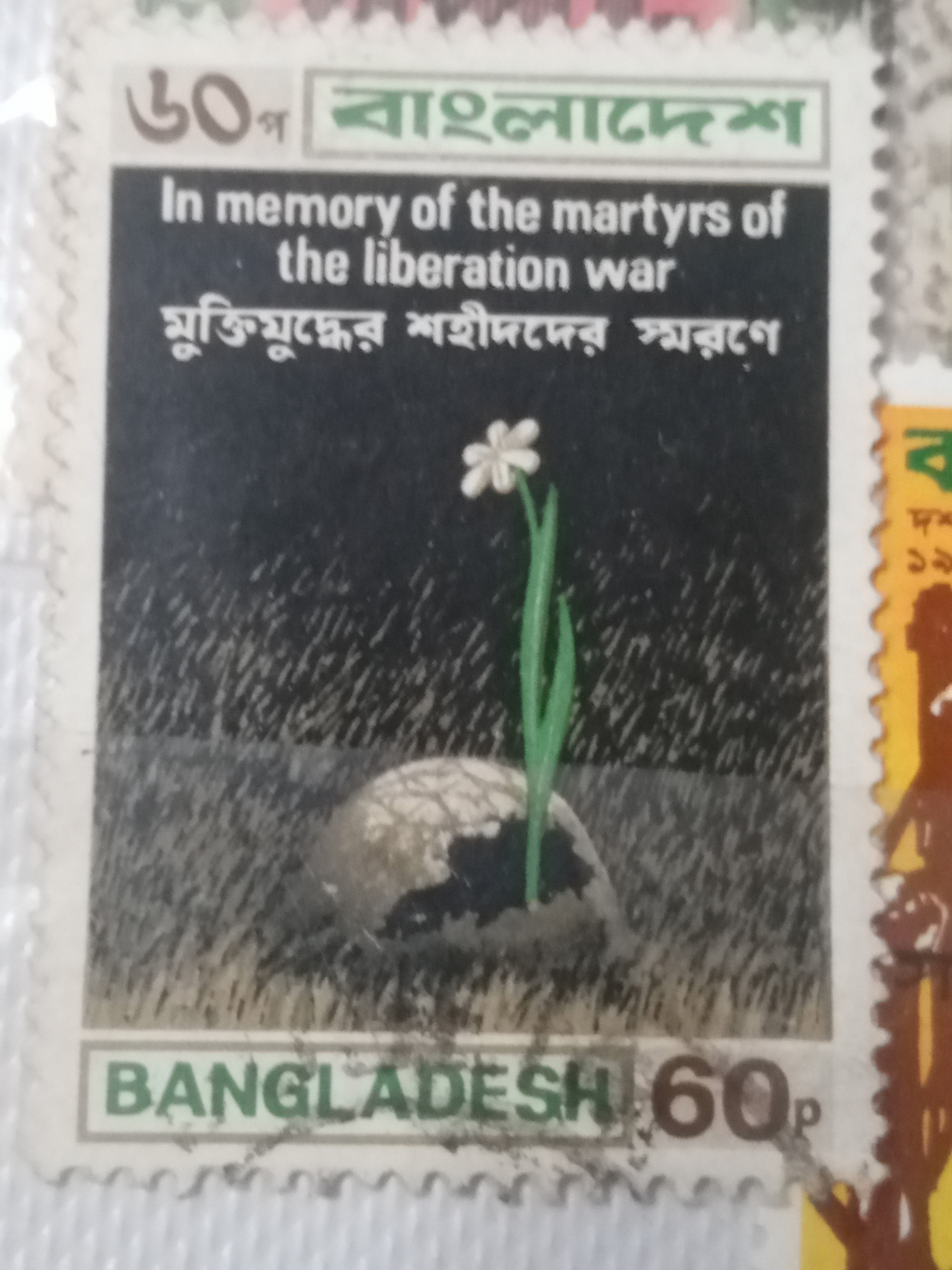
Stamp Commemorating the Bangladesh Liberation War

Shortly after, stamps in eight values were overprinted "Bangladesh Liberated" in both English and Bengali were prepared in the United Kingdom, but only three values were issued in Bangladesh.

== Overprints ==
While the initial stamps were being produced, local postmasters were authorised to overprint the Pakistani stamps that they had in stock with the name of their new country. This practice led to a large number of varieties, not catalogued in the major stamp catalogues. These provisional issues ceased to be valid from 30 April 1973. Overprinted postal stationery was withdrawn and demonetized from 7 October 1974.

== First stamps ==
The first stamps of the country were issued in rupees (1 rupee = 100 paisa) on 29 July 1971, but in 1972 a new currency was introduced (1 taka = 100 poisha) and since then all stamps have been inscribed with taka or poisha values.

== Issuing policy ==
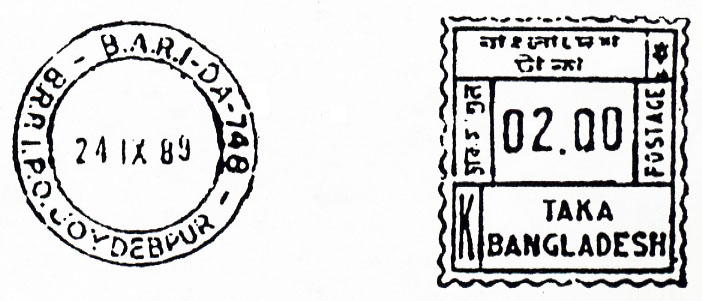
A Bangladeshi meter stamp

Since the first 1971 issue, the Bangladeshi postal authorities have maintained a conservative issuing policy. Just over 900 individual stamps and miniature sheets were listed in the regular Stanley Gibbons catalogues by 2008, plus approximately 50 issues overprinted "Official" for Governmental use. No stamp booklets have yet been produced.

The majority of themes featured on Bangladeshi stamps have been locally based; these are interspersed with occasional general thematic issues (e.g. fish, birds, etc.) and those for worldwide events (e.g. Olympic Games, football and cricket World Cups, etc.)

== See also ==
- Bangladesh National Philatelic Association
- Revenue stamps of Bangladesh
- Bangladesh Institute of Philatelic Studies

== References and sources ==
Sources

- Stanley Gibbons Ltd: various catalogues
- Encyclopaedia of Postal Authorities
