= Roger Booth =

Roger Booth may refer to:

- Roger Booth (philatelist), British philatelist
- Roger Booth (actor) (1933–2014), English television actor
