= H.M. Stationery Office Collection =

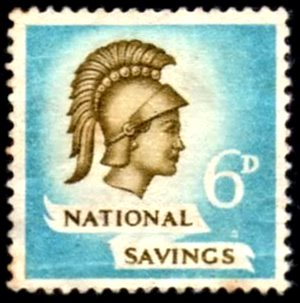
A 1951 British savings stamp (not from the H.M. Stationery Office Collection).

The H.M. Stationery Office Collection is a collection of British excise revenue material including National Savings and National Insurance stamps that forms part of the British Library Philatelic Collections. It was received from H.M.S.O. between 1982 and 1992.

== See also ==
- Contributions Agency Collection
- Revenue Society
- Revenue stamps of the United Kingdom
