= Revenue stamps of the British Solomon Islands =

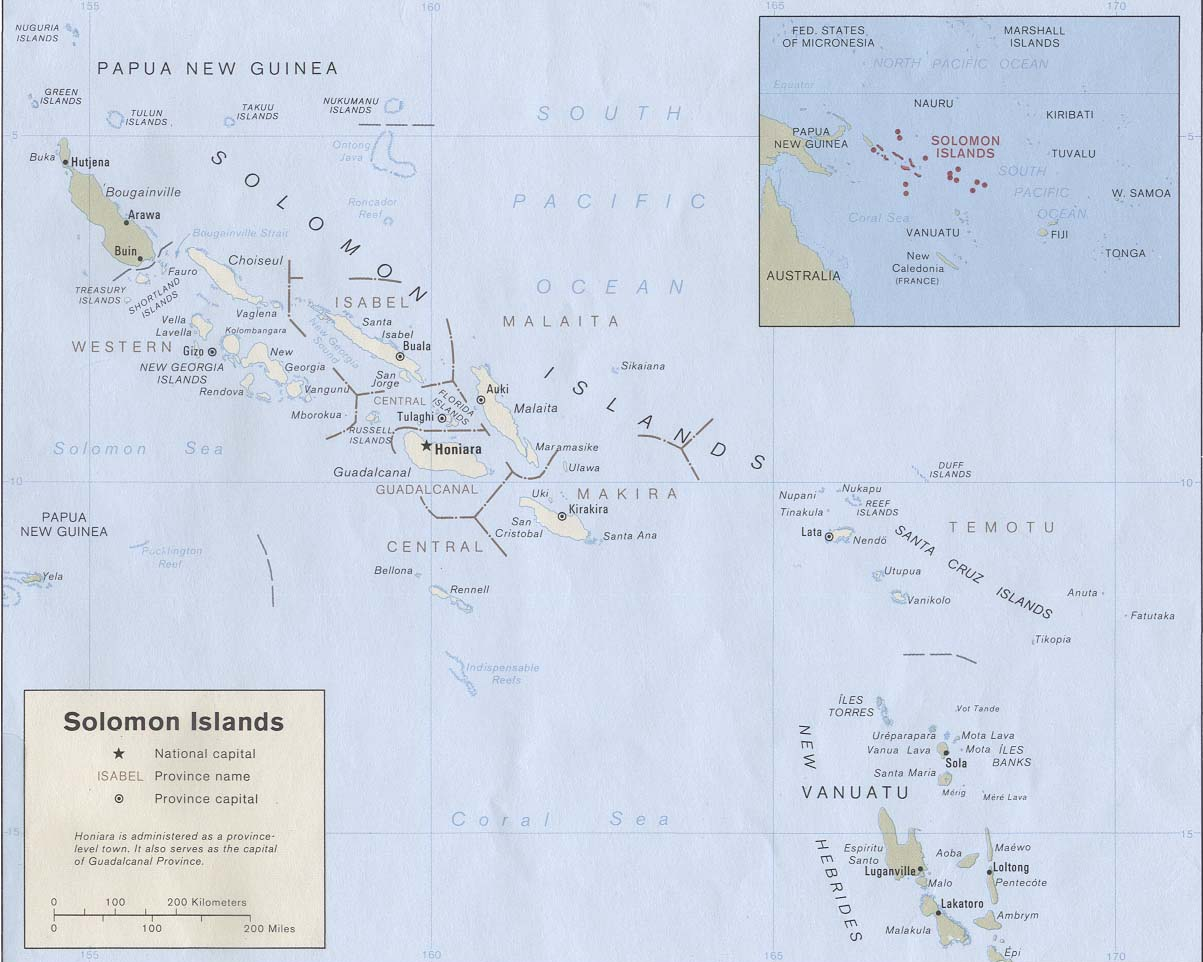
Map of the British Solomon Islands

Revenue stamps of the British Solomon Islands, now known as the Solomon Islands, were first issued in around 1926 when the islands were a British protectorate. The only revenue stamps issued by the islands were British embossed adhesives overprinted BRITISH SOLOMON ISLANDS in three lines. Five stamps are recorded: two versions of a 1s value issued in 1926 and 1931, and £5, £10 and £50 values issued in 1964. All are rare and command high prices.

The British Solomon Islands also used dual-purpose postage and revenue stamps.

No post-independence issues are recorded from the Solomon Islands.
