= Revenue stamps of Pakistan =

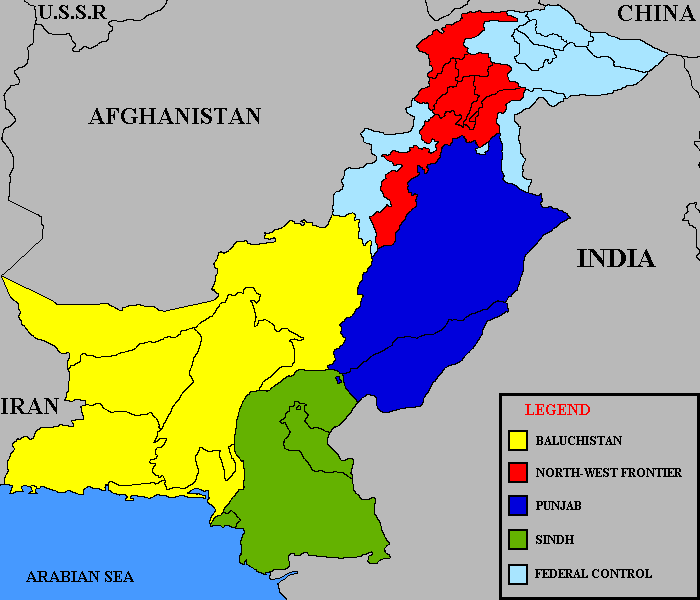
Map of Pakistan showing the provinces

Pakistan first issued revenue stamps when it became independent in 1947 and continues to issue revenues to this day. In addition to national issues, the provinces of Balochistan, North West Frontier, Punjab, Sindh, as well as Azad Jammu and Kashmir, West Pakistan and the capital Islamabad also have or had their own stamps.

Until 1947 Pakistan was part of India, and used Indian revenue stamps. A number of princely states which issued their own revenues also became part of Pakistan following independence, and therefore may also be considered as Pakistani forerunner issues. These include Bahawalpur and Las Bela. Prior to 1971, Pakistani national issues were used in both West Pakistan and East Pakistan. Later that year East Pakistan became the independent state of Bangladesh, which issues its own revenues to this day.

== National issues ==
Like Great Britain and India, some of Pakistan's revenues were keytypes. They showed the star and crescent, Pakistan's national insignia. They were used for the following purposes:

- Agreement (c.1950)
- Broker's Note (c.1950)
- Displaced Persons Adhesive (c.1950-c.1961)
- Foreign Bill (1947-c.1992)
- Identification Card (c.1990)
- Insurance (1947-c.1992)
- Notarial (1947-c.1992)
- Notarial High Court (c.1960)
- Refugee Adhesive (c.1950)
- Share Transfer (c.1947-c.1995)
- Special Adhesive (1947-2003)

Apart from keytypes, some types of revenue stamps had their own specific designs. These include:

- Attestation (c.1960)
- Central Excise Revenue (c.1958-c.1990)
- Court Fees (1948–present)
- Entertainment (c.1965-c.1972)
- Income Tax (1991-1992)
- Insurance (c.1995–present)
- National Identity Card (c.2010–present)
- Passport and Visa (c.1950)
- Revenue (1947–present)
- Welfare (c.1972)

== West Pakistan ==
Prior to Indo-Pakistani War of 1971 in 1971, the territory of modern-day Pakistan was known as West Pakistan (with Bangladesh being East Pakistan), and some revenue issues were made exclusively for this area. Around 1956, Bahawalpur Court Fee, Notarial and Receipt stamps were overprinted for use in the new state. Later Pakistani Court Fee stamps were overprinted for use as Arms Licence stamps in West Pakistan. In 1969 and 1970, stamps were issued for Arms Licence, Driving Licence and Motor Vehicles Tax, and these were in use before being replaced by separate issues for the provinces in 1971.

== Provincial issues ==
=== Azad Jammu and Kashmir ===
Azad Jammu and Kashmir's only revenue stamps were regular Pakistani issues overprinted for use in the state, either in English or in Urdu. There were issues for the following taxes:

- Court Fees
- Revenue
- Special Adhesive

=== Balochistan ===
Balochistan's first revenue stamp issues were in 1971. Since that year, stamps have been issued annually to pay for the following:

- Arms Licence
- Driving Licence
- Motor Vehicles Fitness Certificate
- Motor Vehicles Tax
- Route Permit

Issues from 1971 to 2012 were inscribed Government of Baluchistan. Since 2013, most stamps have the spelling changed to Government of Balochistan, however the 2013 and 2014 Driving Licence issues still retain the old spelling.

=== Islamabad Capital Territory ===
Islamabad's first revenue stamp issues were in 2002. Since that year, stamps have been issued annually to pay for the following:

- Arms Licence
- Driving Licence
- Motor Vehicles Fitness Certificate

All issues are inscribed Government of Pakistan Islamabad. Stamps might also exist for Route Permit but these have not yet been recorded.

=== North West Frontier Province ===
North West Frontier's first revenue stamp issues were in 1971. Since that year, stamps have been issued annually to pay for the following:

- Arms Licence
- Driving Licence
- Motor Vehicles Fitness Certificate
- Motor Vehicles Tax

Issues are inscribed Government of the N.W.F.P. or Government of N.W.F.P. Stamps might also exist for Route Permit but these have not yet been recorded.

=== Punjab ===
Punjab's first revenue stamp issues were in 1971. Since that year, stamps have been issued annually to pay for the following:

- Arms Licence
- Driving Licence
- Motor Vehicles Fitness Certificate
- Motor Vehicles Tax
- Route Permit
- NADRA Documents
- Educational Institutions

All issues are inscribed Government of the Punjab.

=== Sindh ===
Sindh's first revenue stamp issues were in 1971. Since that year, stamps have been issued annually to pay for the following:

- Arms Licence
- Driving Licence
- Motor Vehicles Fitness Certificate
- Motor Vehicles Tax
- Route Permit

Issues from 1971 to 1990 were inscribed Government of Sind, but from 1991 onwards the spelling was changed to Government of Sindh.

From the 1990s onwards Sindh has also issued stamps to pay for shooting permits. These do not follow the 'keytype' designs and are not issued annually.

== See also ==
- Postage stamps and postal history of Pakistan
- Revenue stamps of India
- Revenue stamps of Bangladesh
