= Revenue stamps of Ireland =

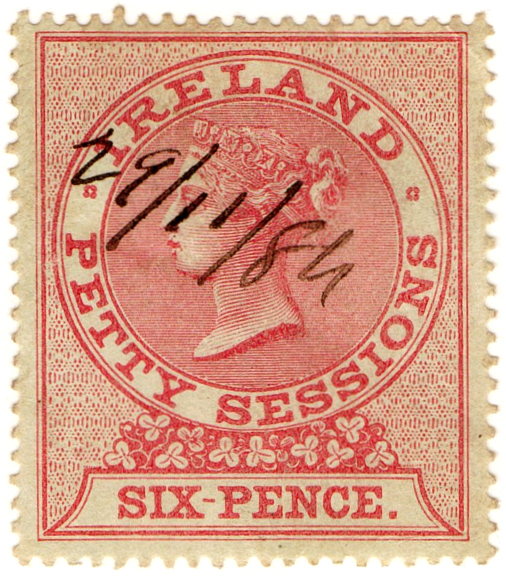
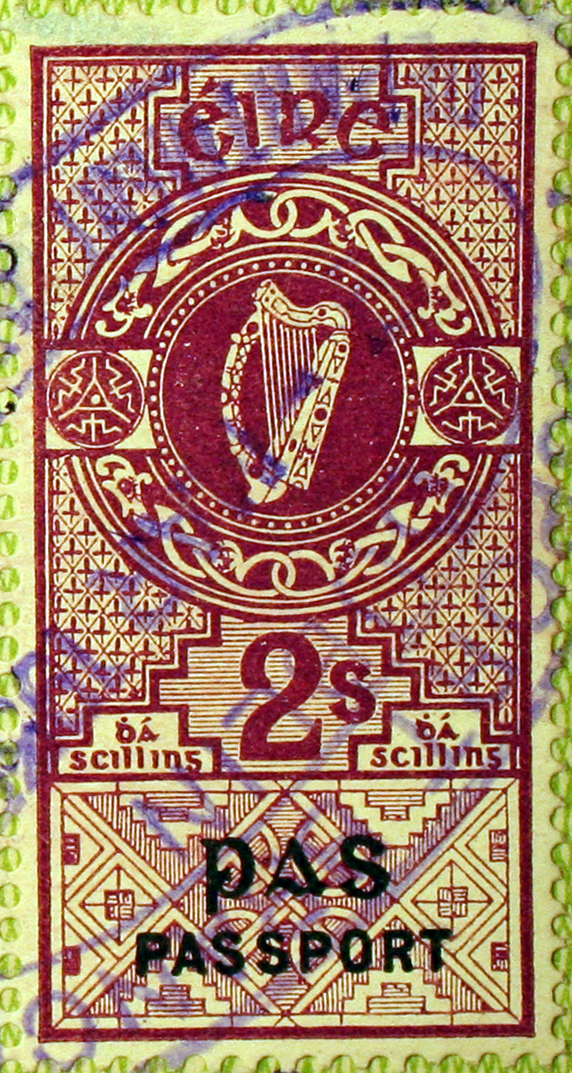
Ireland used revenue stamps both when it was part of the United Kingdom (left: Petty Sessions stamp used in 1884) and after independence (right: Passport stamp used in 1939)

Revenue stamps were issued in Ireland since 1774. These include issues by the Kingdom of Ireland, issues by the United Kingdom specifically for use in Ireland or briefly Southern Ireland, and issues of an independent southern Ireland since 1922 (including the Provisional Government of Ireland, the Irish Free State and the Republic of Ireland).

== Union with Britain ==
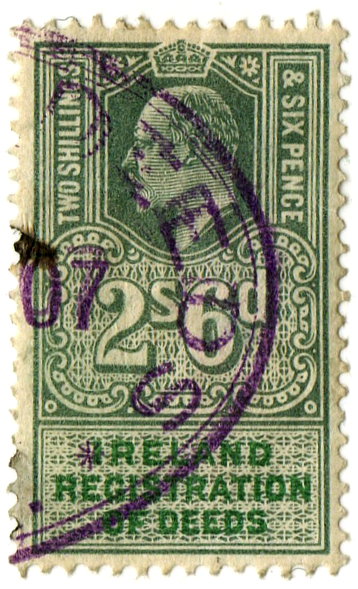
2s6d Registration of Deeds key type stamp depicting Edward VII, issued 1902

In the 18th century, Ireland was an independent kingdom in personal union with and a de facto client state of the Kingdom of Great Britain, and in 1801 both kingdoms were merged into the United Kingdom of Great Britain and Ireland. During this period, some revenue stamps of the United Kingdom – both directly embossed or adhesive – were used in Ireland. However, since the island had many unique branches of the legal system, it required its own revenue stamps for some uses.

The first revenue stamps specifically for use in Ireland were impressed duty stamps introduced in 1774 to pay for stamp duty. Like British issues, the stamps could be embossed directly onto a document or on pieces of coloured paper with a cypher label at the back. Initially, colourless embossing was used although later on coloured ink was also used. Embossed adhesives were introduced in 1858, and these were either inscribed IRELAND or were regular British issues but with die letters which were exclusively used in Ireland only.

Apart from general duty stamps, there were also directly embossed revenue stamps for Affidavit, Bankers Note or Bill, Bonds, Chancery Fee Fund, Civil Bill Duty, the Court of Bankruptcy and Insolvency, Enrolment, Intermediate Education, Judgements Registry, Law Fund, Lease, Lunacy Fee, Protests, Record of Titles, Registration of Deeds, the Supreme Court of Judicature, and Writ. Embossed adhesives were also used for Admiralty Court, Chancery Fee Fund, Petty Sessions and Registration of Deeds.

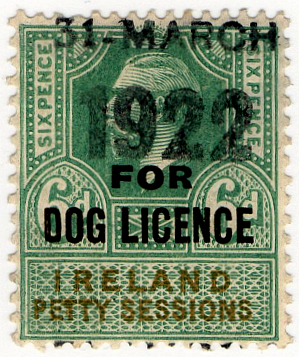
6d Dog Licence Registration stamp (overprinted on a Petty Sessions key type depicting George V), used in 1922

British key types specifically inscribed for use in Ireland were first issued in 1873, a year after key types were introduced in Britain. These depicted the reigning monarch, initially Queen Victoria and later King Edward VII and King George V, and they remained in use until the partition of Ireland. Key types were issued for Bankruptcy, County Courts, Judicature, Land Commission, Land Registry, Petty Sessions (some of which were overprinted for Dog Licence Registration), Records, Registration of Deeds, Registration of Title and Registration of Title Insurance Fund.

British Admiralty Court, Chancery Court and Judicature stamps were also overprinted for use in Ireland. In addition, specific designs depicting Queen Victoria were also used for Admiralty Court, Chancery Fee Fund, Petty Sessions, Record of Titles and Registration of Deeds. Dog licence stamps depicting an Irish Wolfhound were introduced in 1865 and remained in use until partition.

Following partition, the following George V key types were issued for Southern Ireland in 1921–22: Civil Service, Companies Registration, Contract Note, County Courts, Estate Duty, Foreign Bill, Judicature, Land Registry, Official Arbitration and Petty Sessions. At this point, revenue stamps of Northern Ireland were also introduced, and these continued to be issued until the late 20th century.

== Irish Free State and Republic ==
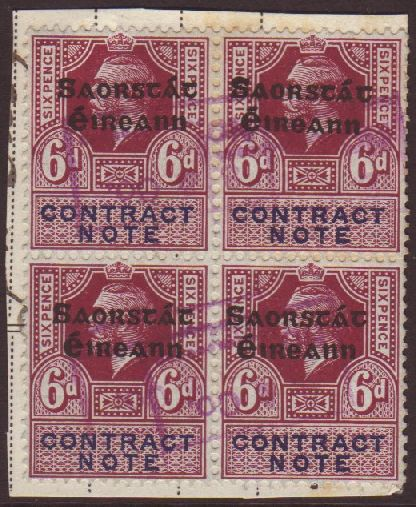
A block of British 6d Contract Note stamps with a Saorstát Éireann overprint, issued 1922

Following the Irish War of Independence, Ireland was partitioned and in 1922, the southern part fell under the administration of the Provisional Government of Ireland (Irish: Rialtas Sealadach na hÉireann). Various revenue stamps, either Irish issues as described above or regular British issues, were therefore overprinted accordingly. Rialtas overprints can therefore be found on Bankruptcy, Civil Service, Companies Registration, Contract Note, County Courts, Dog Licence Registration, Excise, Foreign Bill, Health & Pensions Insurance, Judicature, Land Registry, National Health Insurance, Official Arbitration, Petty Sessions, Records, Registration of Deeds and Unemployment Insurance stamps.

The Irish Free State (Irish: Saorstát Éireann) was established at the end of 1922, and British or Irish revenues were once again similarly overprinted. Saorstát overprints may be found on Contract Note, County Courts, Dog Licence Registration, Estate Duty, Excise, Foreign Bill, Judicature, Land Commission, Land Registry, National Health Insurance, Petty Sessions, Public Records, Registration of Deeds and Unemployment Insurance stamps.

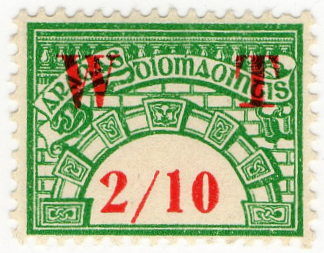
1960 Wet Time unemployment insurance stamp overprinted 2/10

The Southern Ireland issues and the Rialtas and Saorstát overprints include some of Ireland's rarest revenues. For example, only one copy has been recorded of the 6d Dog Licence Registration stamp with the Rialtas overprint.

Key type stamps depicting the Celtic harp, a national symbol of Ireland, were introduced in 1925, and these were issued for Bankruptcy, Circuit Court, Companies Registration, Consular Service, Contract Note, Court of Justice, Customs, District Court of Justice, Estate Duty, Film Censorship, Foreign Bill, Judicature, Land Commission, Land Registry, Official Arbitration, Passport, Public Records, Registration of Deeds and State Service. Some key types had inscriptions in both Irish and English, with others being inscribed solely in Irish. Some remained in use after decimalization in 1971, with the last stamps being issued in the 1980s.

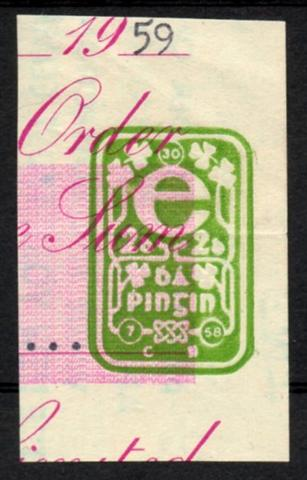
2d impressed duty stamp used in 1959

Another design featuring the harp, but smaller than the regular key types was also used for Customs Entry Duty, Customs Late Fee and Old Age Pensions between 1924 and the 1960s. Ireland also issued embossed adhesives in the 1920s, and continued to use impressed duty stamps for a number of decades after independence. A postage stamp was also overprinted for use as a Passport stamp in around 1930. Apart from these, stamps with specific designs were also used for Animal Slaughter fees, Children's Allowance, Excise, Exported Livestock Levy, Income Tax, National Insurance and Unemployment Insurance. Excise stamps have been issued for various purposes, including entertainments taxes and taxes on cigarettes, and stamps for the latter are still in use today.

== See also ==
- Revenue stamps of Northern Ireland
- Postage stamps of Ireland
