= Revenue stamps of Scotland =

Revenue stamps were issued in Scotland, a constituent country of the United Kingdom, between 1871 and the 1970s. Regular revenue stamps of the United Kingdom were widely used throughout the country, but revenue stamps for exclusive use in Scotland were issued for Law Courts and Register House.

Register House stamps were issued to prepay deeds registration fees relating to property. They were first issued in 1871, and consisted of embossed adhesives of Great Britain underprinted REGISTER HOUSE SCOTLAND. In 1873, a set of key types depicting Queen Victoria with the appropriate inscription was issued. There are four sets of Queen Victoria key types, two of which also incorporated the thistle, a symbol of Scotland, in the design. Other sets of key types were issued in subsequent years, with the portraits of reigning monarchs: Edward VII in 1903, George V in 1921, George VI in 1947 and Elizabeth II in 1959.

All Law Courts stamps were key types, with the first issue being in 1873. These were simply inscribed LAW COURTS, making no reference to Scotland despite only being in use there. Like the Register House stamps, there are four sets of Queen Victoria stamps and a set each for Edward VII, George V and George VI. Stamps depicting Queen Elizabeth II denominated in pre-decimal currency were issued in 1959, and a final set in decimal currency was issued in 1971. This last set was additionally inscribed with the name of the country.

== See also ==
- Revenue stamps of the United Kingdom
