= Revenue stamps of Northern Ireland =

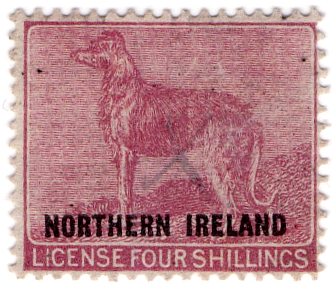
4/- Dog Licence stamp

Revenue stamps were issued in Northern Ireland, a constituent country of the United Kingdom. From 1774, various revenue stamps of Ireland were used throughout both Northern and Southern Ireland, while revenue stamps of the United Kingdom were also used to pay for some taxes and fees.

Upon the partition of Ireland in 1921, separate revenue stamps began to be issued for both Northern Ireland and Southern Ireland. The latter were withdrawn soon afterwards upon the establishment of the Provisional Government, but the former continued to issue revenue stamps until the late 20th century. The need for separate issues for Northern Ireland came about since taxes raised there were meant to remain in the country. Most Northern Irish revenue stamps were British key types with appropriate inscriptions, but there were a number of different issues as well.

== Key types ==
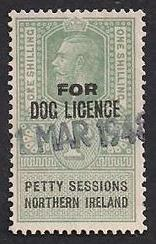
1/- Dog Licence Registration stamp, overprinted on a George V Petty Sessions key type

The vast majority of Northern Ireland revenue stamps were British key types additionally inscribed NORTHERN IRELAND. In 1921, stamps were issued for Bankruptcy, Civil Service, Companies Registration, Contract Note, County Courts, Estate Duty, Foreign Bill, Judicature, Land Commission, Land Registry, Official Arbitration, Petty Sessions (including overprints for Dog Licence) and Registration of Deeds.

Most of the 1921 issues depicted the reigning monarch, King George V, but some Contract Note and Petty Sessions stamps depicting King Edward VII were also issued, since they were printed on older stocks.

Later issues depicted the then-current monarch, King George VI and later Queen Elizabeth II. Until 1950, Registration of Deeds stamps simply inscribed IRELAND were still being issued, but these were only valid in Northern Ireland. Upon decimalization in 1971, stamps were issued for Bankruptcy, Contract Note, County Court, Dog Licence, Judicature Fee, Land Registry, Petty Sessions and Registration of Deeds. These were withdrawn gradually, for example Dog Licence stamps were discontinued in 1983.

== Other issues ==
Apart from key types, Northern Ireland also issued overprints on a few British or Irish issues. In the 1920s, overprints were produced on British Excise stamps and Foreign Bill key types, as well as on Irish Dog Licence stamps depicting the Irish Wolfhound. In the 1960s and 1970s, many National Insurance stamps of Great Britain were also overprinted.

A set of excise stamps depicting the Red Hand of Ulster were also issued in around the 1930s. These were the only adhesive revenues which had a distinctive design specifically used for Northern Ireland.

A number of impressed duty stamps were used in Northern Ireland, including both general-duty issues and those for specific purposes. Many of these bore both symbols typical of impressed stamps of the United Kingdom such as the Tudor Crown, along with exclusively Irish symbols such as the shamrock. Some issues depicted the royal coat of arms of the United Kingdom or the Red Hand of Ulster.

== See also ==
- Revenue stamps of the United Kingdom
- Revenue stamps of Ireland
