= Contributions Agency Collection =

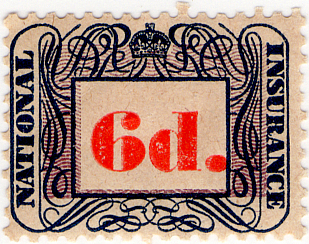
A 1948 British National Insurance stamp (not from the Contributions Agency Collection).

The Contributions Agency Collection is a collection of British National Insurance stamps that forms part of the British Library Philatelic Collections.

== See also ==
- Cinderella stamps
- H.M. Stationery Office Collection
- Revenue stamps of the United Kingdom
- Revenue Society
