= Savings stamp =

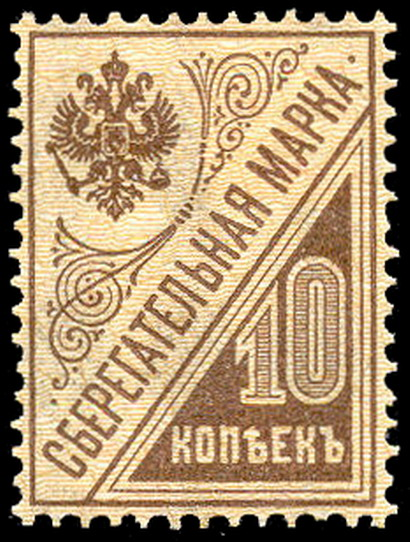
A Russian savings stamp from 1900

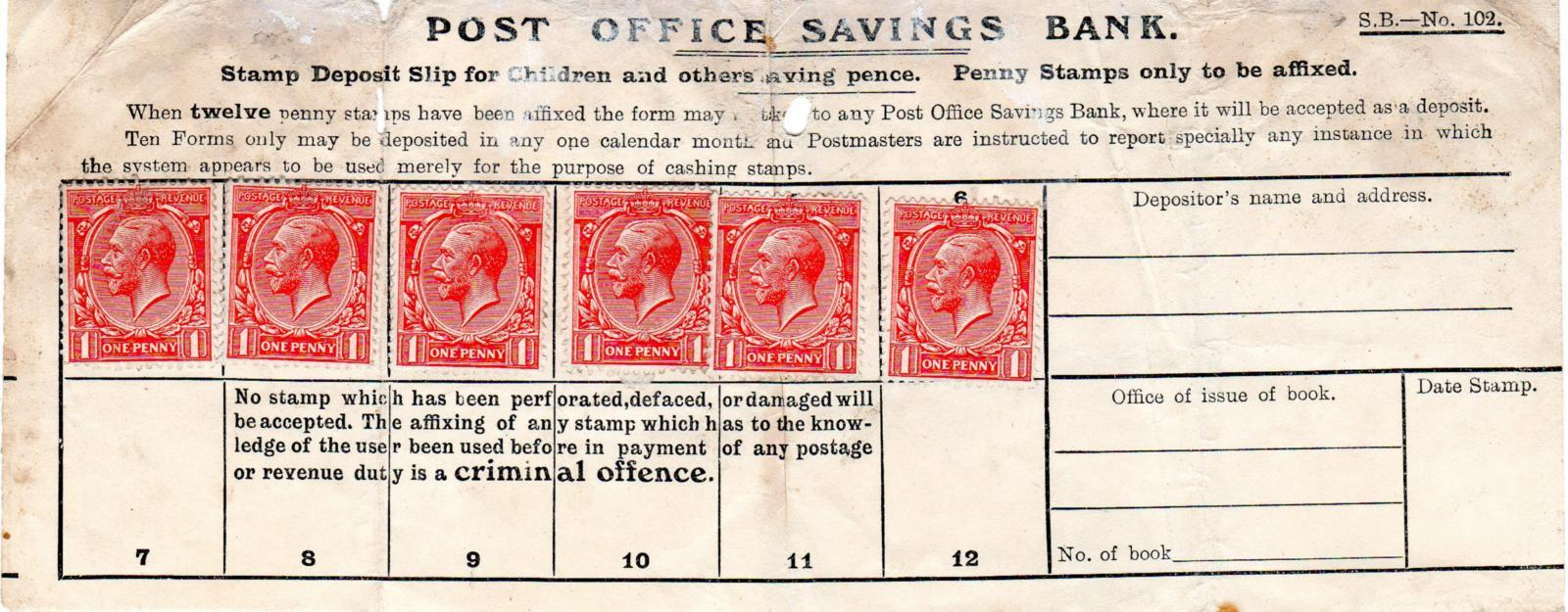
A British savings slip with space for twelve one penny stamps

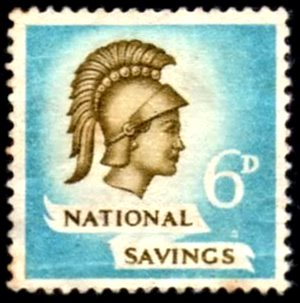
A British 1951 savings stamp

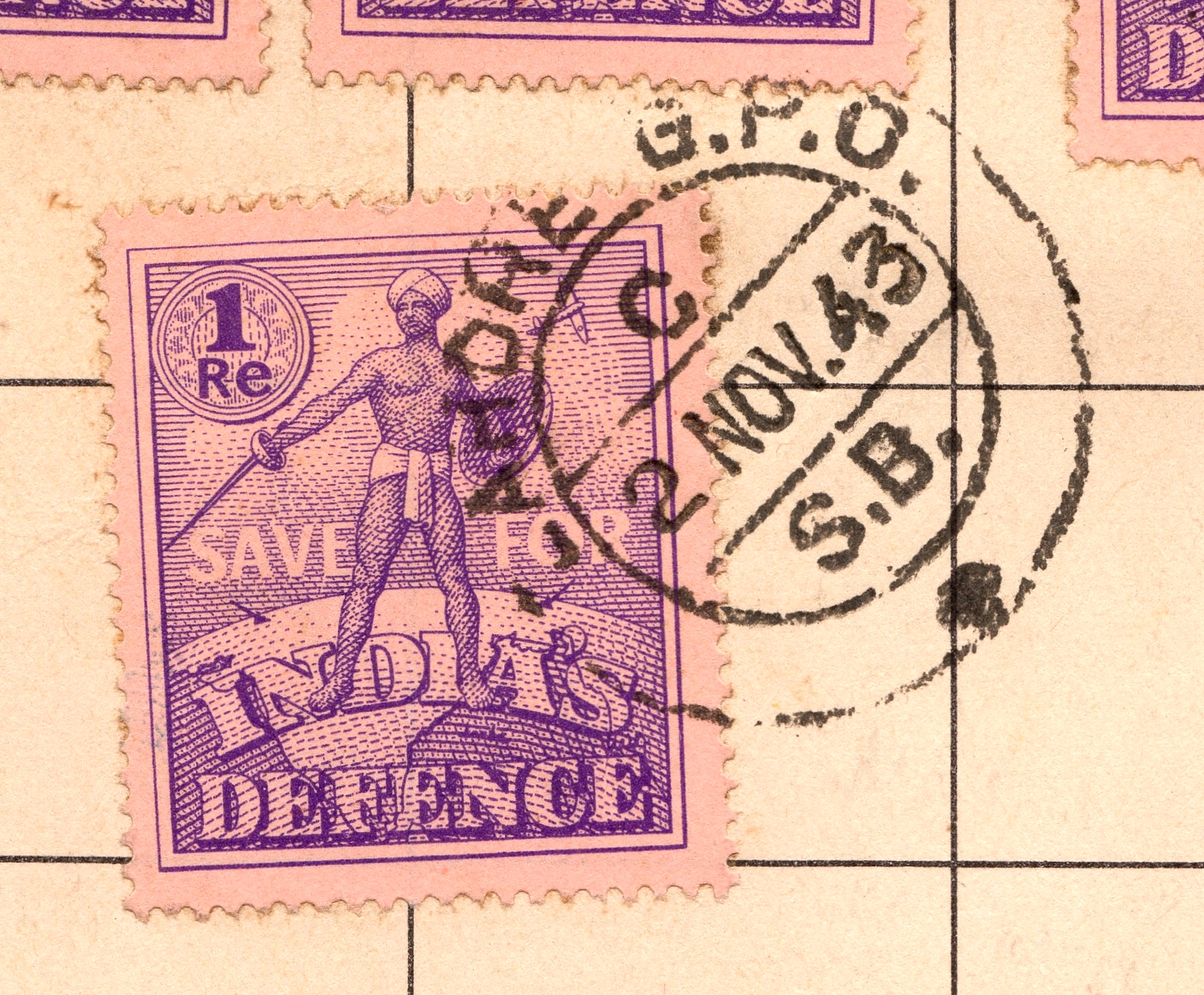
An Indian 1943 defence savings stamp

A savings stamp is a stamp issued by a government or other body to enable small amounts of money to be saved over time to accumulate a larger capital sum. The funds accumulated may then be used to make a larger purchase such as taking out a savings bond or to pay a large upcoming bill. Often issued in conjunction with post-office-run savings banks, savings stamps have also been issued by private companies. Supermarkets have issued the stamps to enable the spreading of large bills, package holiday companies have used them to enable customers to save for an annual holiday, and utilities companies have used the stamps to enable customers to spread the cost of their bills.

Savings stamps are not to be confused with trading stamps which provide a discount on goods purchased as part of a customer loyalty program.

In philately, savings stamps are regarded as a form of Cinderella stamp.

== In the United Kingdom ==
From 1880 ordinary penny postage stamps were used to save up one shilling (12 pence) which was then sufficient to open a Post Office Savings Bank account, although the minimum amount required changed to £1 in 1912. This scheme continued until after the Second World War but has now ended. In addition the Bank used specially designed savings stamps with higher values which also could be used to save enough to open an account.

Private companies in Britain also used savings stamps including the holiday company Butlins and supermarkets such as Sainsbury's and Safeway.

A wide variety of utility companies made use of the stamps, particularly regional electronic companies, but also British Telecom for telephone bills and government bodies for payment of National Insurance contributions or television licences.

Most uses of savings stamps have now ceased in the UK, replaced by electronic cards.

== In Ireland ==
A number of Irish credit unions offer a savings stamp scheme called Sammy Stamps, which are collected predominantly by children and sold through schools. Stamps can be credited to credit union accounts or cashed in at face value.

== In China ==
A number of savings stamps have been issued in China during 1940's.

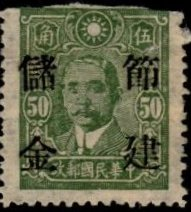
Saving Stamp in China

== In the United States ==
In the United States Postal Savings Stamps were introduced in 1911 and War Savings Stamps were issued during both World Wars. Savings stamps are worth their face amounts; the denominations are $0.10, $0.25, $0.50, $1, and $5. The sale of savings stamps was discontinued on June 30, 1970.

== Elsewhere ==
Belgium and France used special savings stamps in the 1880s and many other countries around the world have used them for diverse purposes, including Canada, India, Russia, Bulgaria and Singapore.

== War savings stamps ==
War savings stamps were issued by several British Commonwealth countries, including Gold Coast and India.

== See also ==
- H.M. Stationery Office Collection A collection of British savings stamps in the British Library Philatelic Collections
- Trading stamp
