= Revenue stamps of Bangladesh =

Bangladesh first issued revenue stamps in 1972, the year after independence, and continues to do so to this day. Previously there was no country named Bangladesh and it was part of India (till 1947) and part of Pakistan (from 1947 to 1971) and respective revenues were used. From 1921 to 1947 various Indian revenues were overprinted BENGAL for use in modern Bangladesh and West Bengal.

Since independence, Bangladesh has issued revenues for the following taxes:

- Airport Tax (1982–1988)
- Cigarette Tax (c.1972-c.1975)
- Court Fees (1973–1992)
- Entertainment Tax (c.1972 – 1988)
- Excise (1981–1986)
- Foreign Bill (1978-c.1992)
- Insurance (c.1978-c.1990)
- Notarial Fee (1977–1993)
- Passport and Visa (1972-c.1992)
- Radio (1981–1991)
- Revenue (1973–present)
- Share Transfer (1978-c.1982)
- Special Adhesive (1973–1987)
- Traffic Offence Fine (1990–2001)
- Vehicle Driving Licence (1977–1980)
- Vehicle Permit (1977–1992)
- Vehicle Tax (1977–1991)
- Vehicle Test Fee (1982–1991)
- Vehicle Transport (1990)

== See also ==
- Postage stamps and postal history of Bangladesh
- Revenue stamps of India
- Revenue stamps of Pakistan
- Online catalogue of Bangladesh Stamps.
- Online catalogue of Bangladesh Revenue Stamps.
