= Bangladesh National Philatelic Association =

The Bangladesh National Philatelic Association is a non-profit philatelic organisation in Bangladesh established in 1978. It has over one thousand members and is run by an executive panel of twelve members. It has issued more than one hundred philatelic publications since formation.

BNPA arranges national and regional philatelic exhibitions and holds monthly auctions in the capital Dhaka.

The membership fee is 200 TK year (general member) or 2500 TK (Life member).

BNPA is arranging Philatelic get together cum Auction on 1st and 3rd Friday of every month.

== See also ==
- Postage stamps and postal history of Bangladesh
