= Treasury Excise Correspondence Collection =

The Treasury Excise Correspondence Collection is a collection of correspondence between the United Kingdom Treasury and Excise, dated between 1826 and the 1840s, that forms part of the British Library Philatelic Collections. The collection shows a wide variety of postal marks and rates and was transferred from Her Majesty's Customs & Excise in 1992.

== See also ==
- H.M. Customs and Excise Collection
