= H.M. Customs and Excise Collection =

British revenue stamps collection at the British Library

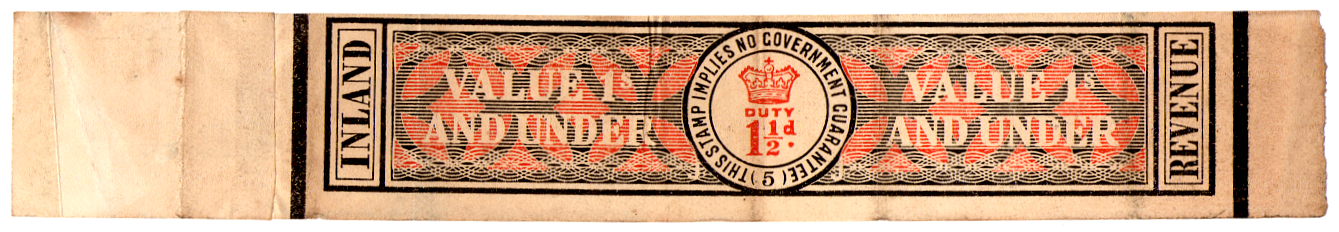
An 1897 British Medicine Duty revenue stamp (not from the H.M. Customs and Excise Collection).

The H.M. Customs and Excise Collection is a collection of British revenue stamps in proof or registration form for Table Water Duty, Medicine Tax, Playing Card Tax and other duties. It forms part of the British Library Philatelic Collections and was transferred to the Library by H.M. Customs & Excise in 2002.

== See also ==
- Revenue Society
- Revenue stamps of the United Kingdom
- Treasury Excise Correspondence Collection
