= Booth Papers =

The Booth Papers are a collection of philatelic research documents of Roger Booth FRPSL used for the preparation of his catalogues of British and Irish revenue stamps. The papers form part of the British Library Philatelic Department Collections and were donated to the Library in 2004.

== See also ==
- Revenue stamps of the United Kingdom
