= Key plate =

Plate that prints the detail in an image

In printing, a key plate is the plate that prints the detail in an image.

When printing color images by combining multiple colored inks, the colored plates typically do not contain much image detail. The key plate, most often printed in black ink, provides the main lines, shading, and contrast, giving definition and sharpness to the image. In instances where black is not used, such as in some early two- or three-color processes, the key plate may use the darkest available ink. In these cases, the term "key plate" may also be referred to as "keystone".

== Historical significance ==
Key plates became historically important with the rise of chromolithography in the 19th century, where detailed and accurate registration between color layers was required. Traditionally, the key plate was engraved or etched by hand.

When printing color images by combining multiple colors of inks, the colored inks usually do not contain much detail. The key plate, which is usually impressed using black ink, provides the lines, contrast, or both, of the image. However, in printing in which black is not used (common in early two- and three-color printing), the key plate could use the darkest of the colors used.

== See also ==
- CMYK color model
- Key type stamp
