= Revenue stamps of India =

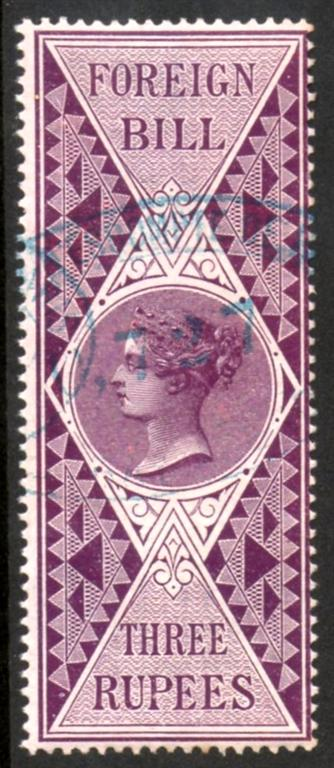
An 1861 3 Rupee Foreign Bill stamp of British India.

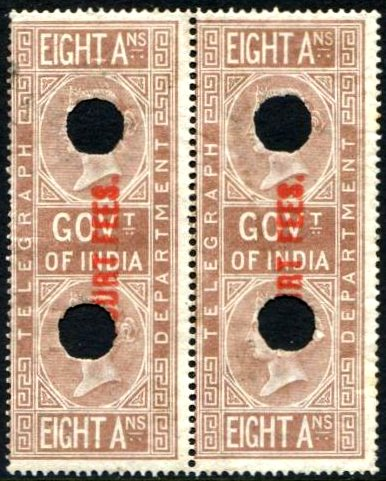
A pair of Telegraph stamps overprinted for use as Court Fee stamps in 1870.

India has been a heavy user of revenue stamps, both before and after independence. The first revenues were issued in the mid-nineteenth century and they are still being issued to this day. Apart from issues for the whole of India, many princely states, provinces and other states also had or still have their own revenue stamp issues.

== Before independence ==
Before independence, Indian revenue stamps were closely modelled on similar designs from Great Britain, often using a key type design. Key types were used for several types of revenue, including:

- Agreement
- Broker's Note
- Consular
- Custodian's Fee
- Entertainments (special issues for Bengal, Bombay and the United Provinces)
- Foreign Bill
- High Court Notarial
- Insurance
- Notarial
- Revenue (Bombay only)
- Share Transfer
- Small Cause Court (Calcutta only)
- Special Adhesive (including overprints for Vakil)

Some taxes, however, had special stamps, and these were:

- Central Excise
- Court Fees (including issues for Copies and Service)
- Customs
- Foreign Bill
- Forest Department
- High Court (including issues for Advocate, Attorney and Notarial)
- Insurance Agent Licence Fee
- Match Tax
- Notarial
- Petition
- Postal Note
- Postal Service
- Revenue (or Receipt)
- Share Transfer
- Small Cause Court (including special issues for Calcutta and Madras)
- Special Adhesive (including overprints for Vakil)
- Tobacco Excise

In addition, numerous revenue stamps of unique designs were issued by the Princely States of India.

== After independence ==
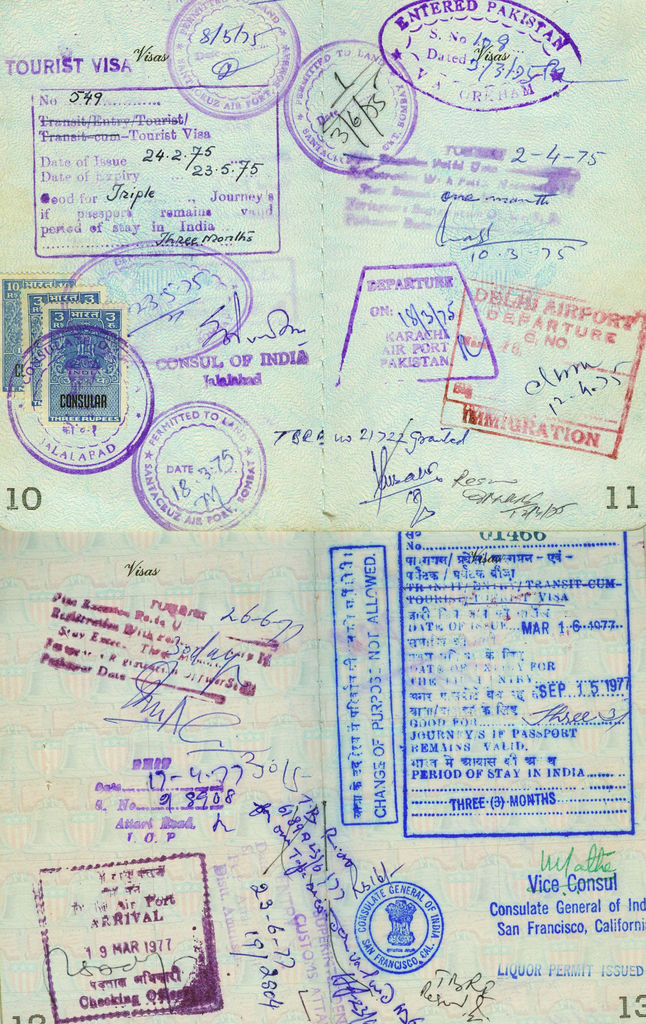
Consular stamps used on a passport page in 1975.

After independence, Indian revenue stamps changed to include the Lion Capital of Asoka but still using a key type format. Various different designs of keytypes were used, with the latest one being from around 2000 to this day. Keytypes were used for the following purposes:

- Agreement
- Broker's Note
- Consular
- Custodian's Fee
- Foreign Bill
- High Court Notarial
- Insurance
- Notarial
- Share Transfer
- Small Cause Court (Calcutta only)
- Special Adhesive

Of these, Insurance, Notarial, Special Adhesive as well as some others are still in use.

Special stamps were also used for several other purposes. These were:

- Broadcasting Radio Licence Fee
- Central Excise
- Central Recruitment Fee
- Customs
- Foreign Travel Tax (formerly Passenger Service Fee)
- Insurance
- Match Tax
- Passport
- Revenue
- Social Security
- Tobacco Excise

== State issues ==
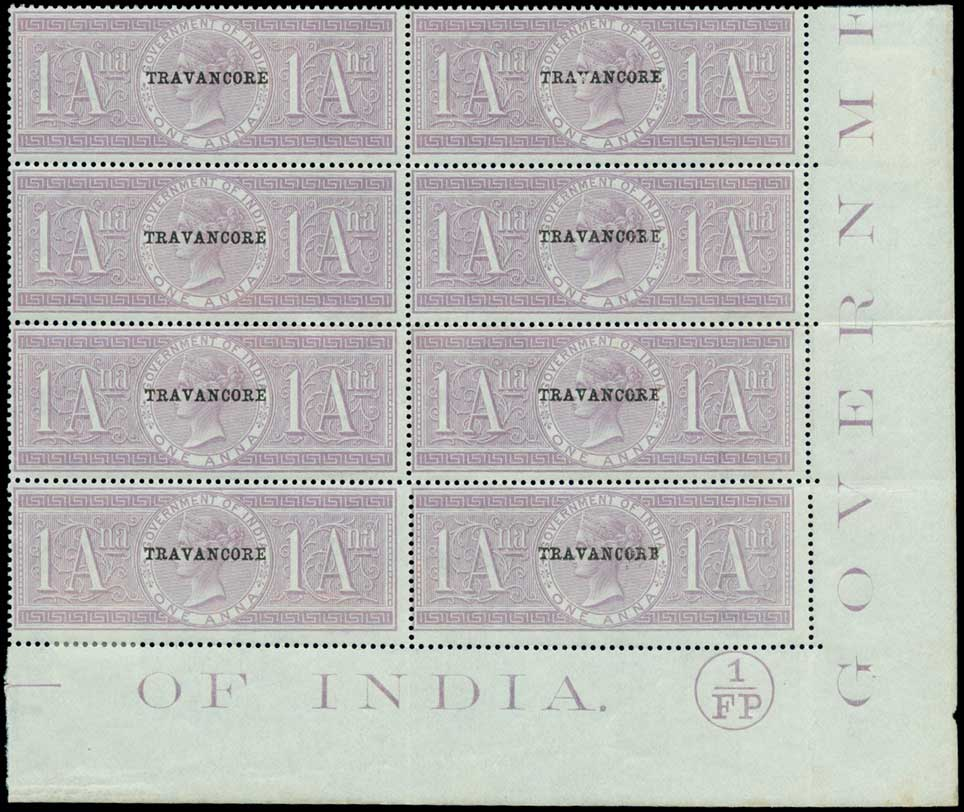
Travancore 1887 1a Special Adhesive stamps

At least 300 Indian princely states issued their own revenue stamps. Most of these stopped having separate revenues as they were dissolved after independence, however some states such as Jaipur and Sikkim continued to do so until the 1960s as they became states of independent India. The state of Jammu and Kashmir still has its own revenue stamps to this day due to its special status in article 370 of the Indian constitution. Some other states which were created after independence such as Assam and Madhya Bharat also issued stamps.

Meanwhile, many revenue issues both before and after independence exist with provincial or state overprints. Overprints are known from about 75 different states.

== Stamped paper and hundis ==
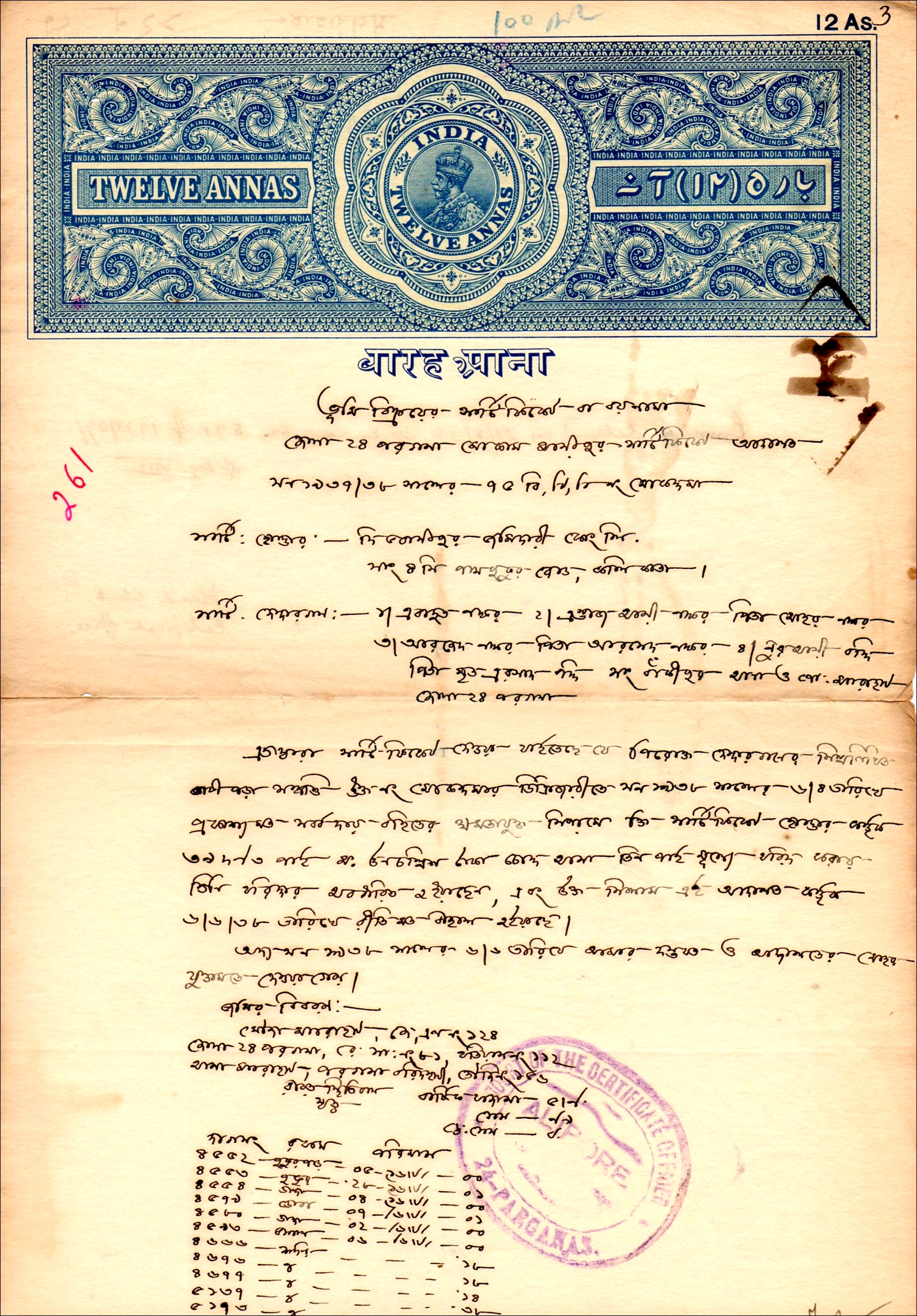
A used Indian 12 Anna stamped paper dated 1938.

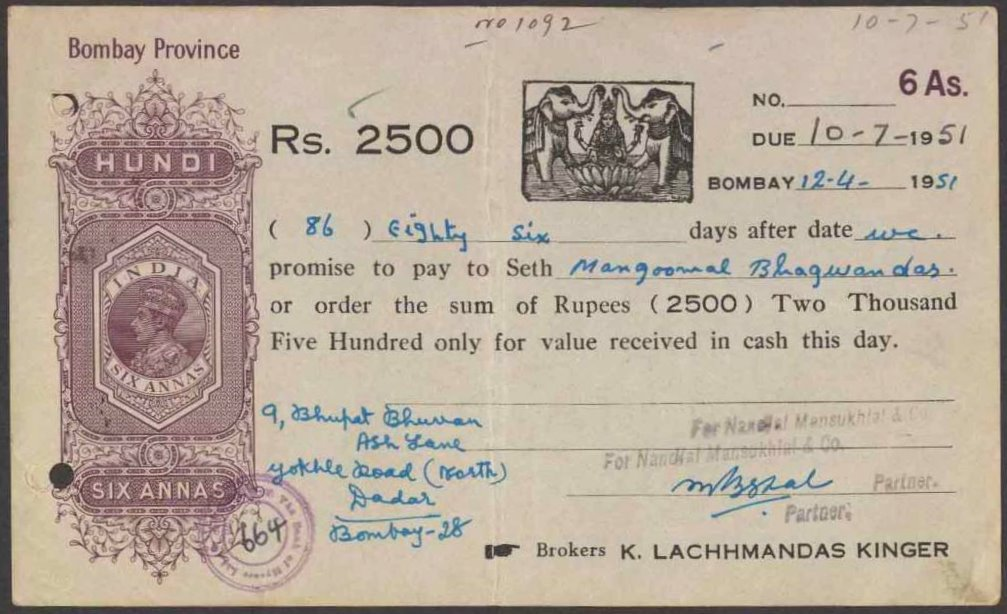
A 1951 hundi of Bombay Province for Rs 2500 with a pre-printed 6a revenue stamp.

India has been a very heavy user of stamped paper, both before and after independence.

In addition, hundis, an alternative money transmission system widely used in the Indian sub-continent, often bear a pre-printed revenue stamp.

== French and Portuguese India ==
French India had separate revenue stamps until 1954. After it became part of India, Pondicherry issued several revenues. Initially French India stamps were surcharged in Indian currency, and later separate stamps were issued inscribed either Timbre Mobile or Timbre Quittance. Later Pondicherry overprinted Indian revenues with the name of the state, anna stamps were used before and after independence denominations like 2annas, which will be gradually become part of revenue, later denominations like 10rs and 20rs in late '70s profusely but the introduction of these stamps in 1978 and later, higher denominations like 50rs and 100rs were having the highest capability in revenue and duties later and this continued to the 1980.

Portuguese India also issued its own revenues. In 1954, in Dadra and Nagar Haveli, Portuguese rule was overthrown by India and it issued a single revenue stamp. After the liberation of Goa in 1961, Portuguese Indian revenues were overprinted with new values in Indian currency for use as Court Fee or Revenue stamps. Later various Indian revenues were overprinted "Goa, Daman & Diu" for use in the former Portuguese territories. This continued until the 1970s.

== See also ==
- Postage stamps and postal history of India
- Revenue stamps of Bangladesh
- Revenue stamps of Pakistan
