= Key type stamp =

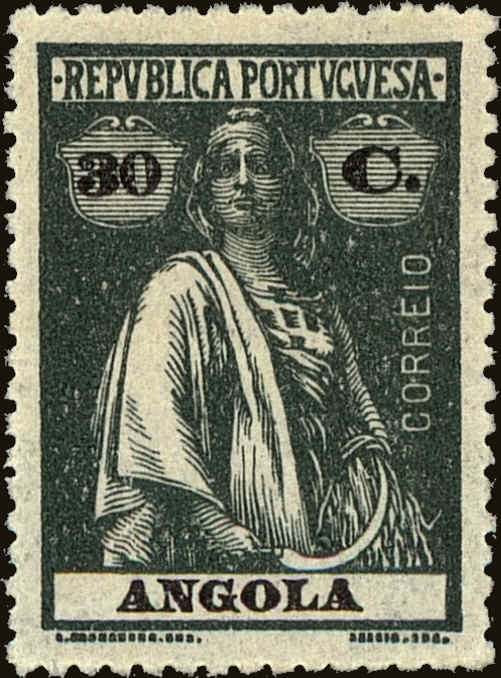
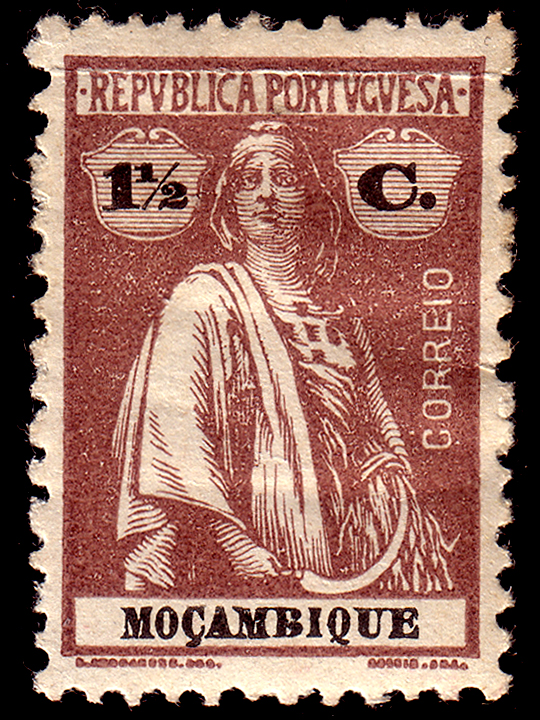
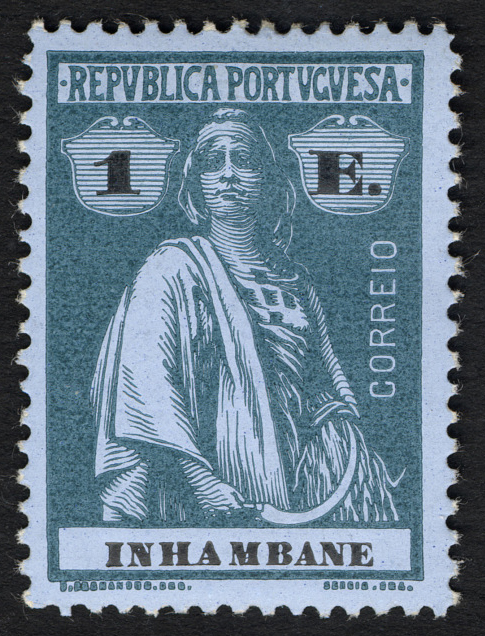
Three stamps of the Portuguese Ceres series issued for the colonies of Angola, Mozambique and Inhambane

Key type stamps are stamps of a uniform design that were widely used by colonial territories in the 19th and 20th centuries.

== Origins ==
The idea was invented by Perkins Bacon who used it to print stamps for Trinidad (1851), Barbados (1852) and Mauritius (1858), all featuring the same Britannia design.

== Key plate stamps ==
The idea was refined by De La Rue in 1879 when the printing process was split into two through the use of a key plate (or head plate) for the bulk of the design and a separate duty plate for the name of the colony and the value. These are often known as key plate stamps. While key type stamps are always of one colour due to being printed with a single plate, key plate stamps are printed with two plates and so can be printed with two different inks. This method has the advantage that most of the design remains the same in each variant of a stamp series with only the values, names and colours changing.

Key plate stamps were used extensively by Great Britain, Germany, France, Spain and Portugal.

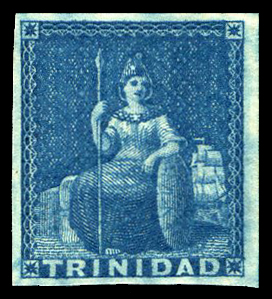
An unused Trinidad key type stamp showing Britannia

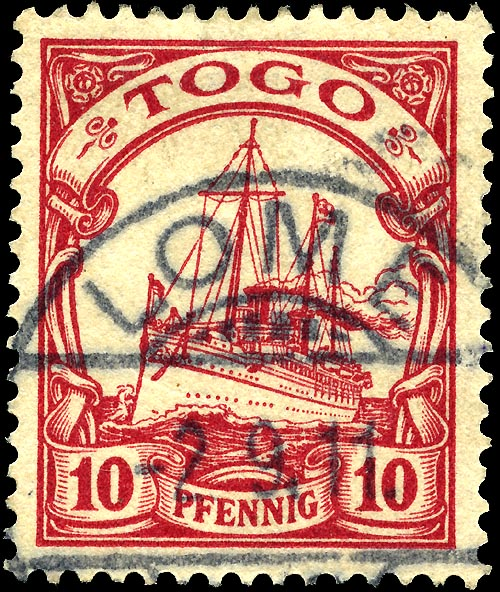
A used German key type stamp for Togo

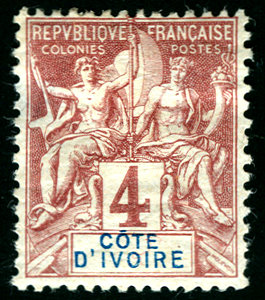
An 1892 4c stamp for Ivory Coast (Côte d'Ivoire) of the Navigation & Commerce key type series

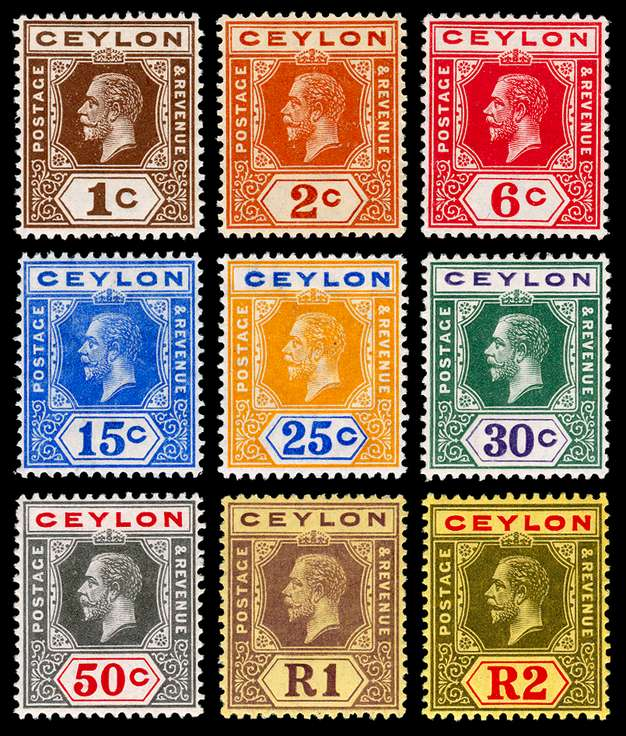
These mint British stamps for use in Ceylon exemplify the key plate approach.

== Revenues ==
Key plates were also a ubiquitous feature of revenue stamps of Burma/Myanmar, Great Britain, India, Ireland, Malta and Pakistan. These had a tablet at the bottom, and this was appropriated (overprinted to indicate the type of use), e.g. Consular Service, Contract Note, Notarial, Special Adhesive, Stocks & Shares. Malta was the only country to also issue unappropriated stamps (with the bottom tablet still blank).

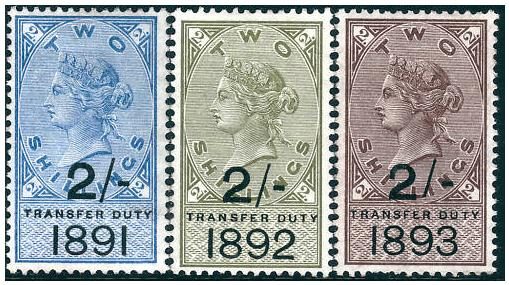
British 1891–1893 Queen Victoria revenue stamps appropriated for transfer duty

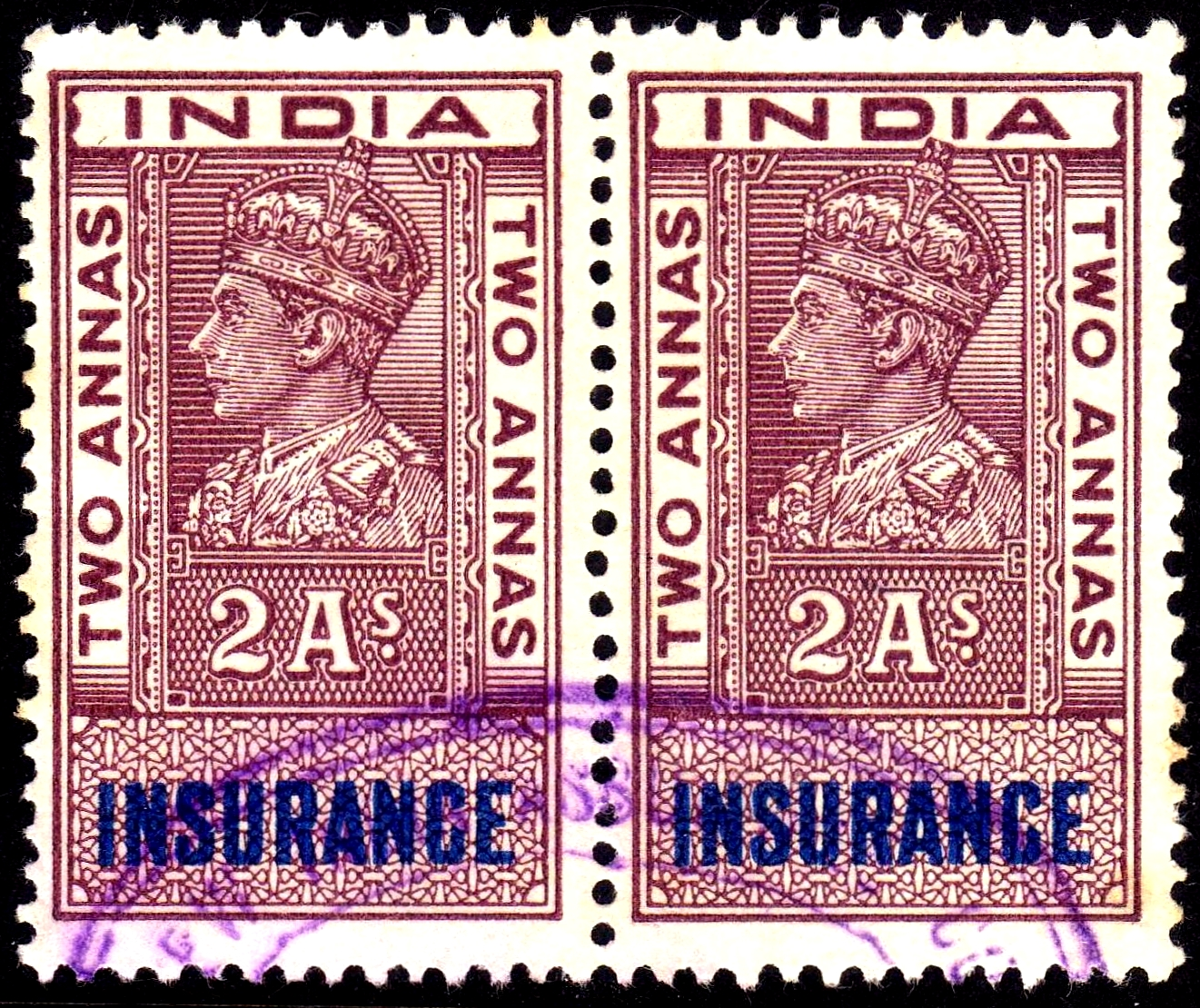
Indian 1937 King George VI revenue stamp appropriated for insurance

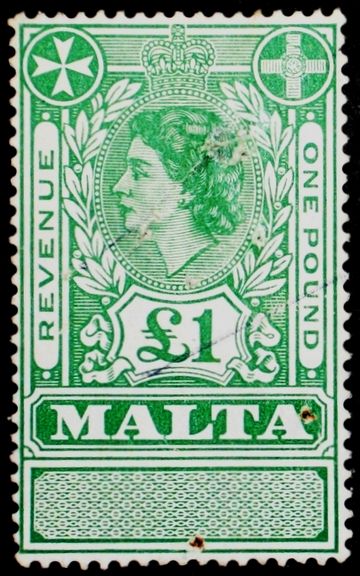
Malta, 1954 Queen Elizabeth II revenue stamp with an unappropriated tablet at the bottom

== See also ==
- Navigation and Commerce issue
- Omnibus issue
- Yacht issue
