= War savings stamps of the United States =

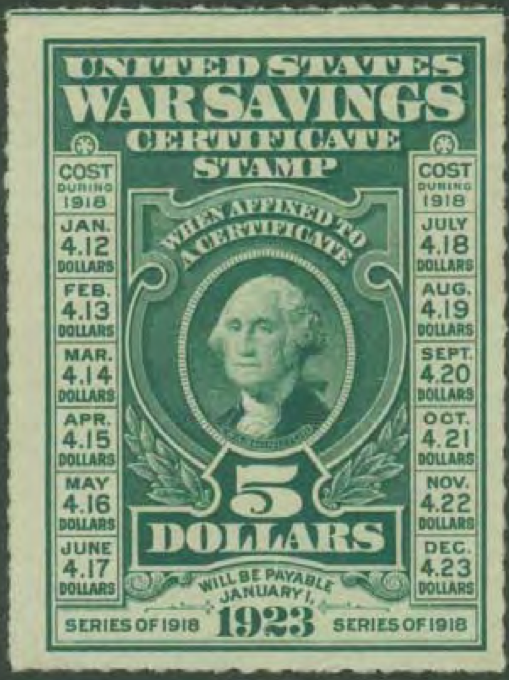
A 5-dollar War Savings Certificate Stamp, first released in late 1917.

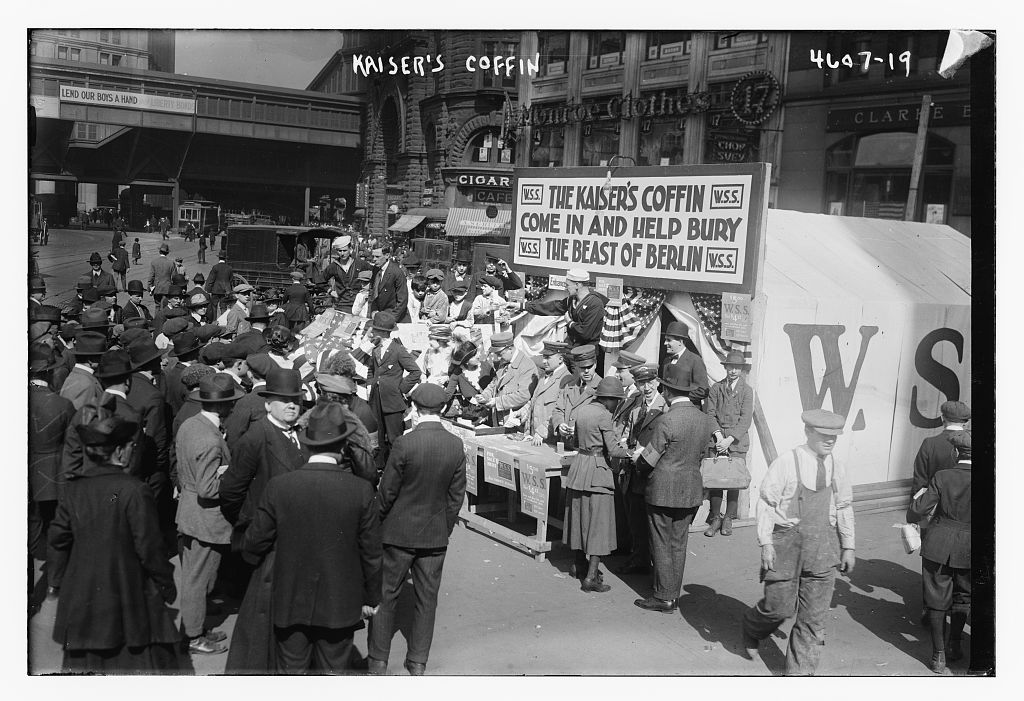
War Savings Stamps in New York City in 1918

War savings stamps were issued by the United States Treasury Department to help fund participation in World War I and World War II. Although these stamps were distinct from the postal savings stamps issued by the United States Post Office Department, the Post Office nevertheless played a major role in promoting and distributing war savings stamps. In contrast to Liberty Bonds, which were purchased primarily by financial institutions, war savings stamps were principally aimed at common citizens. During World War I, 25-cent Thrift stamps were offered to allow individuals to accumulate enough over time to purchase the standard 5-dollar War Savings Certificate stamp. When the Treasury began issuing war savings stamps during World War II, the lowest denomination was a 10-cent stamp, enabling ordinary citizens to purchase them. In many cases, collections of war savings stamps could be redeemed for Treasury Certificates or War Bonds.

== World War I era ==
The United States Treasury Department issued its first war savings stamps in late 1917 in order to help pay for the costs incurred through involvement in World War I. The estimated cost of World War I for the United States was approximately $32 billion, and by the end of the war, the United States government had issued a total of $26.4 billion in debt. Although national campaigns had aimed to sell $2 billion in war savings stamps, they ultimately accounted for about $0.93 billion, or 3.5 percent, of the total debt issued. Despite the low proportion of total debt purchased as war savings stamps, they represented real additional savings whereas other issues were at least partly monetized already. In addition, government and society leaders utilized the war savings stamps program as a vehicle to teach the importance of saving and thrift.

=== War Savings Certificate stamps ===
The primary, interest-earning stamp issued was the War Savings Certificate stamp, which was worth 5 dollars at maturity on January 1, 1923. These stamps needed to be affixed to an engraved folder called the War Savings Certificate, which carried the name of the purchaser, and could only be redeemed by that individual. Between December 3, 1917, and January 31, 1918, each stamp could be purchased at the price of $4.12. If purchased on January 2, 1918, the return on the investment would be 4 percent, compounded quarterly. The price of the stamp increased by one cent for each month after January 1918 until sales ended in December 1918. Owners of these stamps could also redeem them for cash prior to the maturity date and receive the amount paid plus one cent for every month after the original purchase. The Treasury issued a new series of War Savings Certificate stamps in subsequent years, with the same interest rate and time to maturity. The final series of War Savings Certificate stamps were issued on December 21, 1920, maturing on January 1, 1926.

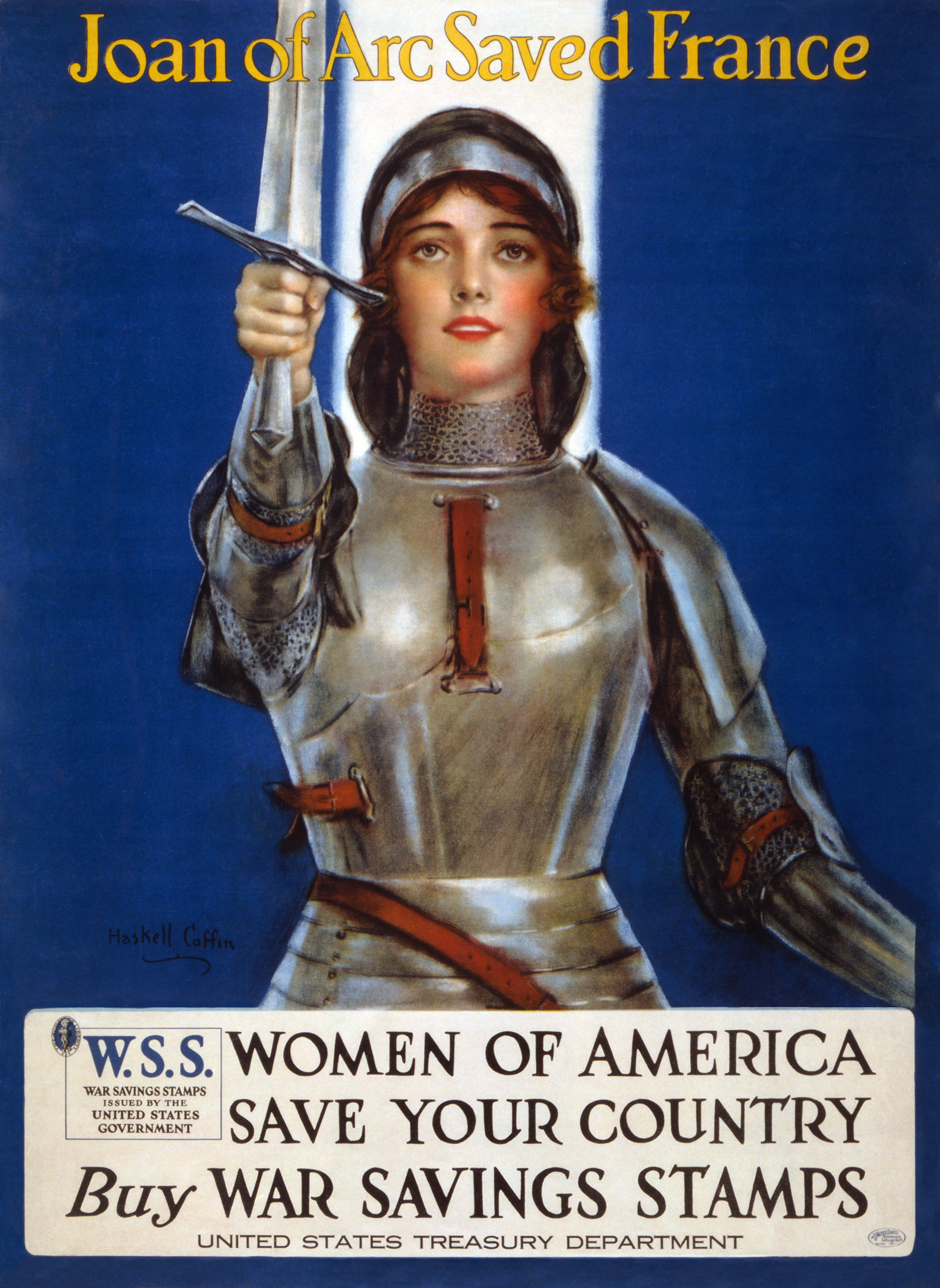
"Joan of Arc saved France--Women of America, save your country--Buy War Savings Stamps", poster for World War I war savings stamps, 1918.

=== Thrift stamps ===
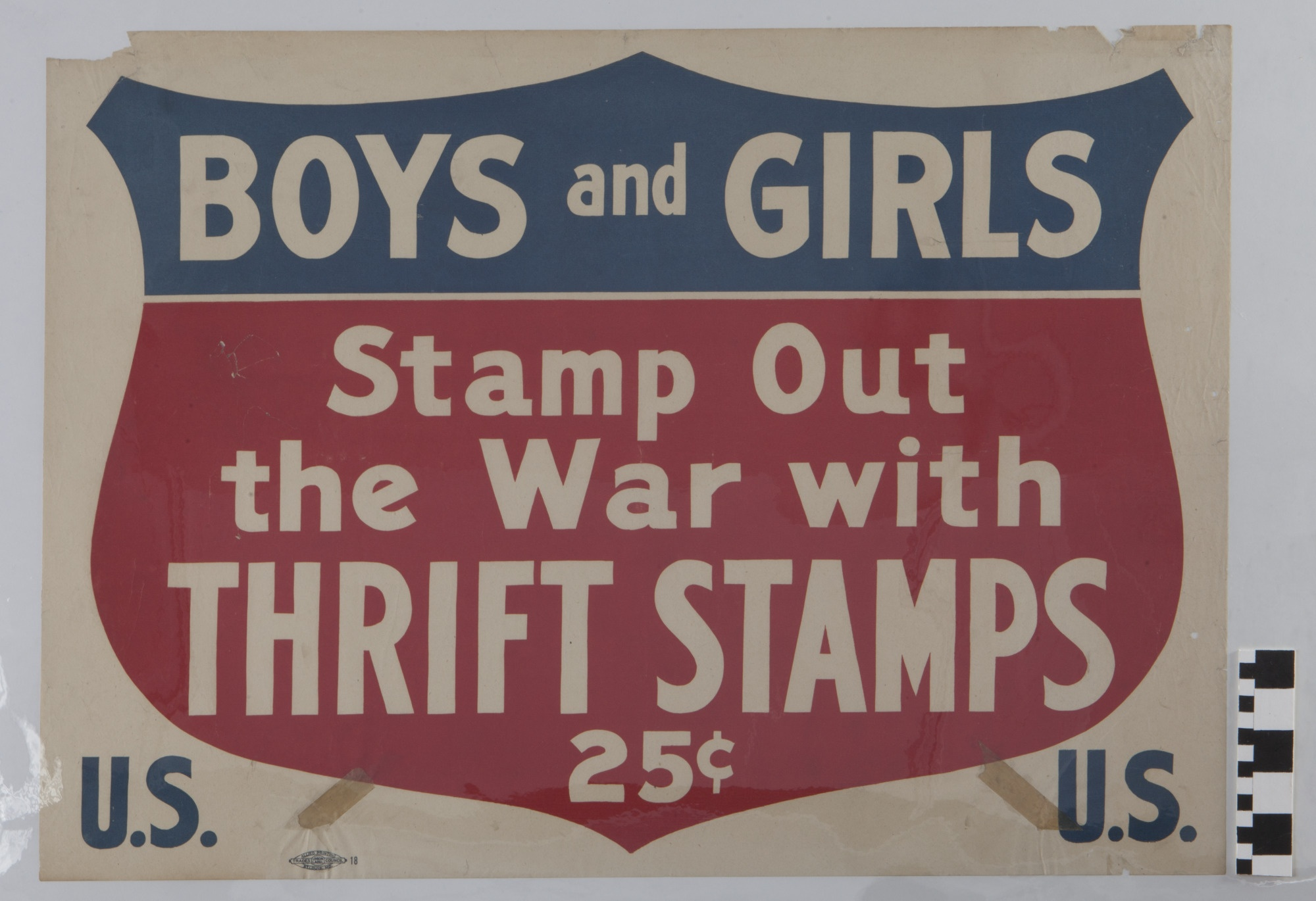
Advertisement for thrift stamps.

Along with the War Savings Certificate stamps, the Treasury also issued a set of 25-cent Thrift stamps, which bore no interest. The purpose of the Thrift stamps was to allow individuals without the means to purchase a War Savings Certificate stamp outright to gradually accumulate enough Thrift stamps to exchange for one later. The Treasury supplied Thrift cards, to which a total of sixteen Thrift stamps could be affixed. A full Thrift card was worth four dollars and could be combined with the appropriate number of cents to purchase a War Savings Certificate stamp.

=== Promotional efforts ===
Promotion of war savings stamps pervaded American culture during World War I. The Treasury Department established the War Savings Organization in order to coordinate marketing efforts throughout the nation. A wide variety of posters were produced to promote war savings stamps, often invoking a sense of patriotic duty to purchase them to support war efforts. President Woodrow Wilson called upon “every man, woman and child” to save for the war and designated June 28, 1918 as National War Savings Day. Governors, mayors, and other political leaders led by example by purchasing war savings stamps and encouraged their constituents to do the same. The Four Minute Men organization, authorized by President Wilson, also developed a series of speech outlines related to war savings stamps for its volunteers to deliver.

Support for war savings stamps also came from a variety of non-government sources. Advertisements were often donated by local newspapers in order to inform people of how war savings stamps worked and to encourage their purchase. War savings societies formed within communities across the country to promote the value of thrift and to collect funds for war savings stamps. Children were also recruited to the war saving efforts primarily through their schools. Children received school kits, which included penny and nickel savings booklets so that children could save up for a 25-cent Thrift stamp a few cents at a time.

== World War II era ==
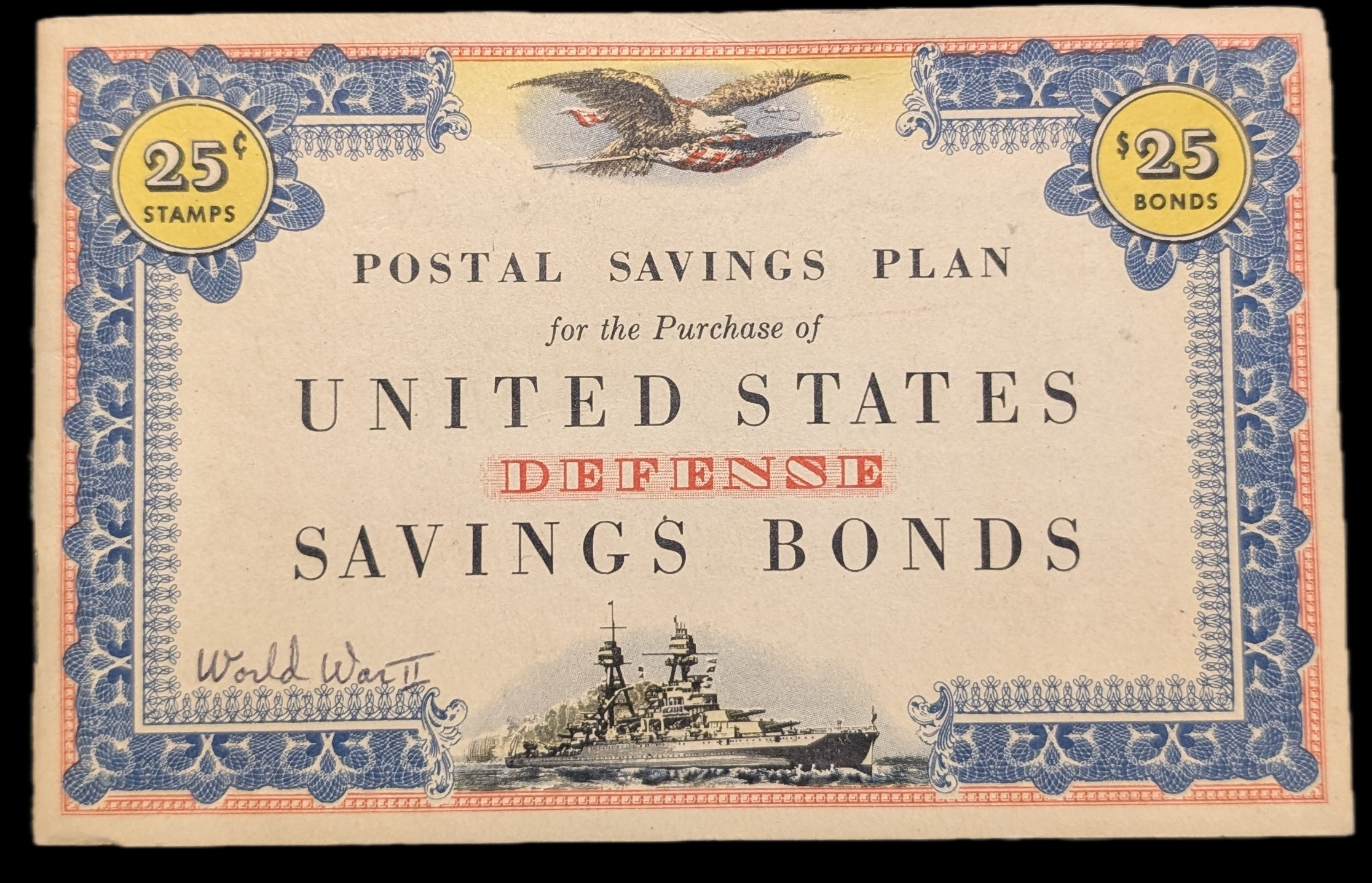
The front of a savings bond stamp book from the era

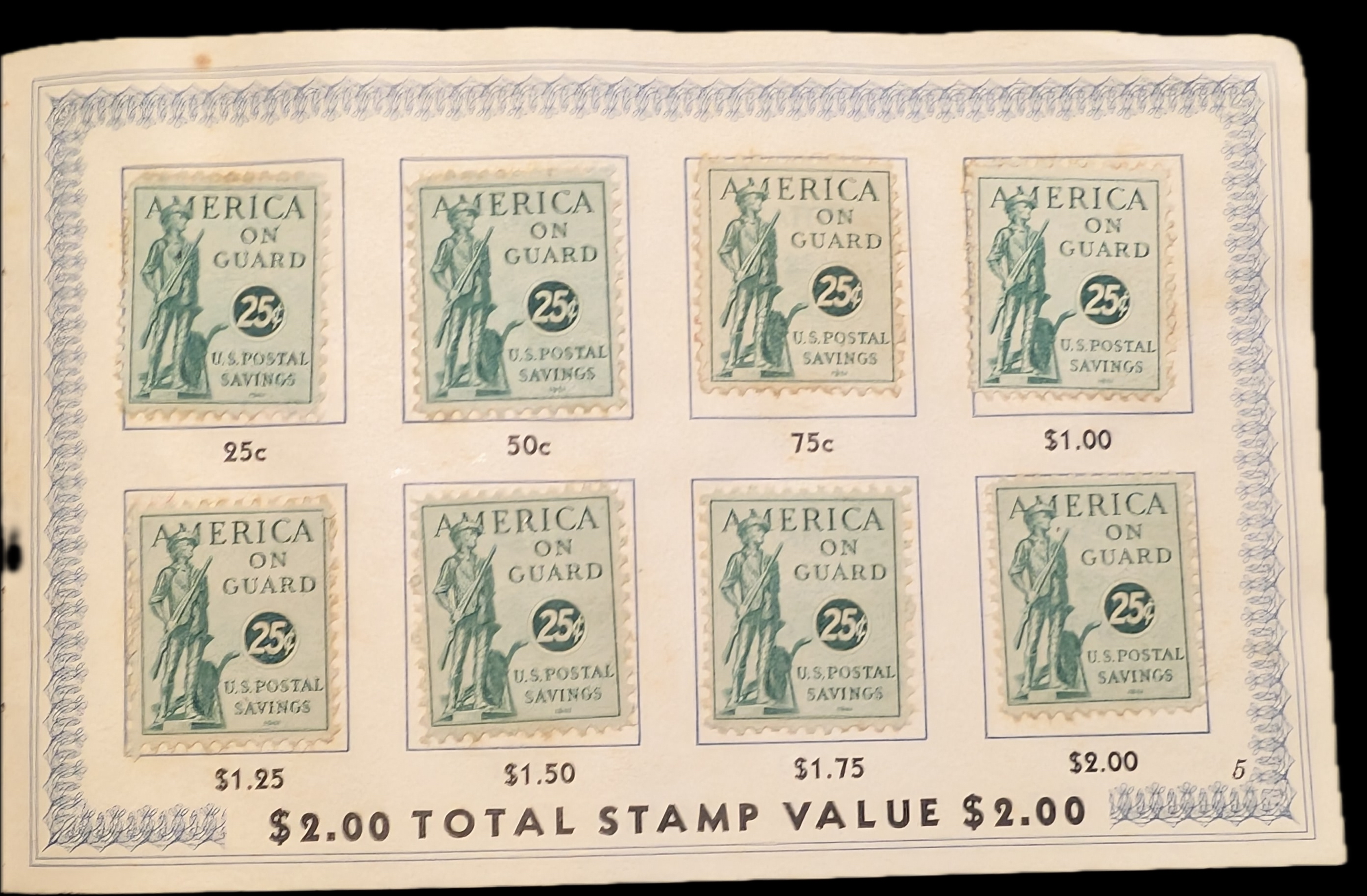
The inside of a savings bond stamp book with stamp included.

The United States Treasury Department began to issue a series of war savings stamps in late 1942. Unlike the War Savings Certificate stamps from World War I, these war savings stamps earned no interest. Instead, their sole purpose was to facilitate saving toward the purchase of Series E war bonds.

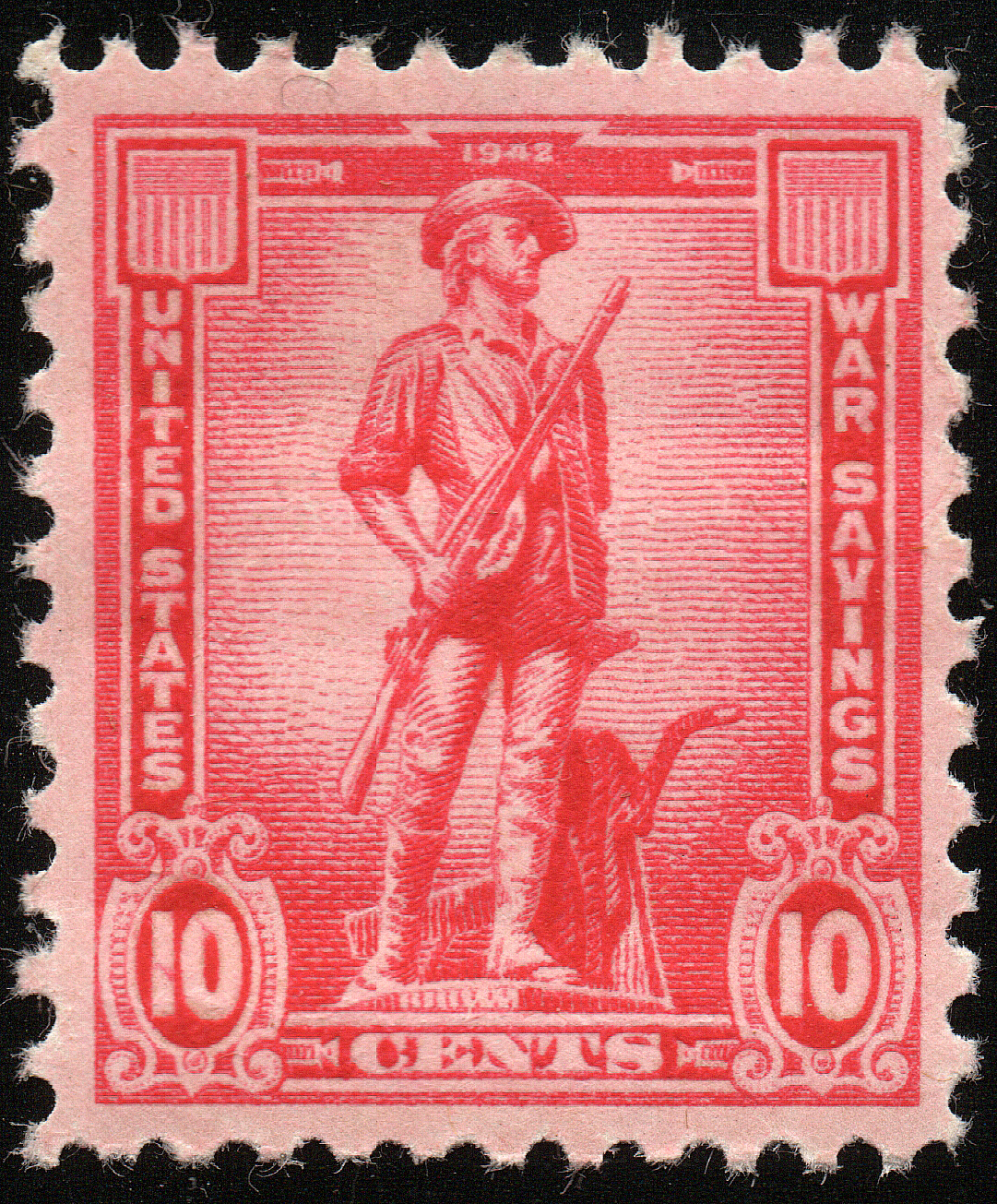
10¢ (lowest denomination) "Minuteman" US War Savings Stamp (rose red) 1942

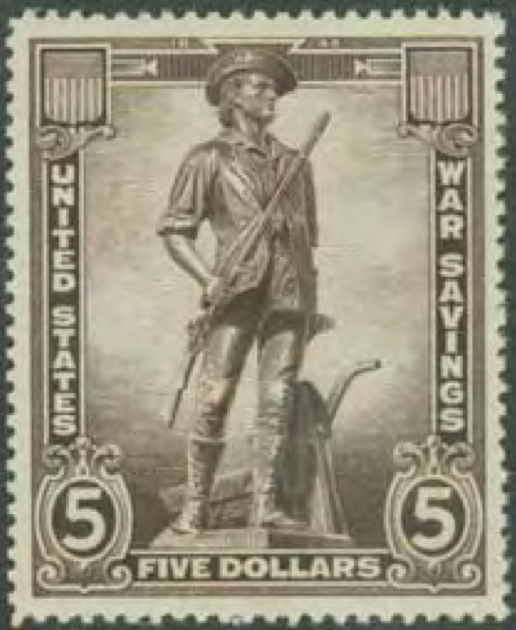
$5 (highest denomination) "Minuteman" War Savings Stamp (sepia) 1942

=== Minuteman stamps ===
The war savings stamps introduced during World War II were released in five different denominations – 10 cents, 25 cents, 50 cents, one dollar, and five dollars, all featuring a Minuteman statue. These stamps were purchased at face value and earned no interest. Individuals accumulated their war savings stamps in various collection booklets provided with the purchase of a stamp. Filled collection booklets could later be used to purchase Series E war bonds. For example, a full 25-cent booklet contained 75 stamps and was worth $18.75, which was the initial price of a $25 war bond. Thus, a full 25-cent booklet would be exchanged for a $25 war bond with a time to maturity of ten years.

=== Promotional efforts ===
The promotion of war savings stamps during World War II was closely tied with the promotion of the Series E war bonds. In order to mobilize the home front to support the war efforts ideologically and financially, the Treasury Department's primary message revolved around patriotism. With support from the advertising industry, which donated $250 million worth of advertising during the first three years of the campaign, war bonds and stamps permeated everyday life. Advertisements appeared as posters on trolley cars, songs on the radio, and movies featuring Hollywood stars like Frank Sinatra and Bob Hope. Utilizing the concept of market segmentation, numerous campaigns were developed to target different populations such as women, immigrants, and children. The Treasury developed classroom material that highlighted the positive impact of war savings stamps while enforcing math skills.

== Similar schemes ==
During World War II, the Mennonite Central Committee offered red Civilian Public Service stamps and blue War Sufferers' Relief stamps for ten cents each to help fund peaceful programs and offer an alternative for children from families who could not conscientiously fund the Red Cross. The Brethren in Christ had a similar program for their members.

== See also ==
- Liberty bond
- Series E bond
