= Roger Booth (philatelist) =

British philatelist

Roger G. Booth is a British philatelist who is a Fellow of the Royal Philatelic Society London and an expert on the revenue stamps of the United Kingdom and Ireland.

Booth has written important stamp catalogues of those areas and his papers relating to his researches are now in the British Library Philatelic Collections as the Booth Papers.

== Selected publications ==
- Judicial Stamps of Great Britain and Pre-1922 Ireland, 1997. (With Clive Akerman).
