= Bangladesh Institute of Philatelic Studies =

Research institute in Bangladesh

The Bangladesh Institute of Philatelic Studies is a research institution in Bangladesh that researches postage stamps of Bangladesh.

== History ==
The Bangladesh Institute of Philatelic Studies was founded in 1988. Siddique Mahmudar Rahman was the first director of the institute. The institute in 2004 published the first interactive database of Bangladesh stamps on a compact disk.

== Publications ==
- Rahman, Siddique Mahmudur (1988). Bangladesh stamps and postal history. Bangladesh Institute of Philatelic Studies.
- Rahman, Siddique Mahmudur (1995). Bangladesh stamps, 1971-1994. Bangladesh Institute of Philatelic Studies.
- Khan, Ishtiaque Ahmed (1996). The meter franking cancellations of Bangladesh. Bangladesh Institute of Philatelic Studies.
