= Revenue stamps of British Guiana =

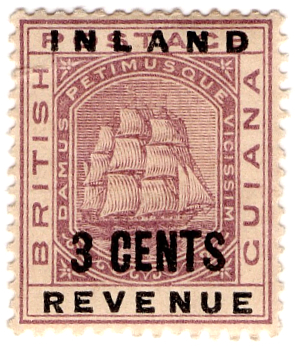
The 3c stamp from the 1888 Inland Revenue issue, depicting the colonial badge

Revenue stamps of British Guiana refer to the various revenue or fiscal stamps, whether adhesive or directly embossed, which were issued by British Guiana prior to the colony's independence as Guyana in 1966. Between the 1860s and 1890s, the colony issued Inland Revenue and Summary Jurisdiction stamps, while revenue stamps and dual-purpose postage and revenue stamps were issued during the late 19th and 20th centuries. In around the 1890s or 1900s, British Guiana possibly issued stamps for taxes on medicine and matches, but it is unclear if these were actually issued. Guyana continued to issue its own revenue stamps after independence.

== Inland Revenue or Revenue ==
British Guiana's first set of Inland Revenue stamps was issued in around 1869 and it was in use until around 1878. The stamps depicted a maripa palm tree, and they were printed by Waterlow and Sons. The stamps exist in denominations ranging from $1 to $40, and they were issued in a wide variety of perforations.

In 1888–1889, special printings of British Guiana postage stamps depicting the colonial badge (a sailing ship) were overprinted INLAND REVENUE and with face values ranging between 1c and $5. These stamps were printed by De La Rue, and some were later surcharged locally in 1889 and 1890. Despite their inscription, these stamps were also valid for postal purposes so they are regarded as postal fiscal stamps.

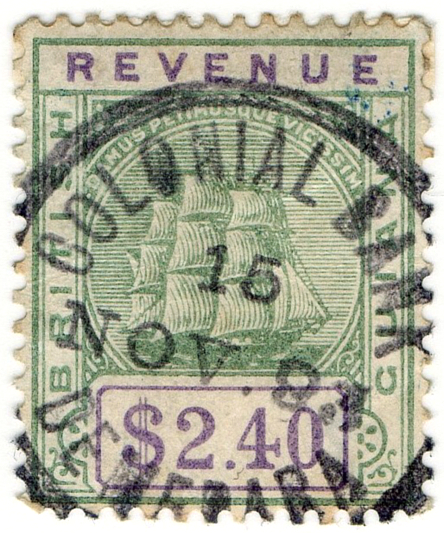
The $2.40 stamp from the 1889 issue, used at the Colonial Bank in Demerara in 1893

Between 1889 and 1911, a final set of British Guiana revenues was issued. These were also printed by De La Rue, and they depict the colonial badge and are inscribed REVENUE. Four denominations ranging between $2.40 and $12 were issued with a Crown CA watermark, while seven denominations ranging between $2.40 and $50 were issued with a Multiple Crown CA watermark. Two values with the latter watermark were also issued with overprints which made them valid for postal purposes: the $2.40 was issued with a postage and revenue overprint in 1905, and the $4.80 was overprinted as a Guyana postage stamp in 1983.

Plans to issue a set of revenue stamps depicting the monarch George VI were made in 1939, but the order was cancelled because of World War II. The ship design of 1889–1911 remained in use until the 1940s, and the country issued no more revenue-only stamps until after independence (see Revenue stamps of Guyana). Throughout the 19th and 20th centuries, British Guiana also issued dual-purpose postage and revenue stamps.

== Other types ==
=== Summary Jurisdiction ===
The first revenues to be issued by British Guiana were Summary Jurisdiction stamps. All such stamps were printed by Waterlow and they depicted a female allegorical figure representing Justice. These stamps were issued between 1866 and 1891, and they exist in a number of denominations and colours and with a wide range of different perforations. In 1887 and in the 1890s, some Summary Jurisdiction stamps were overprinted with new denominations, although it is possible that the 1887 overprints were never actually issued.

=== Medicine Duty ===
In around the 1890s or 1900s, British Guiana produced a number of Medicine Duty stamps which had designs similar to the Medicine Duty stamps of the United Kingdom. These were printed by Waterlow and they are only known unused, so it is not known if they were actually issued or not. Printer's samples of these stamps were produced by Waterlow in around the 1920s.

=== Excise on matches ===
British Guiana possibly also issued excise stamps for matches in around the 1900s. These stamps are only known from printer's samples made by Waterlow in around the 1920s, and it is not known if they were ever issued or not.

== Impressed duty stamps ==
In 1888, impressed duty stamps depicting a crown and inscribed INLAND REVENUE BRITISH GUIANA or simply BRITISH GUIANA were prepared. Some of these were issued and were in use in the 1960s, but most of them are only known as essays and it is not clear if they were issued or not.

== See also ==
- Revenue stamps of Guyana
- Postage stamps and postal history of British Guiana
