= Revenue stamps of Guyana =

Revenue stamps of Guyana refer to the various revenue or fiscal stamps, whether adhesive, directly embossed or otherwise, which have been issued by Guyana since its independence in 1966. Prior to independence, the country was known as British Guiana, and it had issued its own revenue stamps since the 19th century. Guyana used dual-purpose postage and revenue stamps until 1977, and it issued revenue-only stamps between 1975 and the 2000s. The country has also issued National Insurance stamps, labels for airport departure tax and excise stamps for cigarettes and alcohol.

== Revenue ==
On 1 November 1975, Guyana issued a series of revenue stamps by overprinting a number of postage stamps which had been issued between 1971 and 1973 with the text REVENUE ONLY. The overprint was applied to stamps with denominations ranging from 2c to $5, all of which depicted flowers. Despite the overprint, the stamps were also valid for postal use until 30 June 1976, and they are therefore regarded as postal fiscal stamps. Some of these stamps were later additionally overprinted for use as postage or official stamps.

Also in 1975, revenue stamps with denominations of $10, $20 and $50 which depicted a map of the country were printed by Bradbury Wilkinson and Company, and they are believed to have been issued in Guyana sometime in 1975. Some time later further revenue stamps with this design were printed by Harrison and Sons, this time with denominations ranging from 2c to $50. Some of the Harrison stamps exist postally used, and some were overprinted for postal use in the 1980s.

In the 1980s, some Guyanese postage stamps which depicted butterflies were issued with revenue overprints, and in around 1990 one of the map stamps printed by Harrison was issued with a $300 surcharge.

A new design of revenue stamps which depicted the country's coat of arms was issued in around 2000. This was printed by BDT International Security Printing and it has face values ranging from $1 to $1000. A modified version of this design was later issued in self-adhesive format, and it had the same denominations and was also printed by BDT.

Apart from revenue-only issues, Guyana also issued dual-purpose postage and revenue stamps. Postage stamps ceased to be valid for fiscal use on 1 January 1977.

== Other types ==
=== National Insurance ===
Guyana ordered a set of six National Insurance stamps from the printer Harrison and Sons in 1969. No examples of these stamps have been recorded.

=== Airport tax ===
The Guyana Revenue Authority issues adhesive labels as receipts for the payment of the travel or departure tax upon leaving the country. As of 2020, the price of such a label at Cheddi Jagan International Airport is $4000, consisting of a travel tax of $2500 and an airport security fee of $1500.

=== Excise on cigarettes and alcohol ===
Since 16 November 2017, the Guyana Revenue Authority has issued self-adhesive excise stamps for cigarettes and alcohol. These are affixed to cigarette packets and alcohol bottles to show that the appropriate tax has been paid, and they were introduced as an anti-smuggling measure. The stamps are printed by the Canadian Bank Note Company and they have a number of security features aimed at preventing forgery.

== Impressed duty stamps ==
Guyana used impressed duty stamps depicting the coat of arms and inscribed INLAND REVENUE GUYANA in the 1960s.

== See also ==
- Revenue stamps of British Guiana
- Postage stamps and postal history of Guyana
