= Fiscal cancel =

Stamp cancellation indicating usage for tax purposes

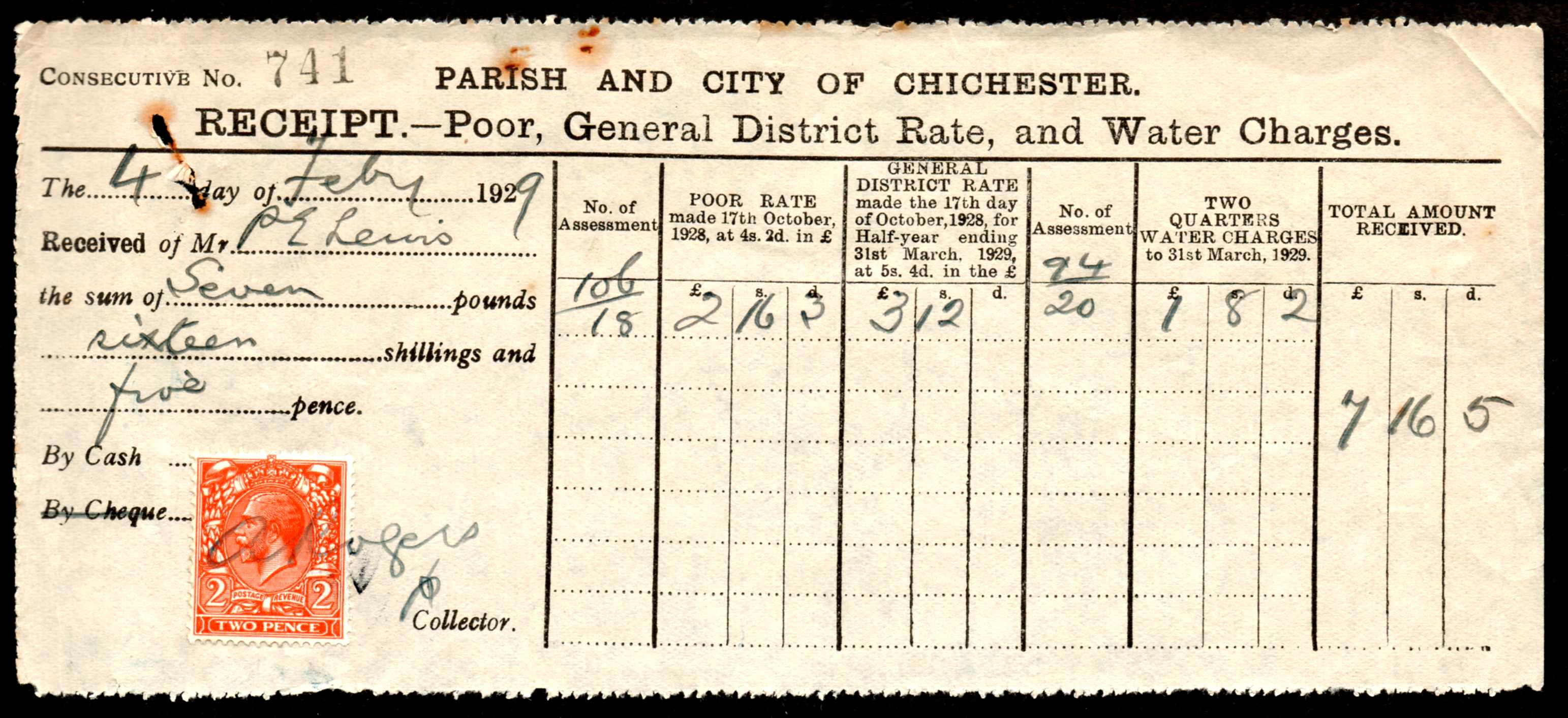
A 1929 receipt showing a British postage and revenue stamp with a fiscal cancel.

In philately a fiscal cancel – symbol – is a cancellation on a stamp that indicates that the stamp has been used for fiscal (taxation) purposes.

The stamp may either be a revenue stamp, intended purely for fiscal use, or it may be a dual-purpose stamp valid for either postal or fiscal use.

== Varieties ==
Fiscal cancels take a variety of forms:

- Pen cancels with a simple cross, initials or other markings.
- Perfin or punched hole cancels.
- Embossing.
- Damaging the surface of the stamp using a serrated or ridged roller.
- Multiple parallel cuts.
- Handstamp cancels similar to the postmark on a stamp and which may be in purple or red ink rather than the black favoured for cancels of postage stamps.
- Tearing or other physical damage to the stamp.

Examples:

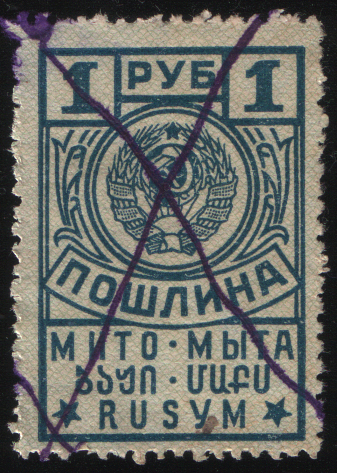
A Russian revenue stamp with a fiscal pen cancel.

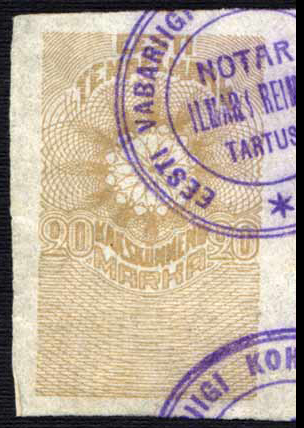
An Estonian revenue stamp with a handstamp cancel in purple.

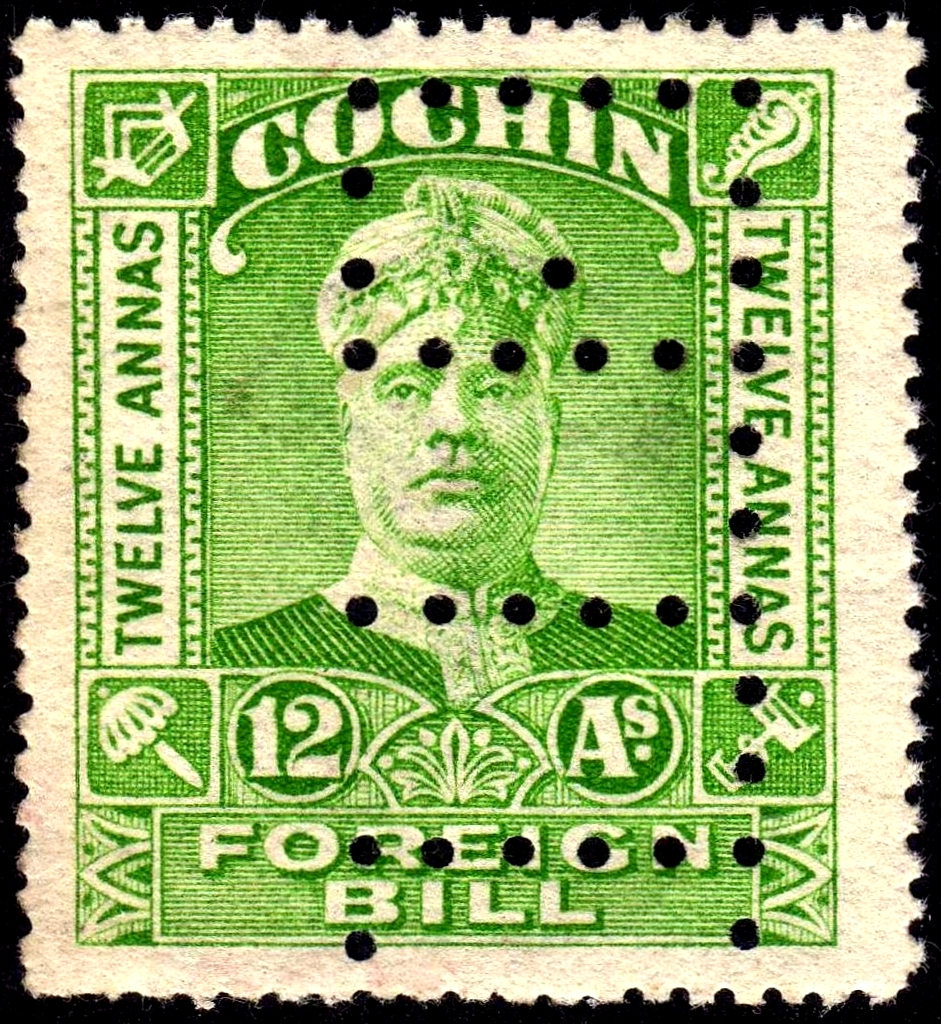
A revenue stamp from Cochin cancelled by perforation.

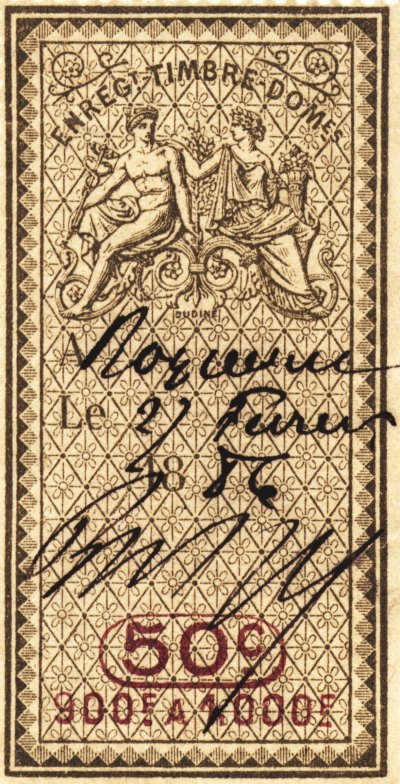
A French revenue stamp with a manuscript cancel.

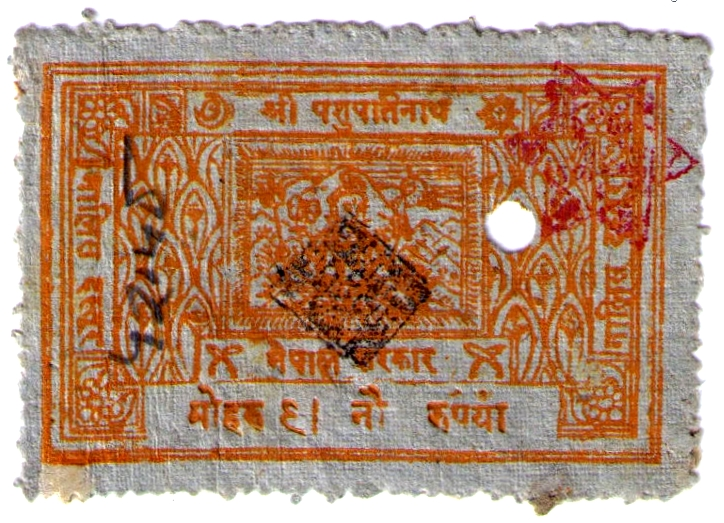
A revenue stamp of Nepal for court fees with a punched cancel as well as handstamps.

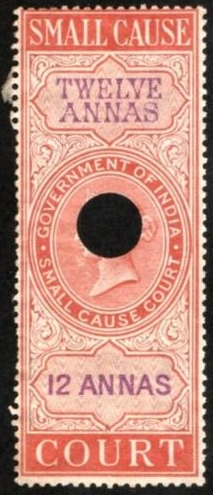
An Indian revenue stamp with a punched cancel.

== Values ==
Postage stamps valid for either fiscal or postal purposes are often worth less when fiscally used than when postally used. They are not, however, necessarily more common fiscally used than postally used.
