= Fauna of Guyana =

Animals of Guyana

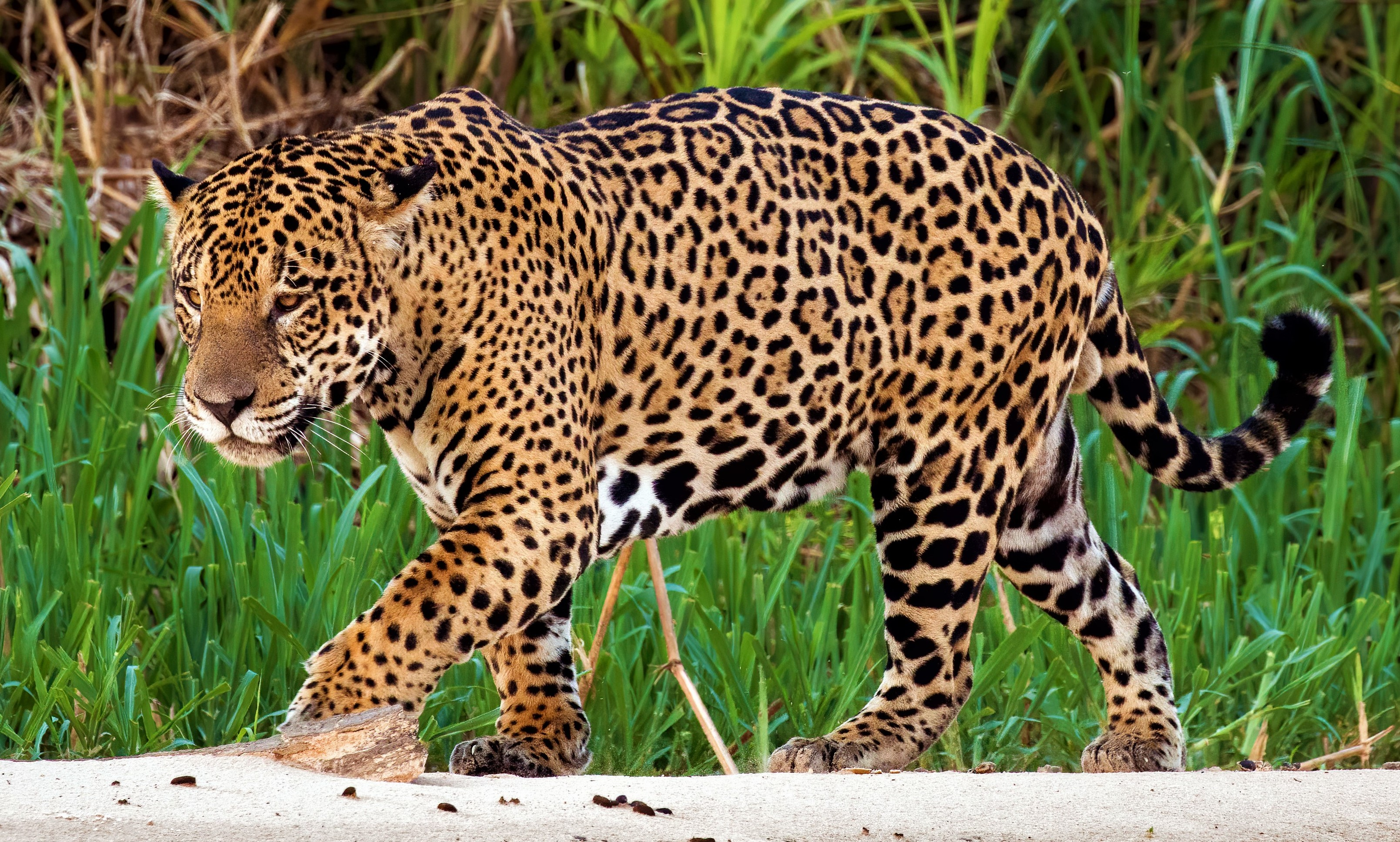
A Jaguar, the national animal of Guyana, and two are featured on Guyana's coat of arms.

The fauna of Guyana comprises all the animal species inhabiting the country of Guyana, which is part of the neotropical realm. Guyana has many endemic species and one of the highest biodiversity rates in the world as a result of the majority of the country being part of the Amazon rainforest, and as a result a large amount of the species being types of frogs or spiders. Guyana's has three distinct main biomes are tropical rainforests, wetlands, and savannas, and each biome has unique fauna associated.

There are 47,677 unique species classified as part of Guyana, of which 17,291 (36.27%) are classified as an endangered species. As part of conservation efforts, parts of Guyana have been designated as national parks.

== Rainforest fauna ==
Being part of the Amazon rainforest, a lot of Guyana's rainforest fauna is not exclusively native. Its high biodiversity also means that a significant variety of creatures exist within the country.

=== Mammals ===
Guyana's rainforests have a wide variety of mammals, the most notable being the Jaguar as it is featured on the coat of arms. Most mammals in Guyana are shared with other countries via the Amazon rainforest. Examples of shared mammals include the three-toed sloth and the capuchin monkey, the latter of which has protection in the form of the Iwokrama Forest Reserve.

=== Reptiles and amphibians ===
Amphibians and reptiles make up another significant portion of the habitat. Snakes are a common reptile in the tall grass of the rainforest. As such, notable examples include the heaviest snake in the world, the green anaconda, the rainbow boa, and the bushmaster.

=== Birds ===
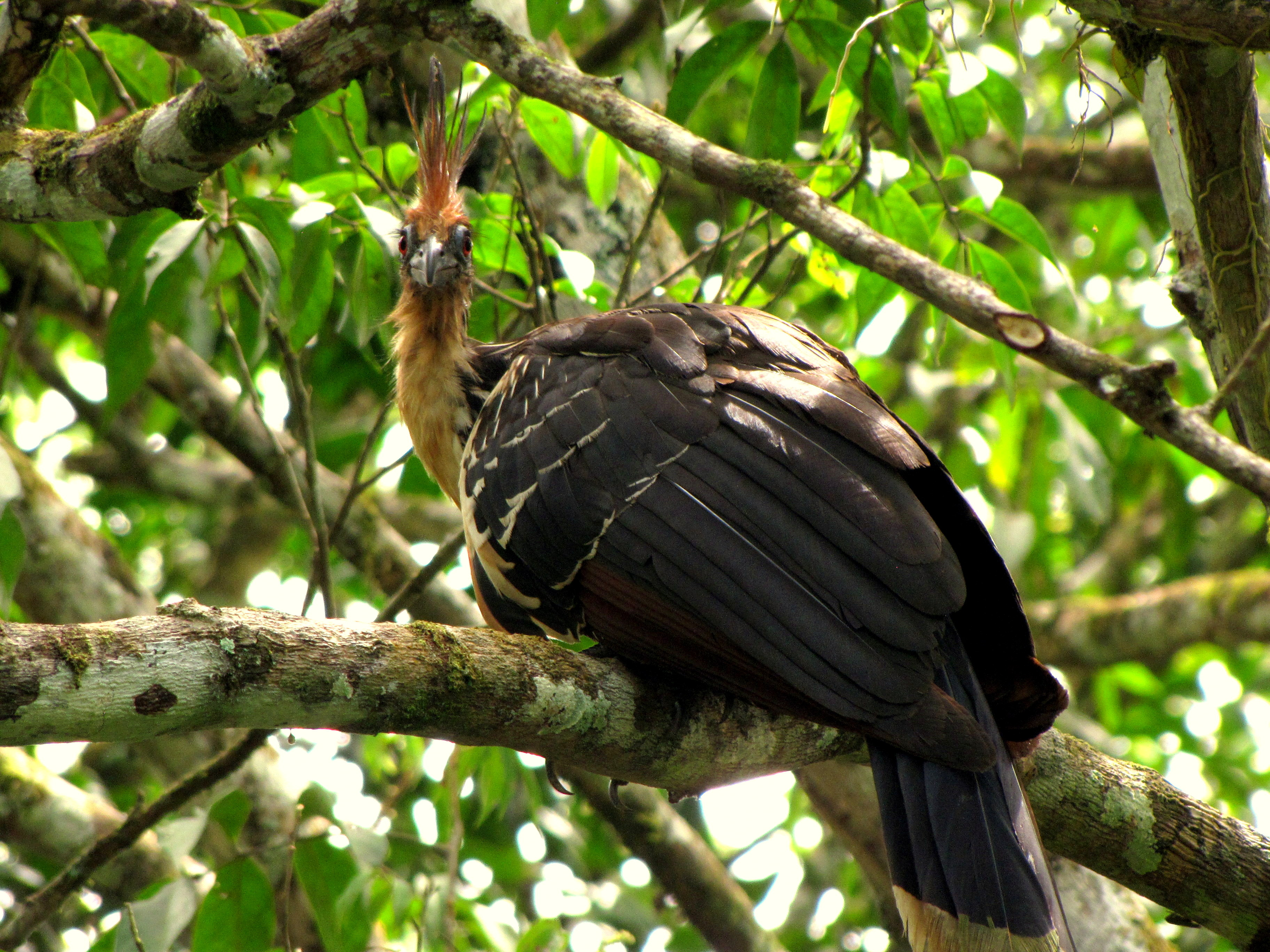
The Hoatzin is the national bird of Guyana. It is additionally a folivore.

Guyana is additionally home to many species of birds. The national bird is the Hoatzin, found in the rainforest along the Berbice River. Other common native birds include the horned screamer and the great tinamou.

== Conservation ==
The largest threats to conservation of species in Guyana is pollution and habitat destruction arising from increased industrialisation, and poaching. An additional threat is invasive species which disrupt the local ecosystem. To help with conservation, the Protected Areas Commission was formed, which designates certain parts of the country as national parks and protected areas, preventing development.

== Articles by Region ==
- Fauna of Barima-Waini
- Fauna of Pomeroon-Supenaam
- Fauna of Essequibo Islands-West Demerara
- Fauna of Demerara-Mahaica
- Fauna of Mahaica-Berbice
- Fauna of East Berbice-Corentyne
- Fauna of Cuyuni-Mazaruni
- Fauna of Potaro-Siparuni
- Fauna of Upper Takutu-Upper Essequibo
- Fauna of Upper Demerara-Berbice
