= Postage stamps and postal history of Bahrain =

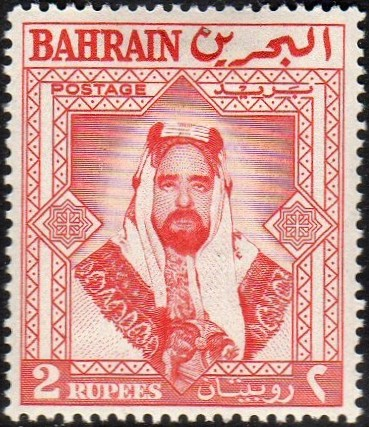
1960 Bahrain stamp depicting Sheikh Salman bin Hamad Al Khalifa

Bahrain first used the postage stamps of British India before eventually issuing its own stamps in 1960.

== Early years ==
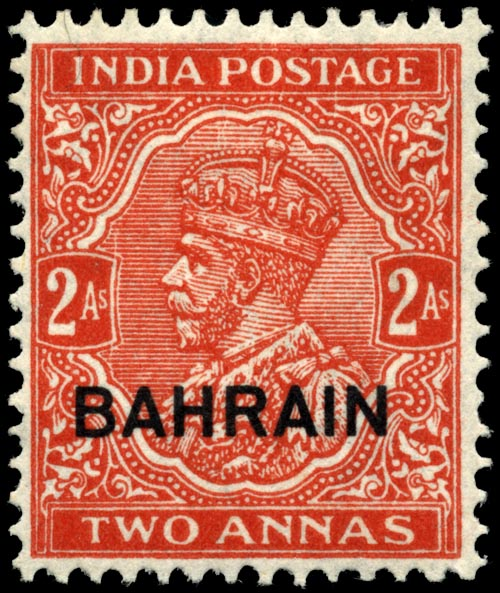
An Indian stamp of 1935, depicting George V and overprinted BAHRAIN

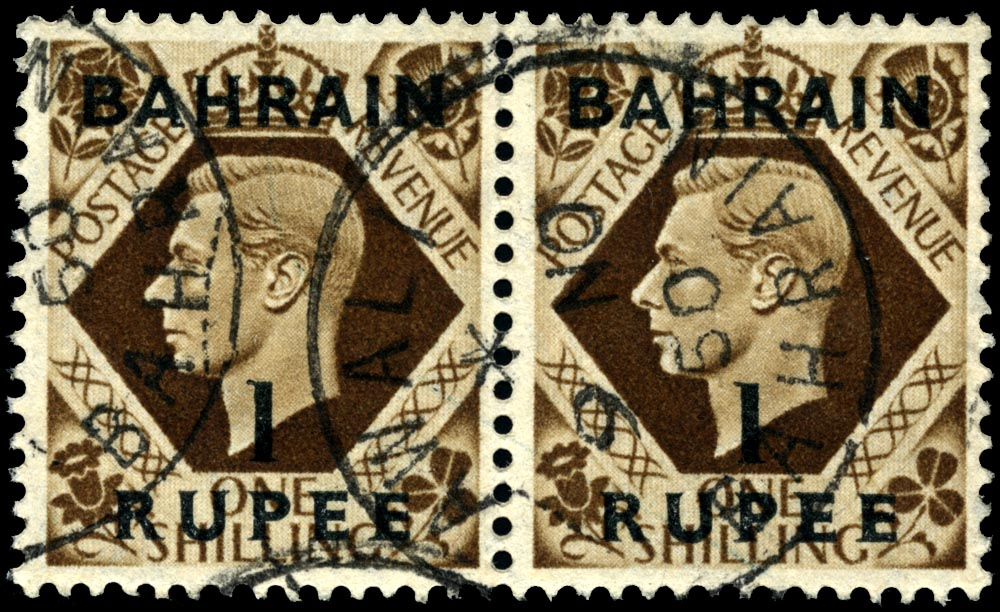
A pair of used British George VI stamps overprinted for use in Bahrain

The first post office in Bahrain opened on 1 August 1884 in the capital, Manama. This was a sub-office of the Indian Post Office at Bushire in Iran, both of which were part of the Bombay Postal Circle. This remained the only post office until 1946. Stamps of British India were used in Bahrain until 1933 and used examples may be identified from the cancellations which are illustrated in specialised catalogues.

== 1933 to 1947 ==
British India stamps overprinted BAHRAIN were used from 1933 to 1947 depicting George V (1933) and then George VI from 1938. Un-overprinted Victory stamps of India were also on sale in Bahrain during January 1946 and a 16 anna stamp booklet was issued in 1934.

== 1948 to 1960 ==
From 1 April 1948, postal administration was handled by the British Postal Agencies in Eastern Arabia. British issues overprinted BAHRAIN and surcharged in annas or rupees were in use from 1948 to 1960. Numerous varieties of overprint exist which are listed in specialist catalogues and eagerly sought after by philatelists.

== First Bahraini stamps ==
A number of local stamps were issued between 1953 and 1961 which, whilst intended only for domestic mail, are known used on international mail. These stamps all depicted Sheikh Salman bin Hamad Al Khalifa and are similar in design to the later 1960 series.

The first stamps specifically designed for both domestic and international mail were a definitive set issued on 1 July 1960, which featured Sheikh Salman bin Hamad Al Khalifa with Arabic text at the top. In 1964, a new definitive set was issued depicting Sheikh Isa bin Salman Al Khalifa.

The Bahrain Post Office fully took over postal services from Britain on 1 January 1966 when a further definitive set was issued.

== War Tax issues ==
Beginning during the Arab-Israeli War of October 1973, Bahrain required that all letters bear evidence of the payment of a 5 fils tax that raised funds for Palestinian refugees. At first regular 5 fils stamps were added at the post office and handstamped 'War Effort' in Arabic. On 21 October 1973, similarly inscribed stamps, printed with light blue ink, were issued. On 1 December 1973, this first issue was replaced by one with a more stylized script, also in light blue. In 1988, this second stamp was issued with slightly larger perforations. While more appropriately known as postal tax stamps, major catalogues have classified them as war tax stamps.

== Recent stamp issues ==
Since obtaining postal independence, the Bahrain Post Office has pursued a conservative policy issuing four or five sets of stamps each year with an occasional new definitive series. The stamps have generally featured subjects of local or regional interest.

== Cinderella stamps ==
A number of cinderella and bogus stamps have been issued over the years including official traffic safety labels available free from Bahraini post offices in 1981 and a bogus Bahrain Camel Post series between 1986 and 1990. The Camel Post series was based on the famous desert postman stamps of Sudan and sold in aid of a home for disabled children.

== See also ==
- Bahrain Post
- Revenue stamps of Bahrain
