= Revenue stamps of Bahrain =

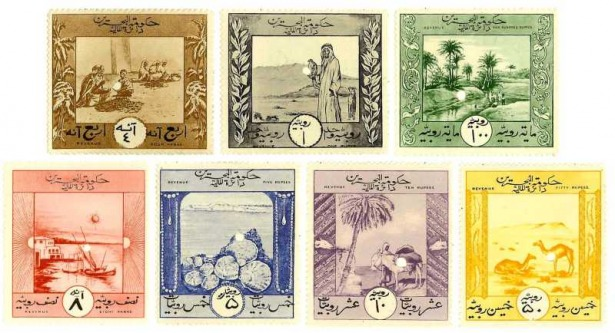
The complete set of Bahrain's first revenue issue, each value with a punched hole indicating that they are unissued samples.

The first revenue stamps of Bahrain were issued in 1924. Before then Indian revenue stamps were used on documents. Revenue stamps have been used for Land Registry documents, drivers permits and the Dhow Registry.

== First series (1924-1950) ==
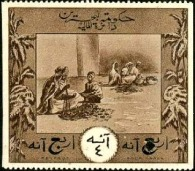
The 4 annas value from the 1924 issue.

The first series consisted of seven values from 4 Annas to 100 Rupees and were printed by Waterlow & Sons Ltd in Great Britain. A number of varieties exist including perforate and imperforate stamps, colour trials and bisects. These are very rare genuinely used and most copies that exist are specimens. In about 1950, the 1R value was surcharged 2 RUPEES, and this is the rarest stamp of this series.

== Later issues (1953- ) ==
The next revenue issue after the first series was issued in 1953. These stamps were similar to contemporary postage stamps but with the word REVENUE added in the design. Four years later, in 1957, the low values of this set were reissued in the new currency (paisa) and in new colours. In 1961 a set of two values was issued, similar to previous designs but with the coat of arms of Bahrain instead of the Sheikh's portrait. This was locally printed, unlike the previous two issues which were printed by De La Rue. In 1961 another set was also issued, and this was reissued in fils and dinars in 1966. A set in a new design was issued between 1971 and 1988, with the portrait of the Sheikh and the coat of arms. Other sets were issued in 1992 and 2014.

== Stamped papers ==
A variety of revenue stamped papers have been available since 1930.

== Other issues ==
The 100f and 500f values from the 1966 and 1971 revenue issues also exist with a handstamp in Arabic reading War Tax, and these were used to pay the surtax applied at Bahrain Customs. In 2002, a label was issued to pay the Airport Departure Fee, and a similar one with a revised inscription was issued some time later.

== See also ==
- Postage stamps and postal history of Bahrain
