= Turner Collection of Newspaper Tax Stamps =

The Turner Collection of Newspaper Tax Stamps is a collection of newspaper tax stamps of the United Kingdom and of the 1694 6d revenue tax stamps that forms part of the British Library Philatelic Collections. It was formed by S.R. Turner and donated in 1973.
