= Bahrain Post =

Government organisation for post in Bahrain

- Company type: Agency of the Ministry of Transportation and Telecommunications
- Industry: Mail, logistics
- Founded: 1884
- Headquarters: Manama, Bahrain

Bahrain Post (Arabic: بريد البحرين, romanized: Barīd al-Baḥrayn) is the national postal service of Bahrain. Dating back to 1884, it is now part of the Ministry of Transportation and Telecommunications.

== History ==
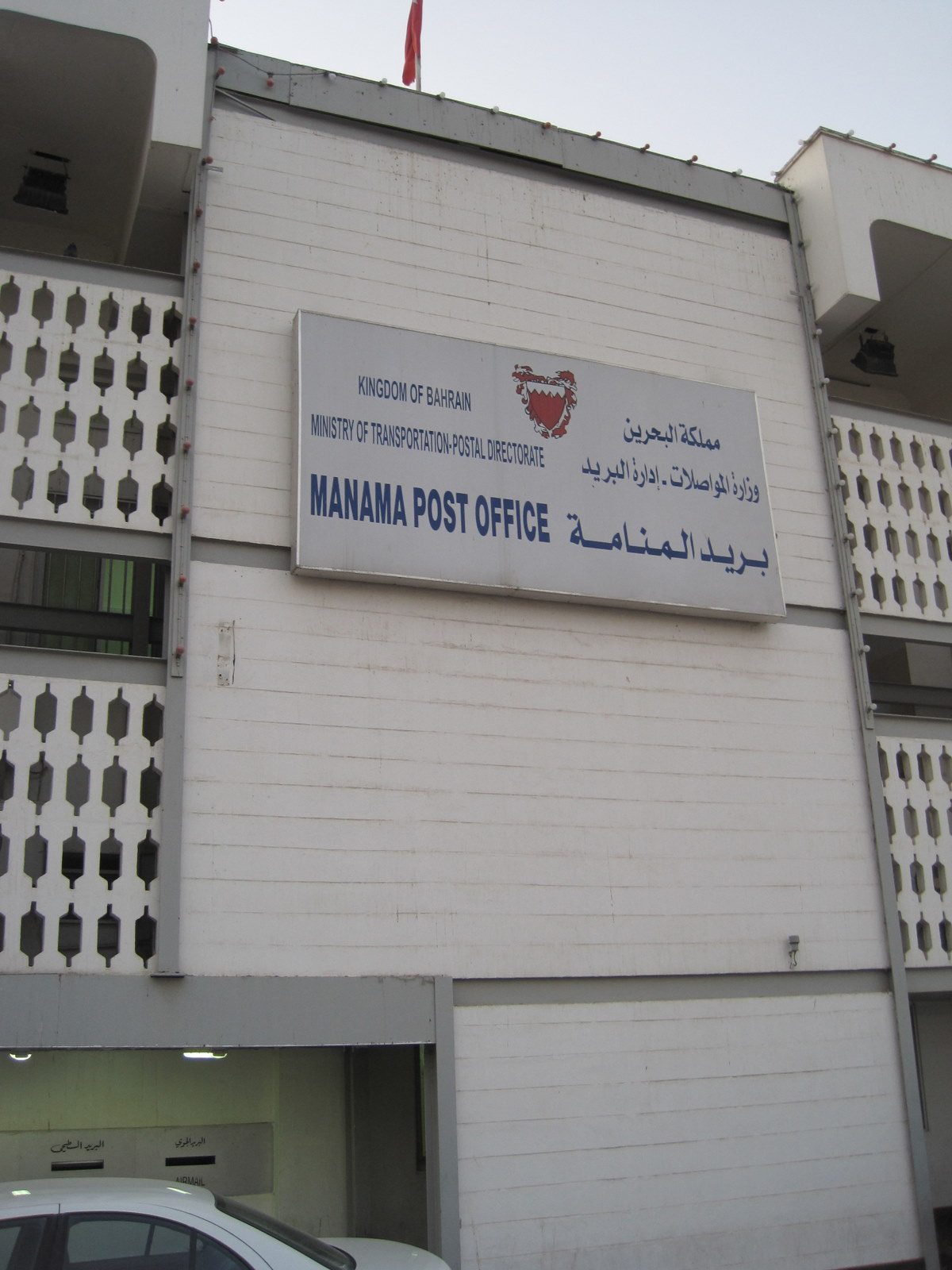
Manama post office.

The postal system in Bahrain first started in 1884 with the establishment of the Manama Post Office. The postal system expanded drastically in the twentieth century; a second post office was later built on the island of Muharraq in 1946. A third post office was set up in the expatriate-populated town of Awali, run by the Bahrain Petroleum Company.

After declaring independence in 1971, Bahrain joined the International Postal Union in December 1973. Bahrain Post later joined the Arab Postal Union in May 1986.

== See also ==
- Postage stamps and postal history of Bahrain
