= Arthur D. Ferguson =

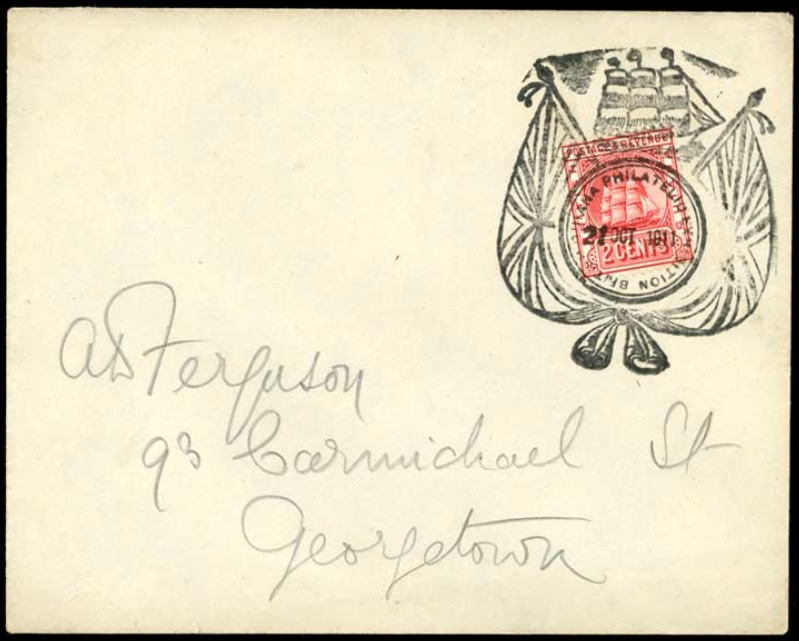
A cover addressed to Arthur Ferguson, 1911, bearing a 2c stamp with a Philatelic Exhibition commemorative cancel employed this day at the Carnegie Free Library, Georgetown.

Arthur D. Ferguson FRMS (1869 – 24 May 1928) was a banker with the British Guiana Bank and a philatelist who signed the Roll of Distinguished Philatelists in 1923. Ferguson was an expert in the stamps of British Guiana about which he wrote in The British Guiana Philatelic Journal. He was the founder (1903) and Secretary of the British Guiana Philatelic Society.

He was a non-resident Fellow of the Royal Colonial Institute, now the Royal Commonwealth Society, elected 1909.
