= Postal tax stamp =

A postal tax stamp refers to a stamp which raises revenue for charity or war related projects. Postal tax stamps are similar to semi-postals, except their use is mandatory instead of voluntary. They are used to show payment of a compulsory tax on mailing letters and parcels. The taxes often go to a charitable institution or fund.

The postal tax stamp originated in Spain and Portugal. Many Balkan nations and some Latin American nations have been the most prolific issuers of postal tax stamps. There are no postal tax stamps in the United States.

== See also ==
- Postal fiscal stamp - A revenue stamp authorised for postal use.
- War tax stamp - similar to a postal tax stamp, albeit to fund a war.
