= Postage stamps and postal history of British Guiana =

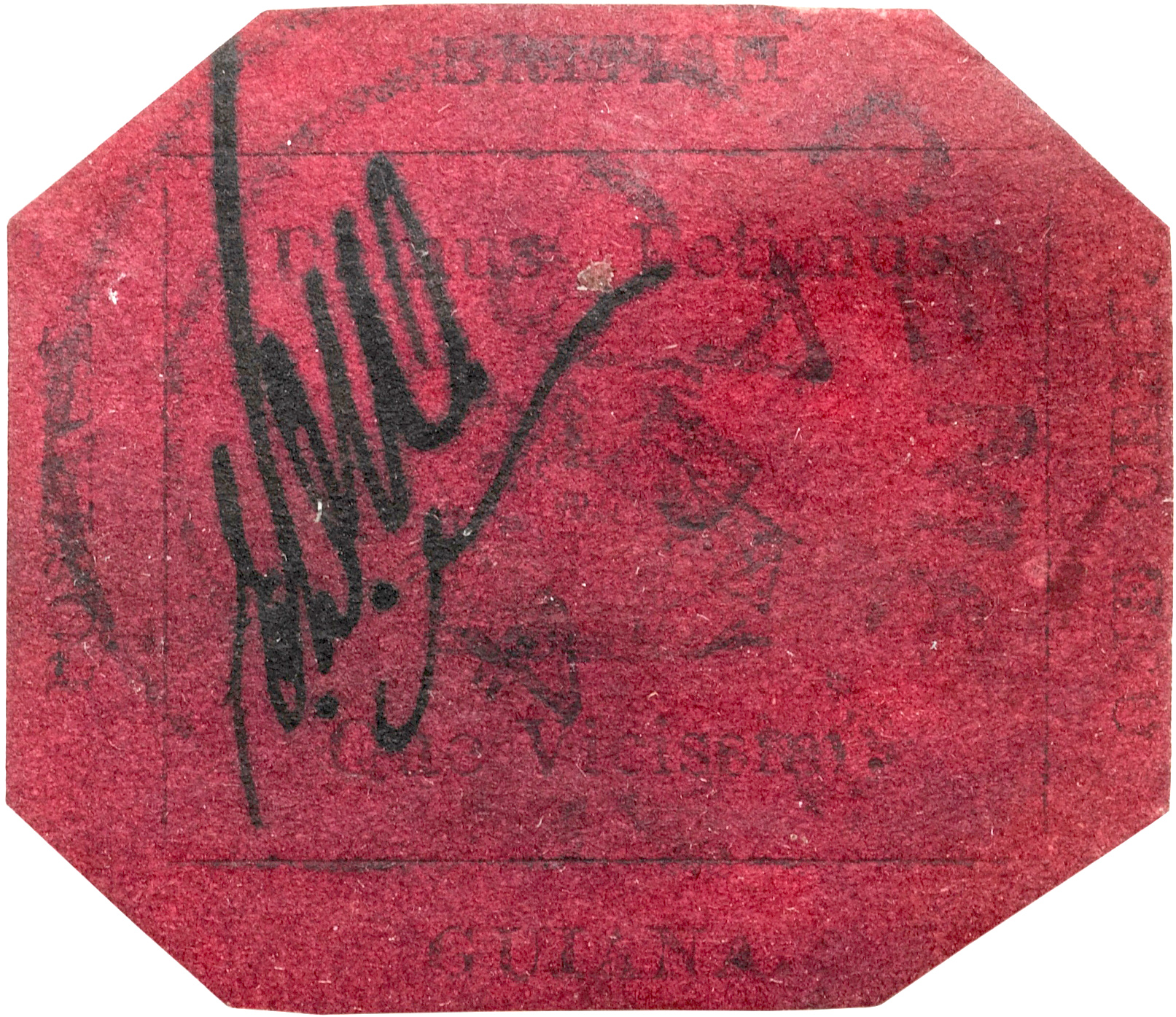
An 1856 British Guiana 1c magenta, regarded as the world's rarest stamp

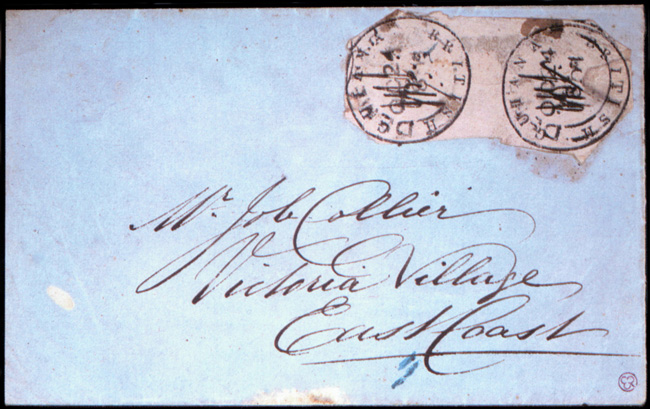
An 1851 British Guiana 2 cents pink "Cottonreel" pair on cover. Provenance: Ferrary, King George V.

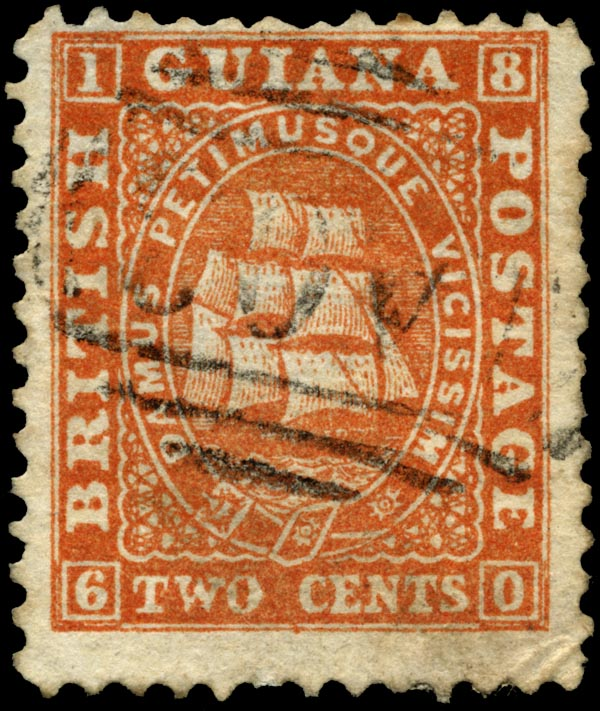
A 2 cent stamp of British Guiana, issued in 1860

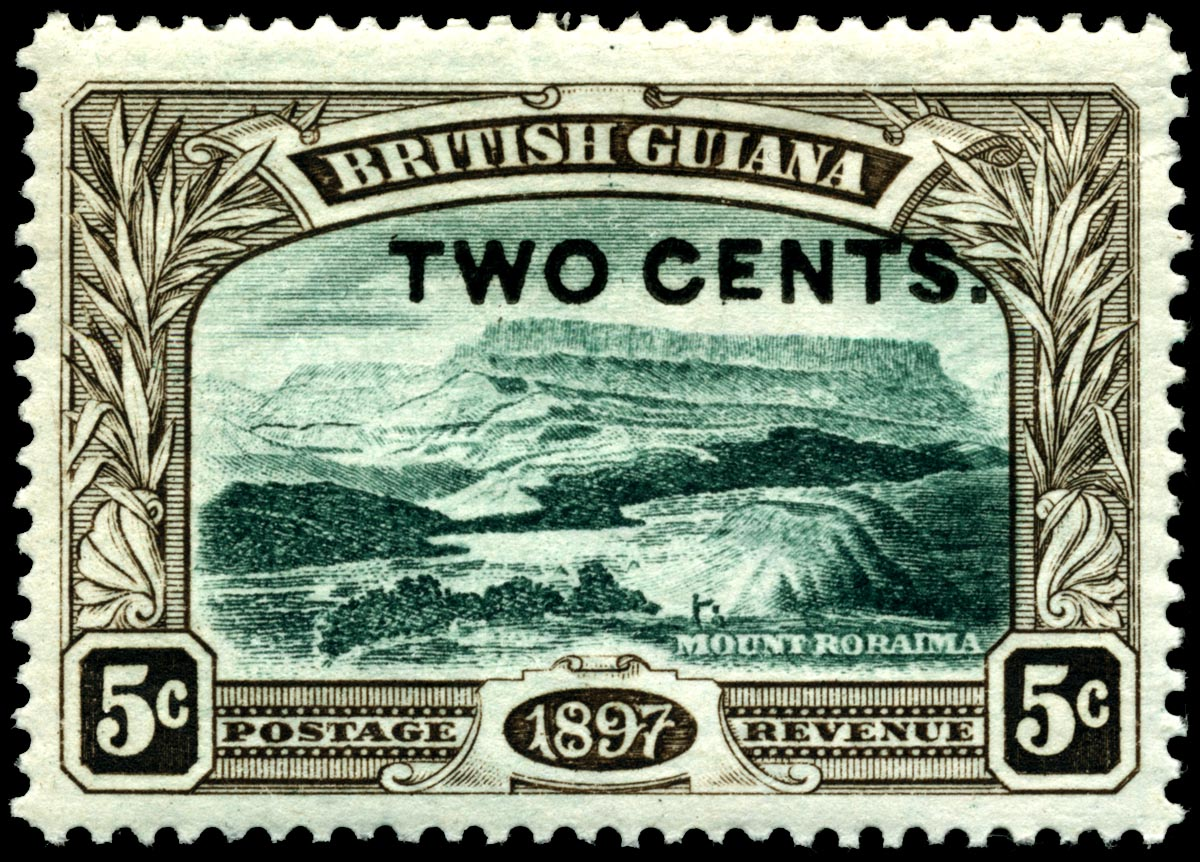
An overprinted Mount Roraima commemorative stamp of 1898

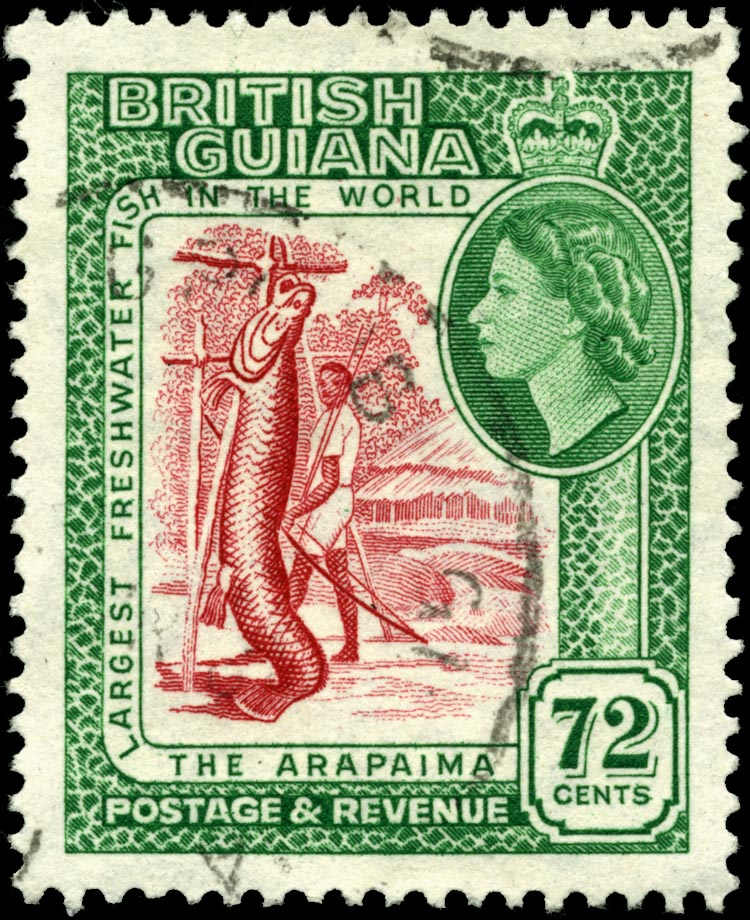
The 1954 72 cent stamp billed the Arapaima as the largest freshwater fish in the world.

A privately run packet service for mail existed in British Guiana in 1796, and continued for a number of years. Postage stamps of Britain were used in those days at Georgetown (Demerara) and Berbice. The first adhesive stamps produced by British Guiana were issued in 1850.

British Guiana is famous among philatelists for its early postage stamps, some of them considered to be among the rarest, most expensive stamps in the world. These include the unique British Guiana 1c magenta from 1856, which sold in 1980 for close to $1 million.

In June 2014 the 1856 British Guiana one-cent magenta stamp was sold at auction in New York, to an anonymous bidder, for $9.5m (£5.6m) at auction in New York, a world record.

== Independence ==
In 1966 the country achieved independence from the United Kingdom, and changed its name to Guyana. Later stamps were issued by Guyana.

== See also ==
- Arthur D. Ferguson
- Postage stamps and postal history of Guyana
- Revenue stamps of British Guiana

== References and sources ==
Sources

- W.A. Townsend and F.G. Howe, Postage Stamps and Postal History of British Guiana, London, Royal Philatelic Society (August 1970) ISBN 0-900631-01-5
