= Revenue stamp =

Adhesive label used to collect taxes on products

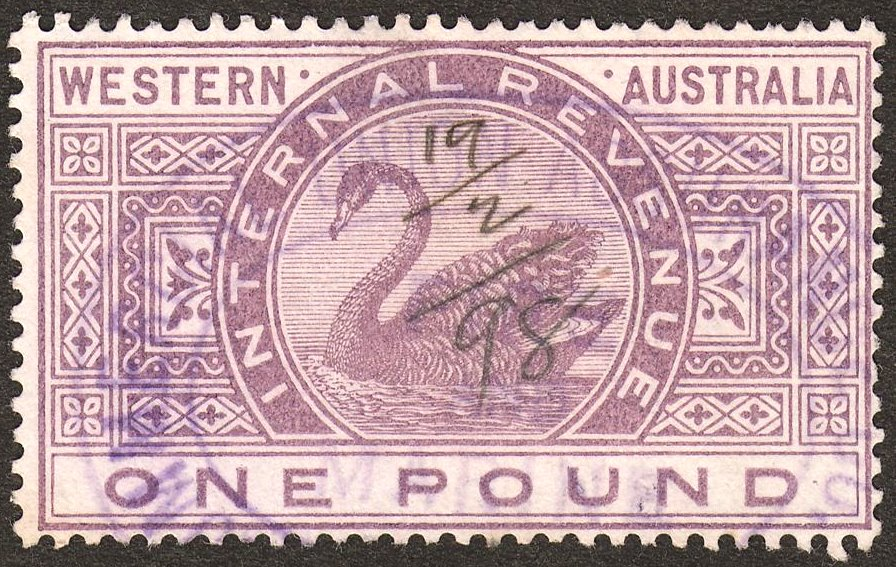
An 1898 £1 revenue stamp of Western Australia

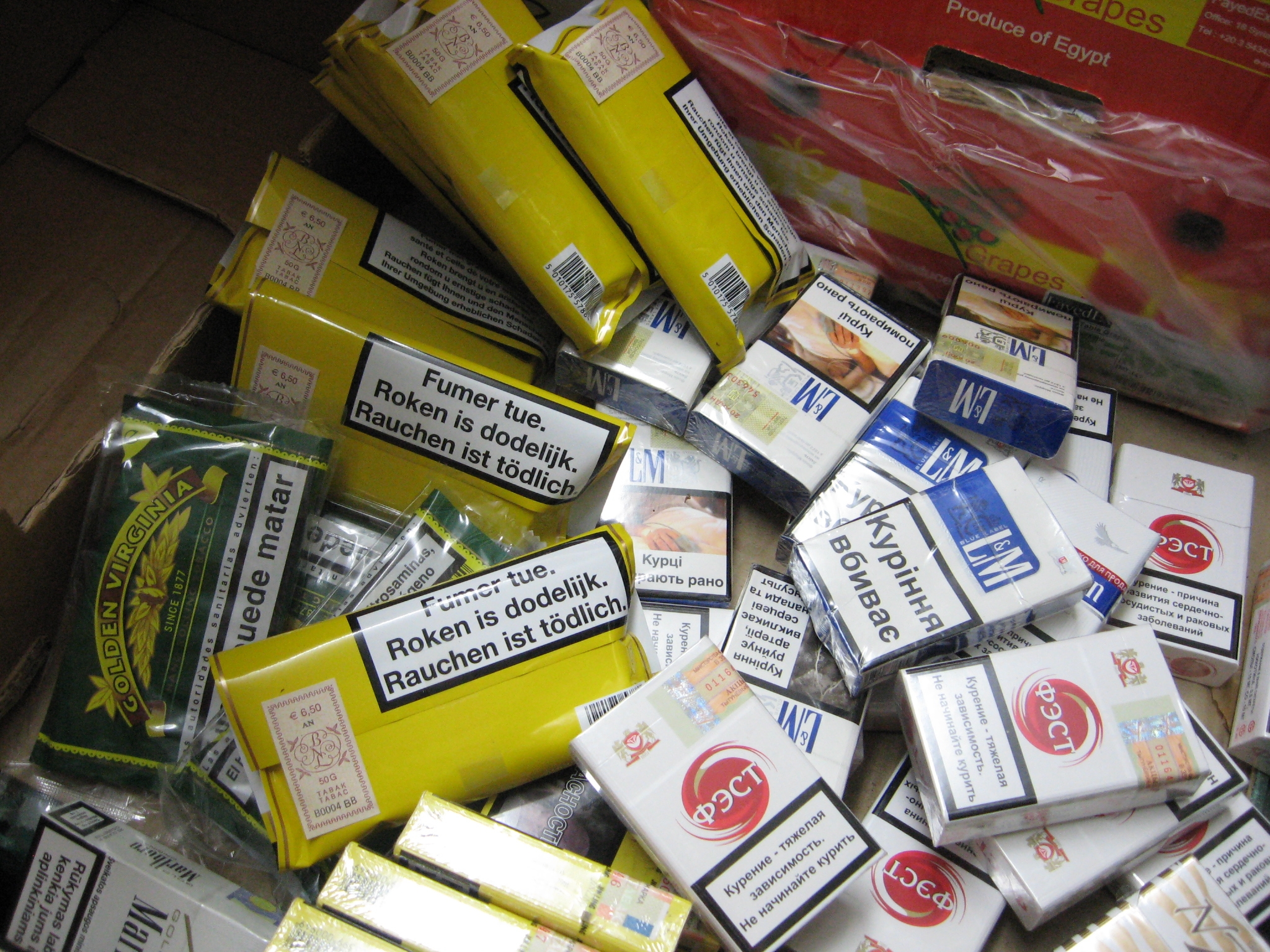
Revenue stamps on smuggled tobacco seized by the British tax authorities.

A revenue stamp, tax stamp, duty stamp or fiscal stamp is a (usually) adhesive label used to designate collected taxes or fees on documents, tobacco, alcoholic drinks, drugs and medicines, playing cards, hunting licenses, firearm registration, and many other things. Typically, businesses purchase the stamps from the government (thereby paying the tax), and attach them to taxed items as part of putting the items on sale, or in the case of documents, as part of filling out the form.

Revenue stamps often look very similar to postage stamps, and in some countries and time periods it has been possible to use postage stamps for revenue purposes, and vice versa. Some countries also issued dual-purpose postage and revenue stamps.

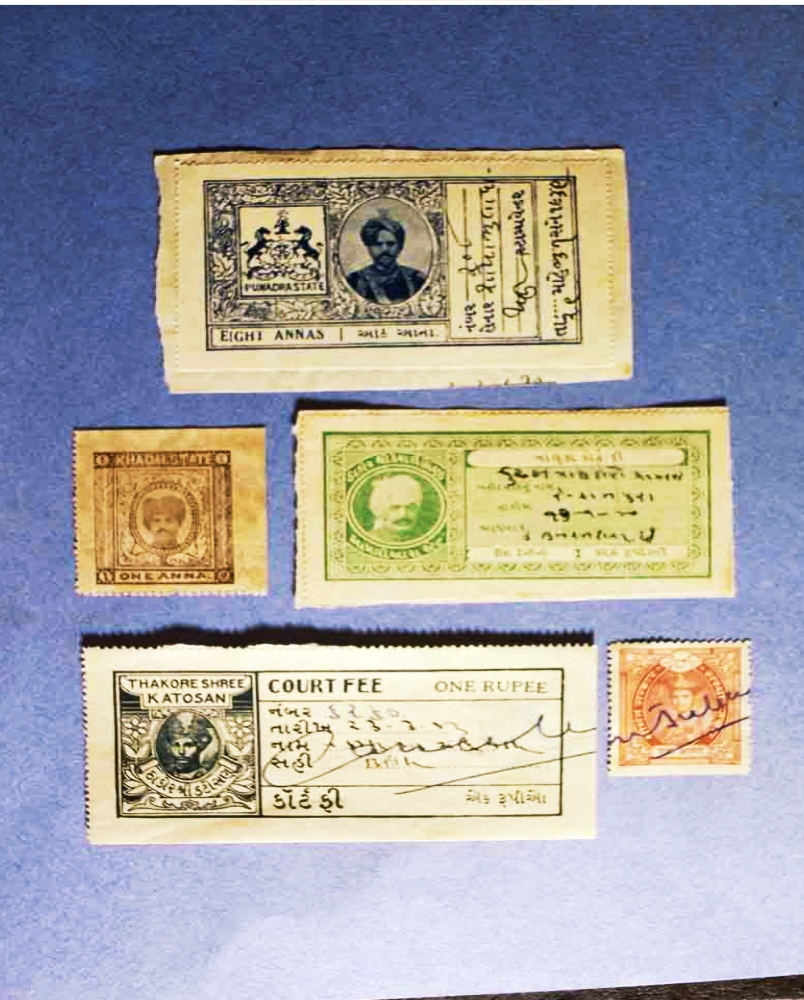
Fiscal stamps of Punadra, Khadal, Ambaliara, Katosan and Jawhar ruled by Koli rulers in India 1947

== Description ==
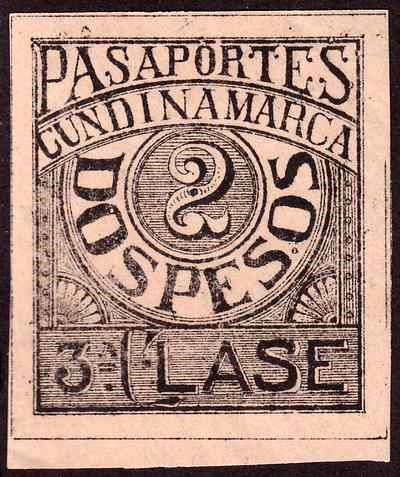
An 1899 passport tax stamp from Cundinamarca in Colombia

Revenue stamps are stamps used to designate collected taxes and fees. They are issued by governments, national and local, and by official bodies of various kinds. They take many forms and may be gummed and ungummed, perforated or imperforate, printed or embossed, and of any size. In many countries, they are as detailed in their design as banknotes; they are often made from the same type of paper. The high value of many revenue stamps means that they may contain security devices to prevent counterfeiting.

The Revenue Society has defined revenue stamps as " ...stamps, whether impressed, adhesive or otherwise, issued by or on behalf of International, National or Local Governments, their Licensees or Agents, and indicate that a tax, duty or fee has been paid or prepaid or that permission has been granted."

== History ==
In the thirteenth and fourteenth centuries, Mogol tax collectors imposed a commercial tax on goods sold in cities or transported through city gates. After the tax was paid, they marked the goods with a seal (tamgha) as proof of payment. These officials were known in Mongolian as tamghachi ("seal/stamp presser").

In the Ottoman Empire, Damga resmi was already in use by the sixteenth century. Records of tax revenue from stamps for silk provide evidence of changes in silk production over time.

The use of revenue stamps goes back further than that of postage stamps (first used in 1840); the stamps of the Stamp Acts of the 18th century were revenues. Their use became widespread in the 19th century, partly inspired by the success of the postage stamp, and partly motivated by the desire to streamline government operations, the presence of a revenue stamp being an indication that the item in question had already paid the necessary fees. Revenue stamps have become less commonly seen in the 21st century, with the rise of computerization and the ability to use numbers to track payments accurately.

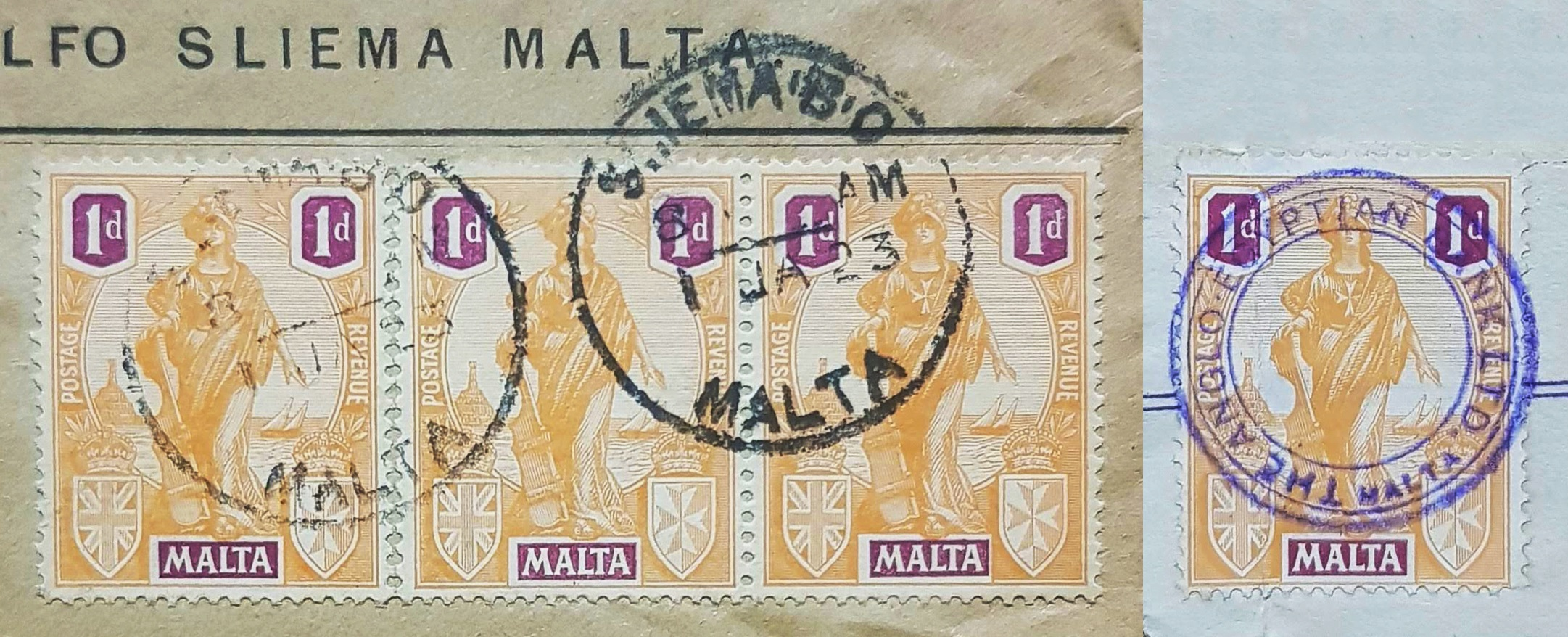
A 1922 Malta 1d stamp from the Melita issue which was valid for both postal and fiscal use. The strip of three on the left was postally used at Sliema, and the single on the right was fiscally used at an Anglo-Egyptian Bank branch

There are many kinds of revenue stamps in the world, and it is likely that many remain unrecorded. Both national and local entities have issued them. Governments have sometimes combined the functions of postage and revenue stamps. In the former British Empire, such stamps were often inscribed "Postage and Revenue" to reflect their dual function. Other countries have simply allowed revenue stamps to be used for postage or vice versa. A revenue stamp authorized subsequently for postal use is known as a postal fiscal. Bhutan, for instance, authorized the use of revenue stamps for postal purposes from 1955 until the first proper postage stamps of the country were issued in 1962. In the Stanley Gibbons catalog, this type of stamp has an F prefix.

== Methods of cancellation ==
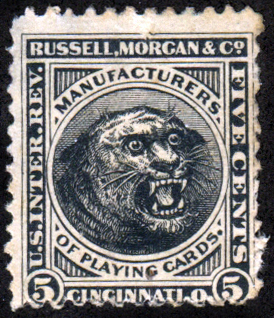
An American revenue stamp for the tax on playing cards

While revenue stamps often resemble postage stamps, they are not normally intended for use on mail and therefore do not receive a postal cancellation. Some countries such as Great Britain have issued stamps valid for both postage and revenue, but this practice is now rare. Many different methods have been used to cancel revenue stamps, including pen cancels, inked handstamps, perforating, embossing, hole punching or simply tearing.

From around 1900, United States revenue stamps were required to be mutilated by cutting, after being affixed to documents, and in addition to being cancelled in ink. A class of office equipment was created to achieve this which became known as "stamp mutilators".

== Collecting ==
Revenue stamps were once widely collected by philatelists and given the same status as postage stamps in stamp catalogues and at exhibitions. After World War One, however, they declined in popularity, possibly due to being excluded from catalogues as the number of postage stamps issued rose rapidly and crowded revenues out.

The lowest point in revenue philately was during the middle years of the twentieth century. A Stanley Gibbons children's stamp album from the 1950s warned in its introduction: "Since Philately is the collecting of stamps that are employed in connection with the Posts, do not put in your album fiscals, telegraph stamps, tobacco-tax labels and other such strange things as are often found in some collections." This is not a definition of philately that would be recognized today.

More recently, revenue philately has become popular again and now has its own FIP (Fédération Internationale de Philatélie) Commission and is an approved category in FIP endorsed stamp exhibitions.

Many catalogues have been issued by specialist publishers and dealers but revenue stamps still do not feature in some of the most popular catalogues, for instance by Stanley Gibbons and Michel, unless they are revenue and postage stamps. However, both the standard Scott and the Scott Specialised United States catalogue feature US revenue stamps. The leading catalogue for revenue stamps of the United Kingdom, the British Commonwealth and several European countries is the Barefoot Catalogue.

== Some types of revenue stamps ==
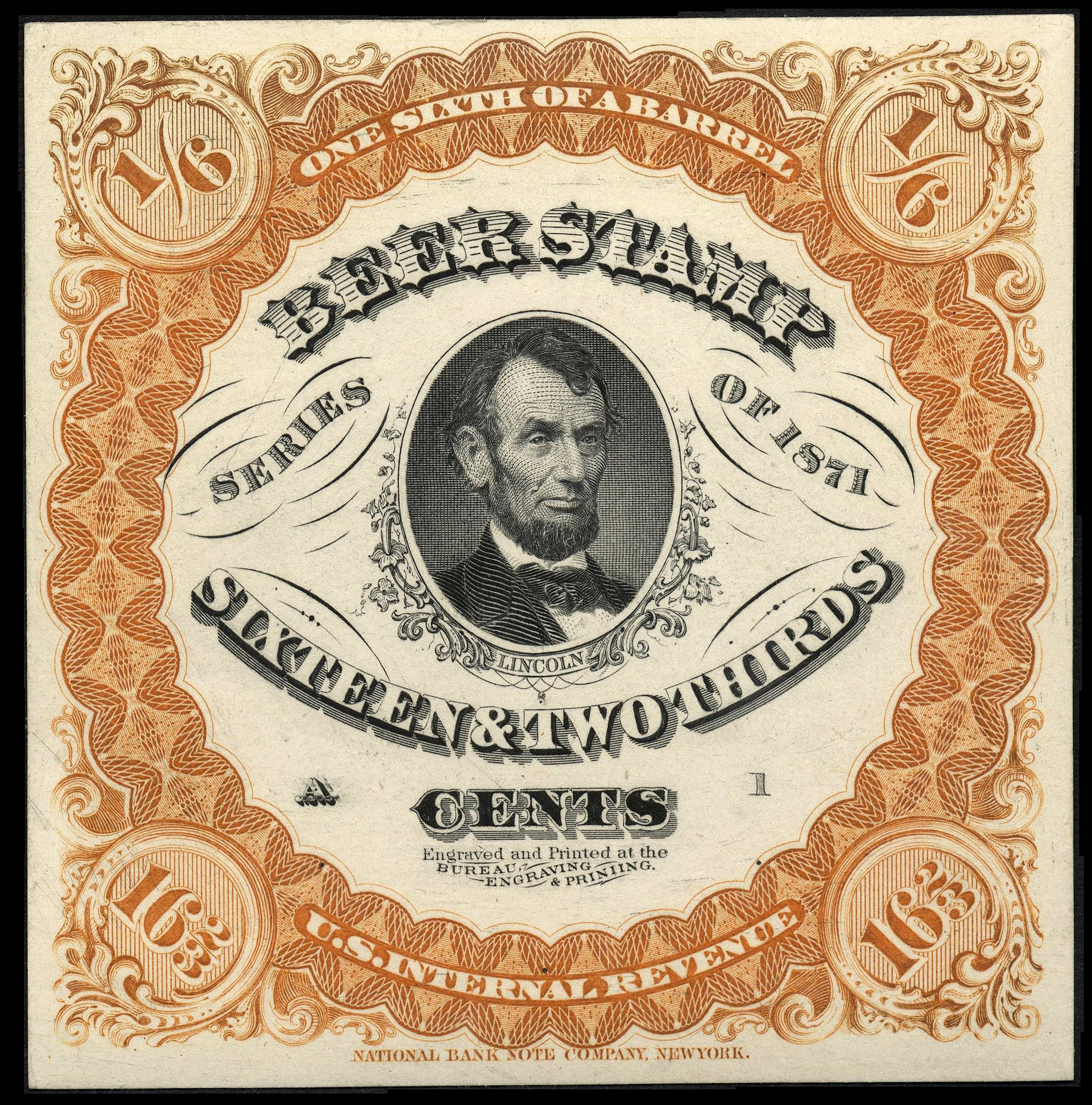
1871 U.S. Revenue stamp for 1/6 Barrel of beer

=== Court fees ===
One of the earliest uses of revenue stamps was to pay court fees. Stamps were used in the Indian feudal states as early as 1797, almost 50 years before the first postal stamps.

Although India is only one of several countries that have used tax stamps on legal documents, it was one of the most prolific users. The practice is almost entirely stopped now, partly due to the prevalence of forgeries which cost the issuing government revenue.

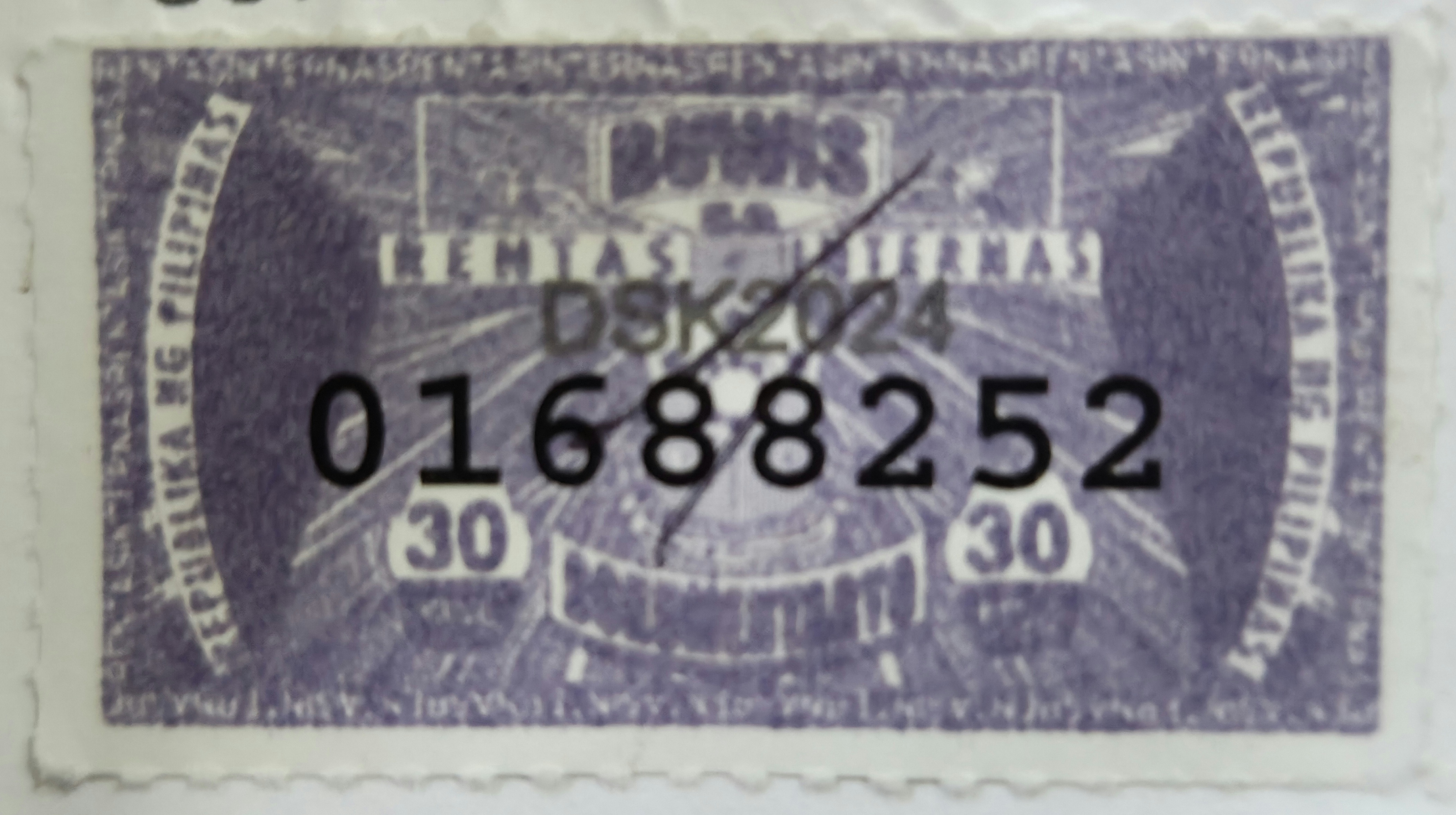
A current Philippine revenue stamp, typically used for Documentary Stamp Tax (DST).

=== Documents ===
The tax on documents, also commonly known as stamp duty, is one of the oldest uses of revenue stamps, probably being invented in Spain, and introduced (or re-invented) in the Netherlands in the 1620s, then reaching France in 1651 and England in 1694. Governments enforce the payment of the tax by making unstamped documents unenforceable in court. The tax has been applied to contracts, tenancy agreements, wills etc. A pre-printed revenue stamp appeared on many hundis of India.

=== Tobacco and alcohol ===
In many countries, tobacco and alcohol are taxed by the use of excise stamps. For instance, the producer may buy stamps from the government which are then affixed to each bottle of alcohol or packet of cigarettes to show that tax has been paid. Often the stamp will be fixed across a seal so that on opening the pack or bottle the stamp is destroyed.

== Gallery ==
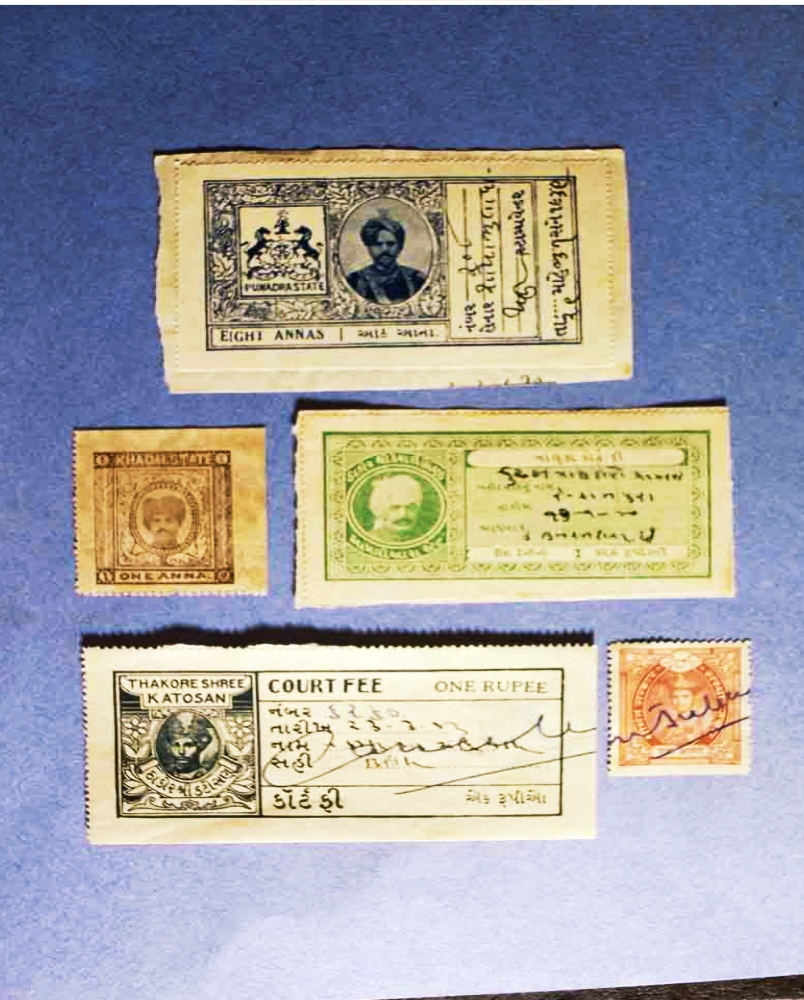
Fiscal stamps of Punadra, Khadal, Ambaliara, Katosan and Jawhar Princely states of Koli rulers in India

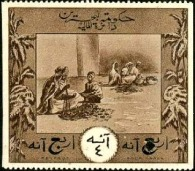
Bahrain 1924 4a revenue stamp

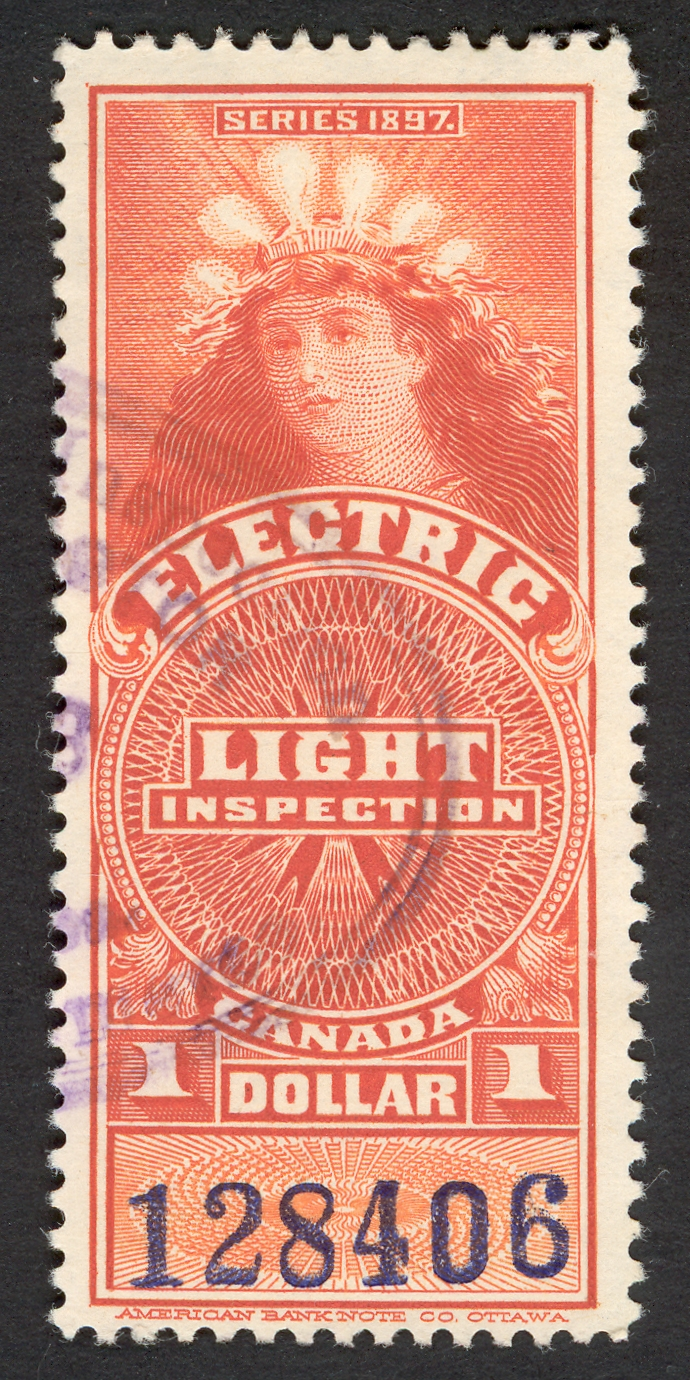
Canada 1897 $1 electric light inspection stamp from the Lady of the Lightbulbs issue

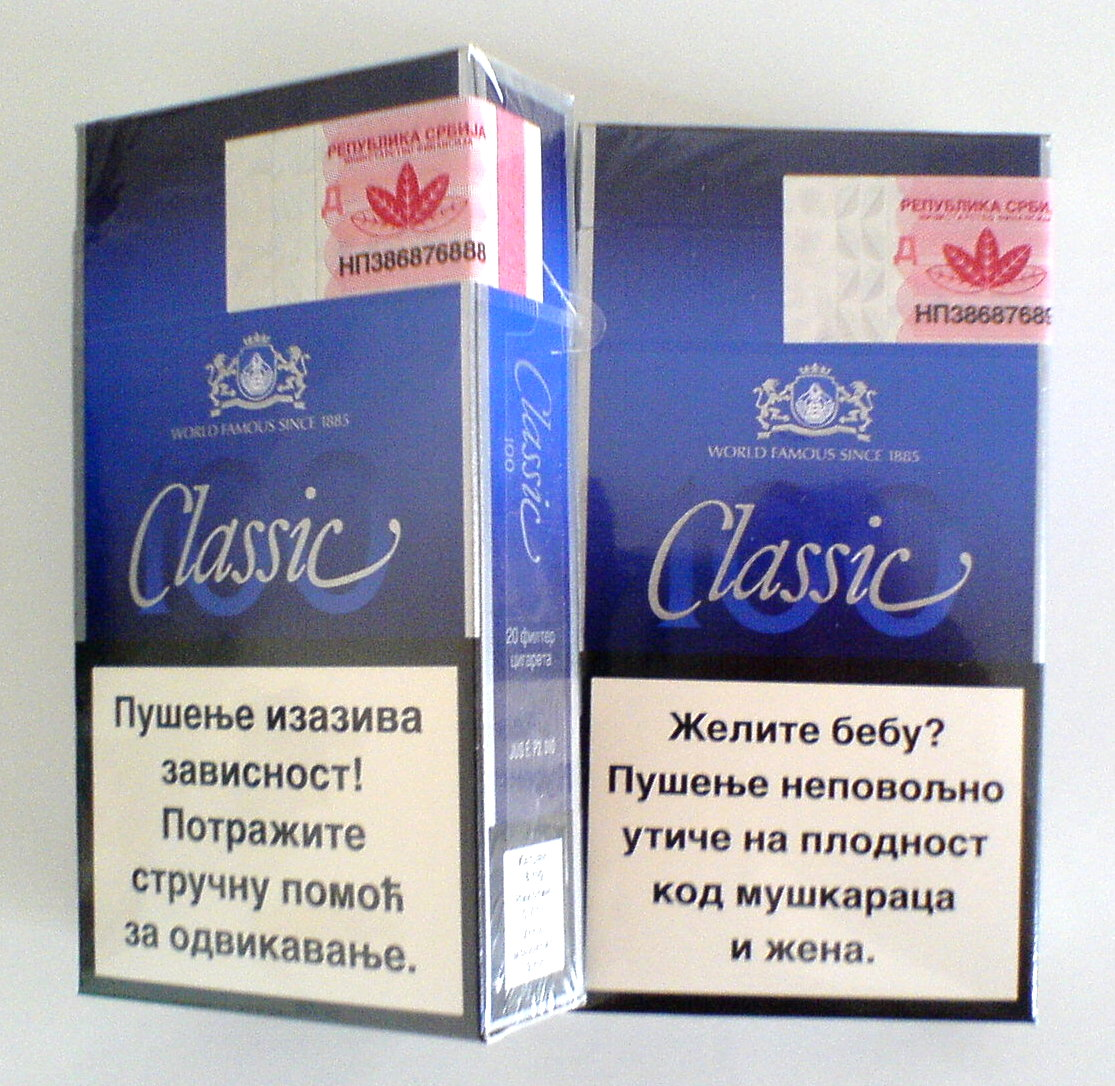
Serbian tobacco tax stamps on cigarette packets

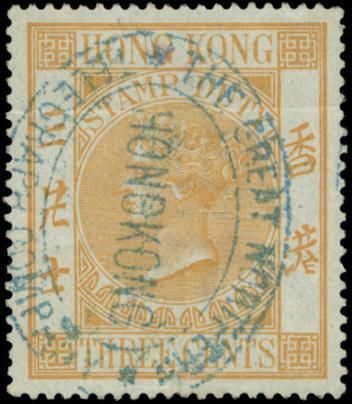
Hong Kong 1867 3c duty stamp

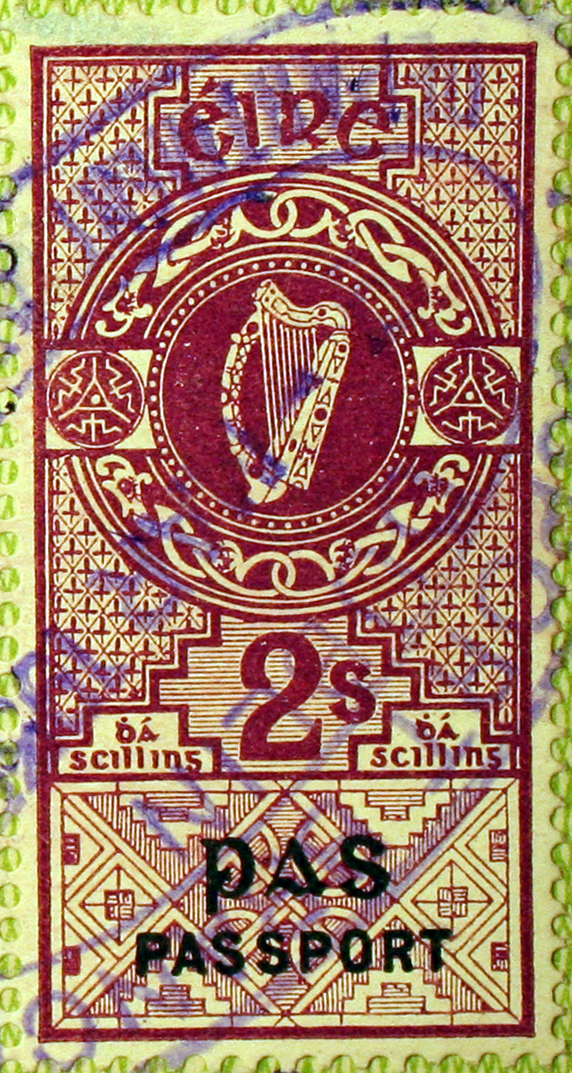
Ireland 1939 2s passport stamp

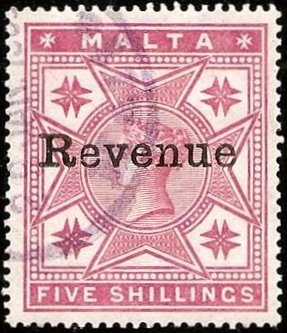
Malta 1899 5s revenue stamp

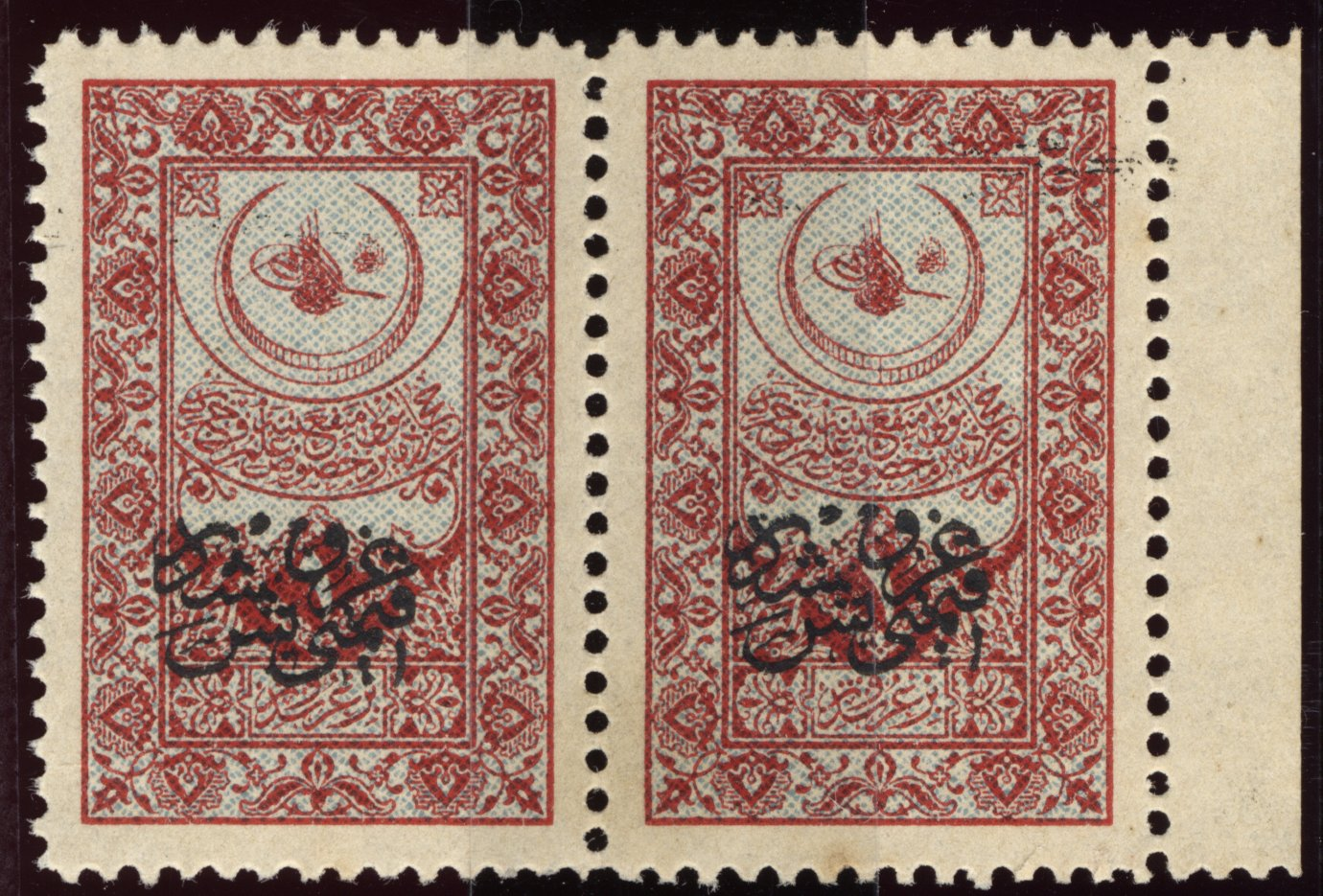
Ottoman Empire 1918 20 pa on 1pi revenue stamp for the construction of Hejaz railway

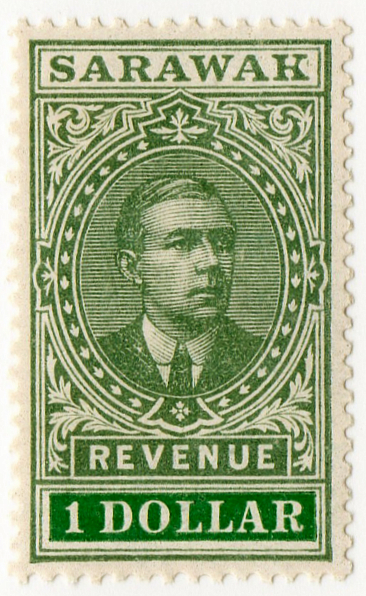
A $1 revenue stamp issued in 1918, featuring Charles Vyner Brooke, the 3rd and last White Rajah of Sarawak

Thrace (under Allied occupation) 1919 30st revenue stamp

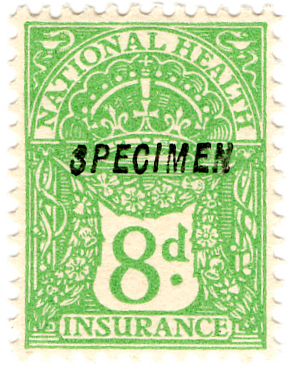
United Kingdom 1920 8d national health insurance stamp overprinted SPECIMEN

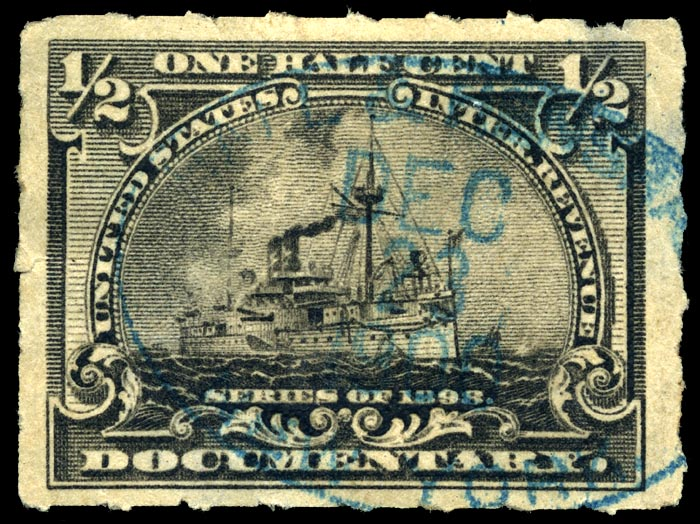
United States of America 1898 ½c documentary stamp from the Battleship issue

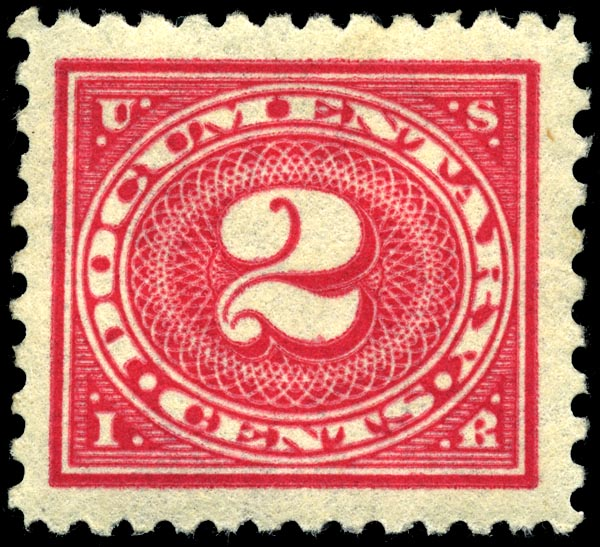
United States of America 1930 2c documentary stamp

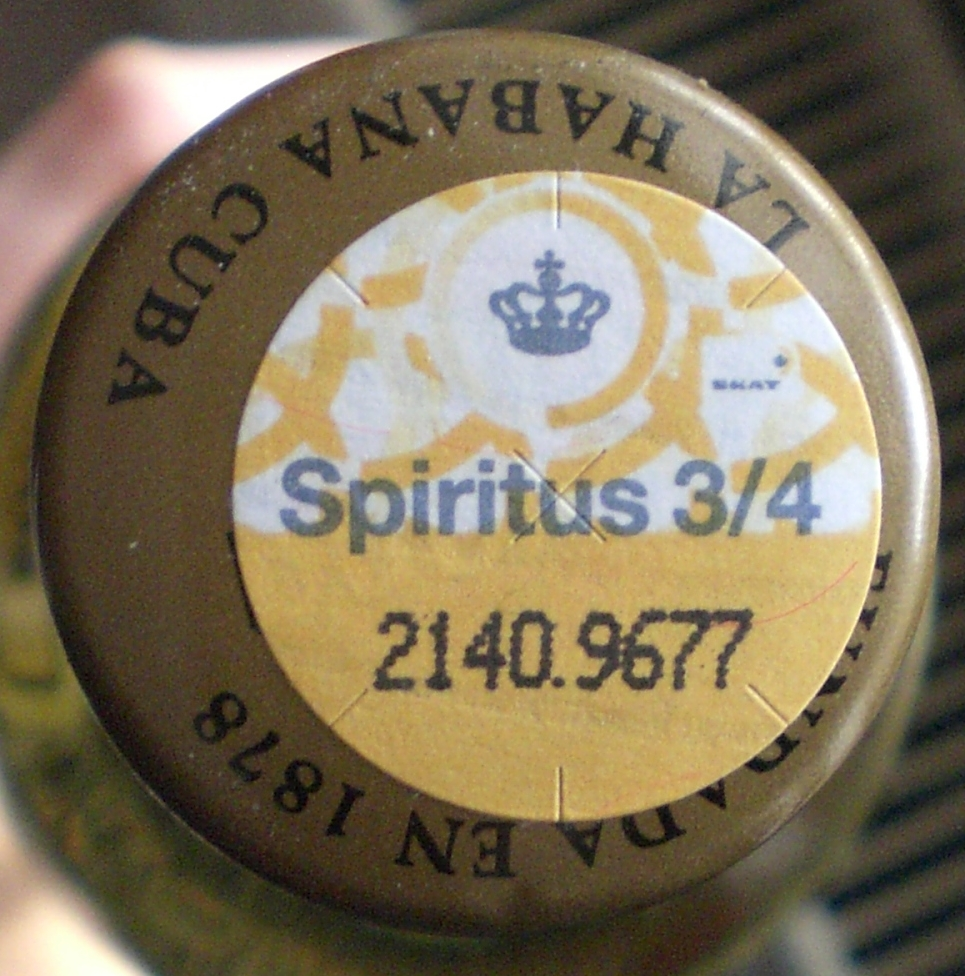
A Danish revenue stamp for spirits

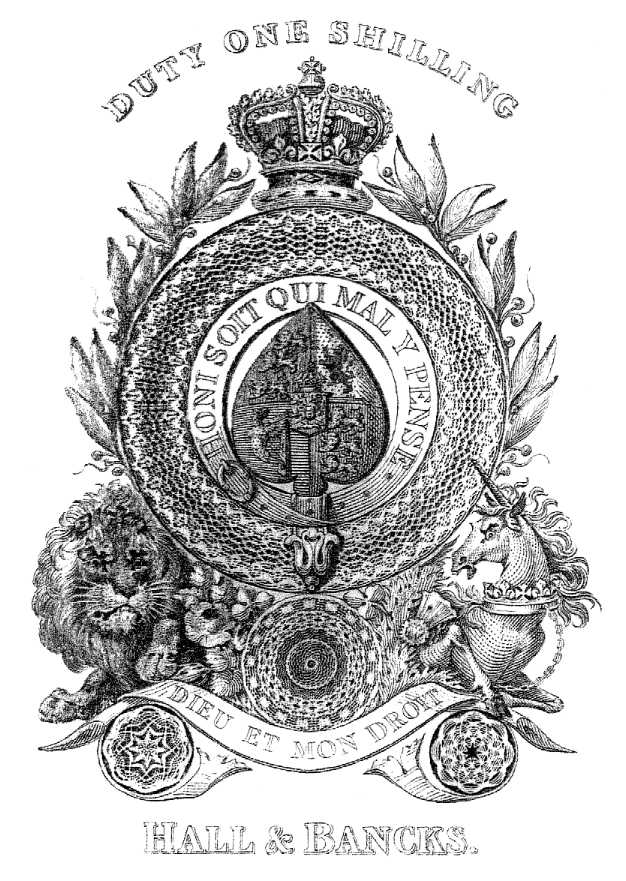
Old Frizzle, an ace of spades with a Stamp duty in the United Kingdom similar to a banknote, see the article: Richard Harding (forger)

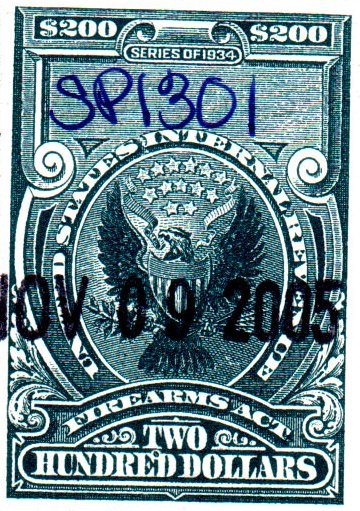
National Firearms Act, $200 stamp

== See also ==
- Impressed duty stamp
- Postal tax stamp, a postal stamp which also raises fiscal revenue
- Stamped paper
- Revenue stamps of the United States
- Ryan Collection, a collection of Budapest municipal revenue stamps
- Stamp duty
- Turner Collection of Newspaper Tax Stamps

== Revenue philatelic societies ==
- American Revenue Association
- Fiscal Philatelic Society
- The Revenue Society
- The State Revenue Society
