= Postage and revenue stamp =

Stamp that may be used to pay for post or revenue

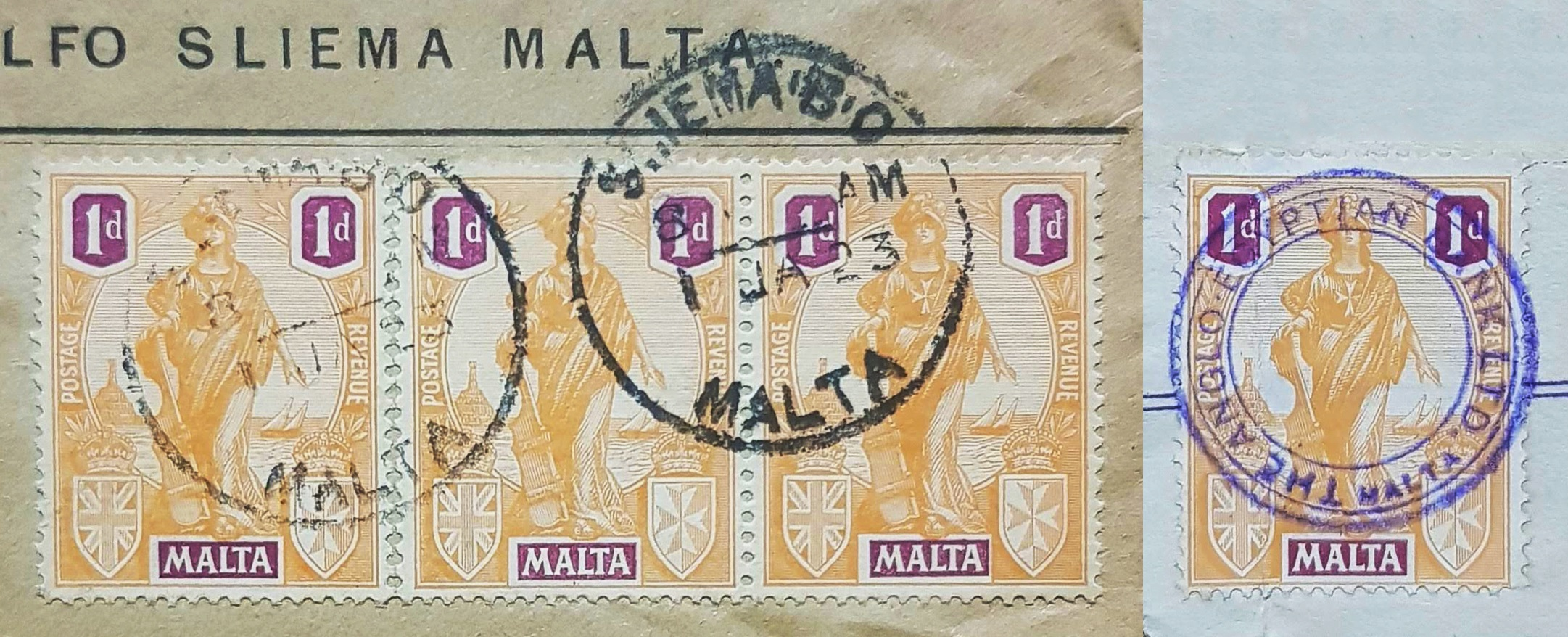
A 1922 Malta stamp from the Melita issue used as a postage stamp (strip of three with Sliema postmarks) and as a revenue stamp (single with an Anglo-Egyptian Bank cancellation)

A postage and revenue stamp, sometimes also called a dual-purpose stamp or a compound stamp, is a stamp which is equally valid for use for postage or revenue purposes. They often but not always bore an inscription such as "Postage and Revenue". Dual-purpose stamps were common in the United Kingdom and the British Empire during the 19th and 20th centuries, and they are still used in some countries as of the early 21st century.

Dual-purpose stamps used for postal purposes usually bear a postmark, while those which are used as revenues bear some form of fiscal cancel (such as a pen cancel, a handstamp or a commercial overprint).

== Use in the British Empire and Commonwealth ==
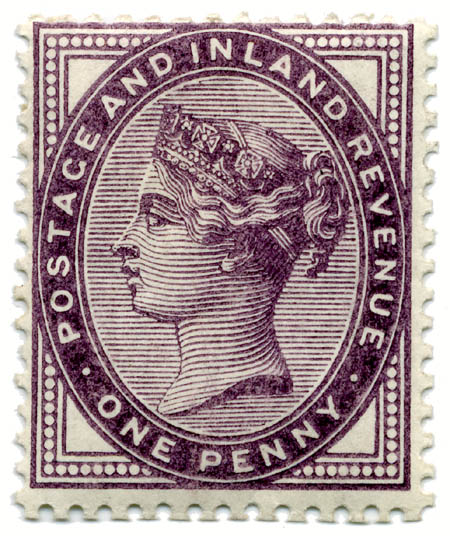
The Penny Lilac of 1881, the UK's first dual-purpose stamp

In 1881, the Customs and Inland Revenue Act was passed in the United Kingdom, and it stated that "stamp duties of one penny may be denoted by postage stamps, and vice versa." This led to dual-purpose stamps being issued, starting with the Penny Lilac of 1881 and the Lilac and Green Issue of 1883–1884. The former was inscribed "Postage and Inland Revenue", while the latter bore the inscription "Postage & Revenue". In addition, existing postage and Inland Revenue stamps became valid for both purposes. Many British stamps with denominations up to 2s6d were valid for both postal and fiscal use until 1968, and most definitive and some commemorative stamps issued during this period were duly inscribed.

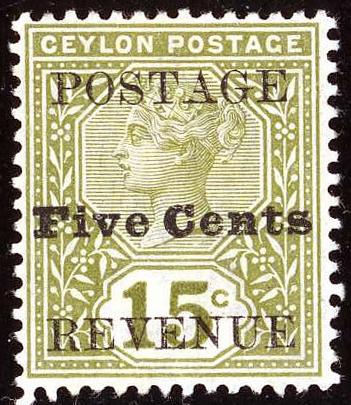
A Ceylon postage stamp overprinted as a dual-purpose stamp in 1890

The use of dual-purpose stamps in the various colonies of the British Empire began in the 19th century. Some postage or revenue stamps did not have an inscription indicating their intended use, and they were unofficially used for both purposes. In the 1880s, some colonies officially permitted dual-purpose stamps, while some existing revenue stamps became valid for postal use (as postal fiscals). Most British colonies issued stamps bearing inscriptions such as "Postage & Revenue" between the late 19th and early 20th centuries, and some countries such as Ceylon overprinted existing stocks of postage stamps with that inscription. Some high value stamps which bore these inscriptions were primarily intended for fiscal use and were almost exclusively used as such, but their inscriptions theoretically also made them postage stamps and they are therefore listed in postage stamp catalogues.

In some cases, the issue of dual-purpose stamps created problems regarding the division of income between the post office and the treasury. Some colonies such as Malta and Natal switched a number of times between having separate and dual-purpose issues.

After the late 1930s many colonies dropped the "Postage & Revenue" inscription from their stamps, but many stamps remained valid for both uses. A few current or former British colonies such as Montserrat and Nevis continue to issue dual-purpose stamps in the early 21st century.

== Use in other countries ==
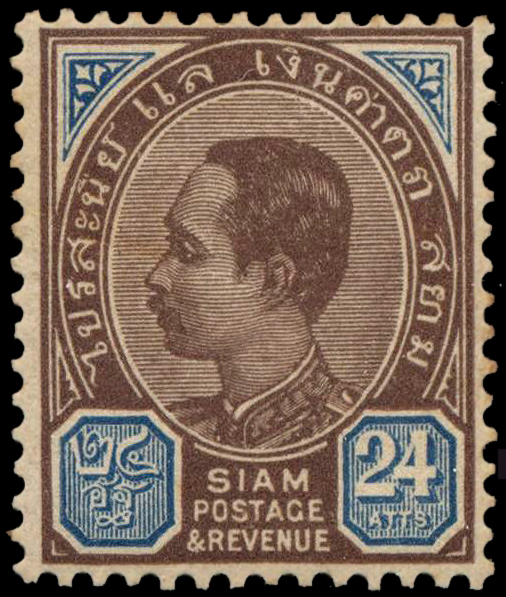
Thai postage and revenue stamp from 1899

Some stamps of Thailand (then known as Siam) issued between 1887 and 1904 were inscribed "Postage & Revenue". Some countries such as Iceland also allowed postage stamps to be used for certain fiscal purposes without having an inscription on the stamps themselves.

== Collecting ==
Stamp collectors generally prefer dual-purpose stamps which were used for postal purposes rather than ones which were used as revenues. Due to this, fiscally used stamps tend to be cheaper than postally used ones.

== See also ==
- Postal fiscal stamp, which refers to postal use of a revenue stamp
