= Postage stamps and postal history of Guyana =

A 2003 stamp of Guyana

Guyana became independent from Great Britain on 26 May 1966 and began producing its own stamps as an independent nation from that date. Previously the country was British Guiana and had printed stamps. In 1969, some issues were put on the market cancelled to order in such a way as to be indistinguishable from genuine postally used copies.

Between 2010 and 2013, Guyana issued many provisional surcharges.

== See also ==
- Postage stamps and postal history of British Guiana
- Revenue stamps of Guyana
