= Khadal State =

Indian town and former minor Princely state in Gujarat

Khadal is a town and former minor Princely state in Gujarat, western India.

== History ==
Khadal was a Fourth Class princely state and taluka, comprising twelve more villages, covering eight square miles in Mahi Kantha.

It had a combined population of 2,215 in 1901, yielding a state revenue of 16,450 Rupees (less than half from land), paying tributes of 1,751 Rupees to the Gaekwad Baroda State and 250 Rupees to Attarsumba.
