= Punadra =

Village in Gujarat, India

Coordinates: 23°06′N 72°58′E

Punadra is a town in the Gandhinagar district of Gujarat in western India.

== History ==
Punadra was a Fourth Class princely state and taluka, comprising ten more villages, covering eleven square miles in Mahi Kantha.

It had a combined population of 2,662 in 1901, yielding a state revenue of 15,598 Rupees (mostly from land), paying a tribute of 375 Rupees to the Gaekwad Baroda State.

== Places of interest ==
The village has an old fort from the time of Mahmud Begada (1459–1511).
