= Coat of arms of Guyana =

Versions
- Coat of arms of the President
- Armiger: Co-operative Republic of Guyana
- Adopted: 25 February 1966
- Crest: An Amerindian head-dress (also called a Cacique's Crown) with two diamonds on the sides; a helmet Or; Mantling Azure and Argent
- Torse: Azure and Argent
- Shield: Argent, three barrulets wavy Azure; in chief a Victoria regia lily, Guyana's national flower; in base the national bird, the Canje Pheasant (Opisthocomus hoazin)
- Supporters: Jaguars with pick axe and stalks of rice and sugar cane
- Motto: One People, One Nation, One Destiny

The coat of arms of Guyana was granted by the College of Arms on 25 February 1966.

It includes a crest of an Amerindian head-dress symbolising the indigenous people of the country, this crest is also called the Cacique's Crown; two diamonds at the sides of the head-dress representing mining industry; a helmet; two jaguars as supporters holding a pick axe, sugar cane, and a stalk of rice (symbolising Guyana's mining, sugar and rice industries); a shield decorated with the Victoria amazonica lily, Guyana's national flower; three blue wavy lines representing the three main rivers of Guyana; and the national bird, the Canje Pheasant (Opisthocomus hoazin). The national motto, "One people, One Nation, One Destiny", appears on the scroll below the shield.

== British Guiana ==
Colony of British Guiana
Emblem	Period of use	Notes
	1875–1906	Colonial badge of British Guiana, based on the seal of the Dutch West India Company. Depicting a sailing vessel with full sails. Before this, the royal arms of the United Kingdom was used by the colonial authorities.
	1906–1955	The badge remained the same but was further augmented with a golden strap surrounding the badge with the Latin motto "DAMUS PETIMUSQUE VICISSIM" (We Give and Take in Return). The design of the sailing ship was changed slightly.
	1955–1966	On 8 December 1954 a coat of arms was granted to the colony by the College of Arms in London. It depicted a Blackwall frigate in full sails, sailing to the sinister on waves of the sea, all proper. The same motto is written on a ribbon below the shield. Used until independence.

== Symbolism ==
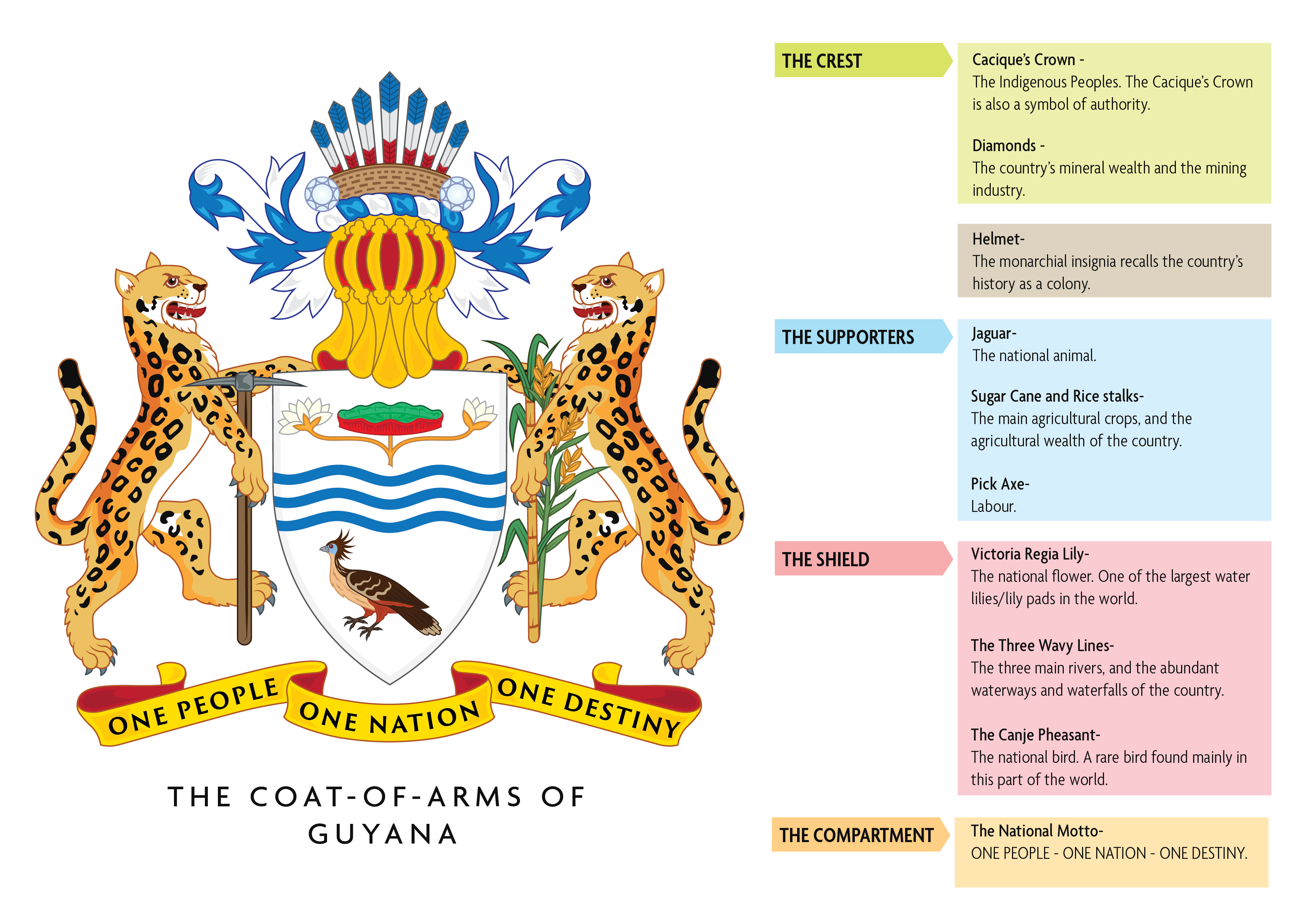
Guyana coat of arms explained

The symbolism of the coat of arms of Guyana is as follows:

- The Amerindian head-dress, the Cacique Crown, symbolises the Amerindians as the indigenous people of the country.
- The two diamonds at the sides of the head-dress represent the country’s mining industry.
- The helmet, on which the Cacique Crown rests, is the monarchical insignia.
- The two jaguars rampant, holding a pick-axe, a sugar cane, and a stalk of rice, symbolise labour and the two main agricultural industries of the country, sugar and rice.
- The shield, which is decorated with the national flower, the Victoria Regia Lily, is to protect the nation.
- The three blue wavy barrulets represent the three great rivers and many waters of Guyana.
- The Canje Pheasant at the bottom of the shield is a rare bird found principally in this part of the world and represents the rich fauna of Guyana.

== See also ==
- Flag of Guyana
- Postage stamps and postal history of British Guiana
