= Pen cancel =

Cancellation of a stamp by writing on it

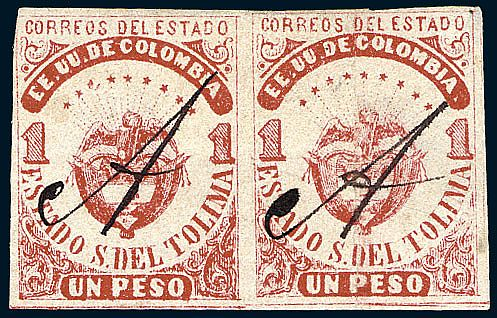
Stamps of Tolima with a pen cancel

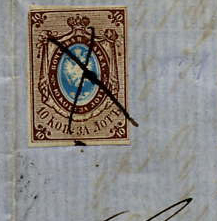
A pen cancel on a Russian postage stamp

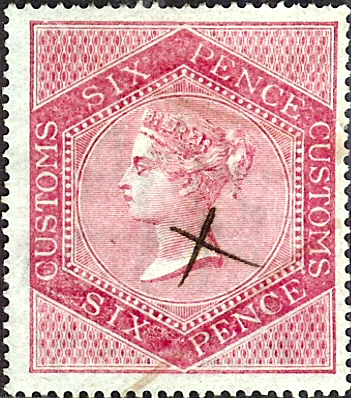
A pen cancel on a revenue stamp

In philately, a pen cancel – symbol ⟨⟩ – is a cancellation of a postage or revenue stamp by the use of a pen, marker or crayon.

== Usage ==
In the early days of stamps, cancellation with a pen was common. Today stamps are almost always cancelled with an inked handstamp or a machine cancel as this is quicker to apply. Pen cancels are still sometimes seen today when a postal official needs to cancel stamps missed by the automatic cancelling machine.

There are no fixed terms for the different types of pen cancels, but a cancel in the form of two crossed lines has been referred to as an X cancel. Pen cancels may also take the form of notations by the canceller, the city in which the item was posted or the initials of the local postmaster.

A pen cancel may indicate fiscal (revenue) use; however, in the early days of stamps a pen cancel was sometimes used because no handstamp was available, for instance in Nicaragua where pen cancels were used for seven years after their first stamps appeared in 1862.

== Values ==
A used postage stamp with a pen cancel is usually worth much less than a stamp cancelled using a handstamp or machine. In particular, the additional information from the handstamp is lost and the pen cancel may indicate fiscal (revenue) rather than postal use. Pen cancelling is, however, a common method of cancelling stamps used fiscally. Stamps marked valid for both postage and revenue use are usually worth less when fiscally used.

== Tampering ==
Some people have attempted to remove pen cancels from used stamps in order to make them appear as more valuable mint stamps.
