= Postal fiscal stamp =

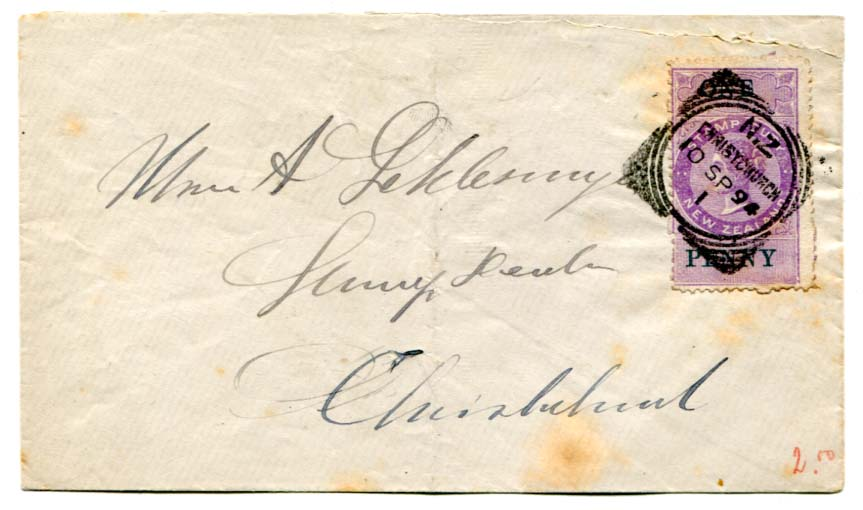
A New Zealand stamp duty revenue stamp used postally in Christchurch, New Zealand, 1894

A postal fiscal is a revenue stamp that has been authorised for postal use. Postal fiscals may arise because there is a shortage of postage stamps for a country or out of economy to use up obsolete or excess stocks of revenue stamps. Postal fiscals are to be distinguished from stamps marked "Postage and Revenue" which were always intended for either use, or revenue stamps used postally by accident or because local postal regulations did not prohibit such use. Postal fiscal status may usually only be identified from the cancels on used stamps or where the stamp is found on cover.

== United Kingdom ==
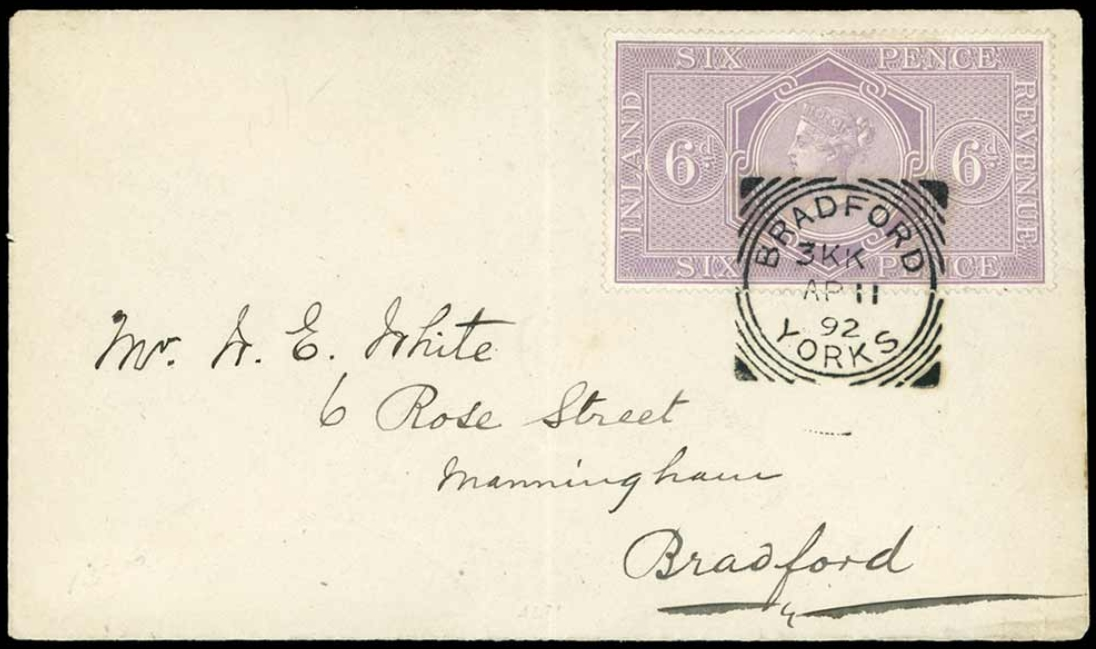
A British 6d Inland Revenue stamp used at Bradford, 1892

Postal fiscals were authorised from 1 June 1881. These stamps were also postally valid in British colonies such as Malta which used British stamps at that time and in British post offices abroad in places such as Beirut.

== New Zealand ==
From 1 April 1882 revenue stamps became valid for postal use and vice versa. This continued until the 1960s. New Zealand fiscals overprinted for various Pacific islands were similarly valid for postal purposes, and in islands such as Niue and Tokelau they were only used postally and were not valid for fiscal use.

== Other countries ==
Several other countries have used postal fiscal stamps, including Bechuanaland, Dominica, Hong Kong, Tobago, Venezuela and Western Australia.

== See also ==
- Postal tax stamp A postage stamp with a charitable surcharge.
- Semi-postal A postage stamp with a charitable surcharge.
- Postage and revenue stamp
