= Local postal surcharge labels =

Local postal surcharge labels issued at Ankang in Shaanxi Province

Local postal surcharge labels are a class of labels applied widely to Chinese internal mail between January 1987 and February 1999. They have also been called Additional Charge Labels and Added Charge Labels.

== Background ==
In China, local provincial governments collect and supply the postal services but the charges are set by the national government. Increasing inflation meant that by 1987 the amount charged for postal services was less than the cost of providing those services. Local governments therefore requested an increase in postal rates but this was refused by the national government. The local governments were allowed, however, to levy an additional charge on certain outgoing mail items to defray their costs and in January 1987 the first local postal surcharge label was used in Guangdong.

== Use ==
The labels quickly became popular and, eventually, labels were issued in 25 different provinces. Around 1500 different labels are known. The rules set for their use were as follows:

- The charges were not to apply to international mail.
- The charges were to be created and collected locally.
- The charges only applied to items that had already had postage applied above the lowest rate, e.g. parcels and registered letters.
- The additional charge was to be noted on the item and the sender given a receipt.
- The labels were not to resemble postage stamps. (In practice many did)

Recording the extra charge was done in a variety of ways, including manuscript marks, postal chop marks, extra postage stamps and printed labels.

Where printed labels were used they were of widely varying designs and could be of one, two or three parts to enable record keeping. Some were multi-coloured, perforated and similar to postage stamps like the label from Ankang shown above, others were crude productions in one colour similar to tickets or store receipts.

== Banning ==
Local governments and postal officials successfully seized the opportunity to raise additional funds. Hubei province, for instance, introduced a rule that from 1 January 1993 a charge be made to finance postal development and a label was issued by a postmaster in Susong in support of China's bid for the 2000 Olympic Games. As time went on more stamp-like labels were produced and they were often banned by the central government within days of issue. Some may well have been purely philatelic issues with no genuine function.

The use of the labels was never popular with the Chinese government and eventually it was banned completely in 1999.

== Classification ==
The wide variety of the labels and their varying use mean that they defy easy philatelic classification. They are not strictly local stamps, although locally produced, and not stamps of the central government of China. The charge levied may be seen as a form of local tax on each letter originating in a particular province, in which case they fall into the category of fiscal or revenue stamps. Labels produced purely for philatelic purposes or outside of the rules are cinderella stamps.

== Collecting ==
Philatelists prefer to collect these labels on cover as this gives the fullest information about the label and confirms genuine postal use. No definitive catalogue exists of all the labels used as the Chinese government initially suppressed their display at stamp exhibitions and it is likely that many items remain to be discovered and catalogued. Much of what has been published in this area is in Chinese.

Collectors have used postcodes printed on the labels to indicate probable origins and as a method of classification.

== See also ==
- China Stamp Society
- China Philatelic Society of London
- Postage stamps and postal history of China
