= Golden Monkey stamp =

Chinese postage stamp

Golden Monkey Stamp
- Country of production: People's Republic of China
- Date of production: 15 February 1980
- Designer: Huang Yongyu; Shao Bolin
- Commemorates: Chinese year of the Monkey
- No. in existence: Up to 5 million
- Face value: 8 fen

The Golden Monkey Stamp or Gēngshēn Monkey is a postage stamp issued in China in 1980 of which 5 million copies were printed. Although not rare, the stamp has come to symbolise the strong market for collectable postage stamps in Asia. Demand for the stamp has made it one of the most sought after contemporary Chinese stamps.

== Technical details ==
The stamp was designed by Huang Yongyu and Shao Bolin and printed by the photogravure and recess printing methods. It is perforated 11.5.

== Chinese New Year stamps ==
The stamp is in the popular Chinese zodiac series for the Chinese new year, the most recent of which is the 2011 Year of the Rabbit stamp which sold out at post offices in China within a few hours. In Chinese culture the number 8 and the colour red are both seen as lucky.

== Philatelic value ==
Although the stamp was initially common, a full sheet of 80 sold for 1.2 million yuan ($180,000 or £117,200) in 2011 with a single stamp selling for 10,000 yuan ($1,500), which was 125,000 times more than its original price of 8 fen. The stamp had a catalogue value of US$10 unused and US$5 used in 1988. In August 2011, a complete sheet sold for HK$1.44M (£117,300) in Zurich Asia's Hong Kong sale, and another sheet sold for HK$1.495,000 (£122,700) at an InterAsia sale in September 2011.

== Forgeries ==
The stamp has become so valuable that it has been repeatedly forged.

== See also ==
- Asian philately
- China Philatelic Society of London
- China Stamp Society
- Postage stamps and postal history of the People's Republic of China
