= Asian philately =

Asian philately, or Far-Eastern philately, is a specialized area of philately which focuses on the stamps of China, Japan, Hong Kong and neighboring countries. Stamp collectors and stamp dealers often specialize in a particular aspect of Asian philately, and many stamp auctions are devoted to this area of interest. Hong Kong is a major center for Asian philately with Chinese collectors and investors some of the biggest buyers.

== Notable items ==
=== The Chinese Red Revenues ===
So called because of their colour, these stamps are highly sought after by collectors.

=== The Golden Monkey stamp ===
In addition to interest in rarities by advanced collectors there has been spirited public interest in stamps such as the Golden Monkey the 1980 Chinese zodiac stamp which is considered auspicious. A full sheet of this stamp, which is not rare — 5 million were printed, sold in 2011 for $180,000 with a single stamp selling for $1,500. This stamp had a catalogue value of $10 unused and $5 used in 1988. Demand for Chinese zodiac stamps extends to current issues such as the Year of the Rabbit stamp issued in 2011 with supplies selling out at post offices in China within a few hours.

== See also ==
- Postage stamps and postal history of China
- Postage stamps and postal history of Hong Kong
- Postage stamps and postal history of Japan
