= Postage stamps and postal history of Taiwan =

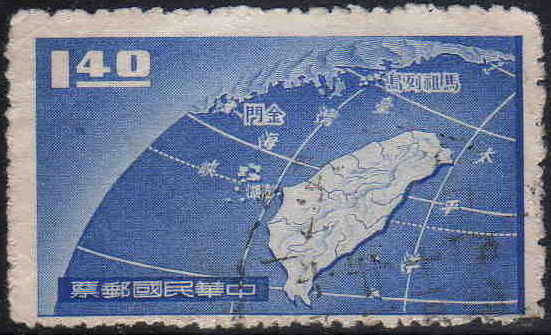
A 1959 stamp of Taiwan

This is a survey of the postage stamps and postal history of Taiwan, otherwise known as Formosa, and currently governed by the Republic of China.

The Republic of China comprises the islands of Taiwan, Penghu, Kinmen, Matsu, and other minor islands, which are located off the east coast of mainland China. Neighboring states include the People's Republic of China to the west, Japan to the north-east, and the Philippines to the south.

== Early post ==
In 1886 Taiwan was upgraded from a prefecture to a province. A postal service was organised by Governor Liu Mingchuan, and postage stamps were issued the same year.

== Republic of Formosa ==
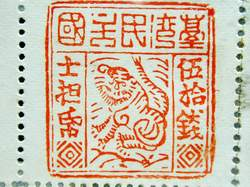
A stamp of the Republic of Formosa

In 1895 China ceded Taiwan to Japan. The Taiwanese reacted by establishing the short-lived Republic of Formosa, which issued its own stamps. The republic is often called the "Black Flag Republic" in philatelic contexts.

== Japanese rule ==
Under Japanese rule, Taiwanese mail was handled as part of the Japanese postal system. After the surrender of Japan in August 1945, the postal system continued to operate locally, and on 21 October 1945, it issued 3-sen and 5-sen stamps, the design consisting of a large numeral and the imperial chrysanthemum. Despite the official transfer of Taiwan to the Republic of China on 25 October, on the 31st a 10-sen stamp of the same design was issued. (An additional five values were printed but never issued.)

== Republic of China (since 1945) ==
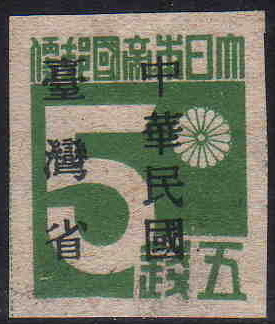
A 1945 stamp of Taiwan

The locally printed stamps, both issued and unissued, were immediately overprinted with "Chinese Republic" and "Taiwan Province" and went on sale 4 November. Two Japanese stamps, the 5-yen and 10-yen values of the 1937 pictorial series, were also overprinted, serving as the high values.

Throughout 1946, stocks of Chinese stamps were overprinted with new values in sen and "for use in Taiwan only". This was followed by an issue in March 1947 marking Chiang Kai-shek's 60th birthday; four small characters in the background say "for Taiwan only". Subsequent stamp issues followed the same pattern through 1948.

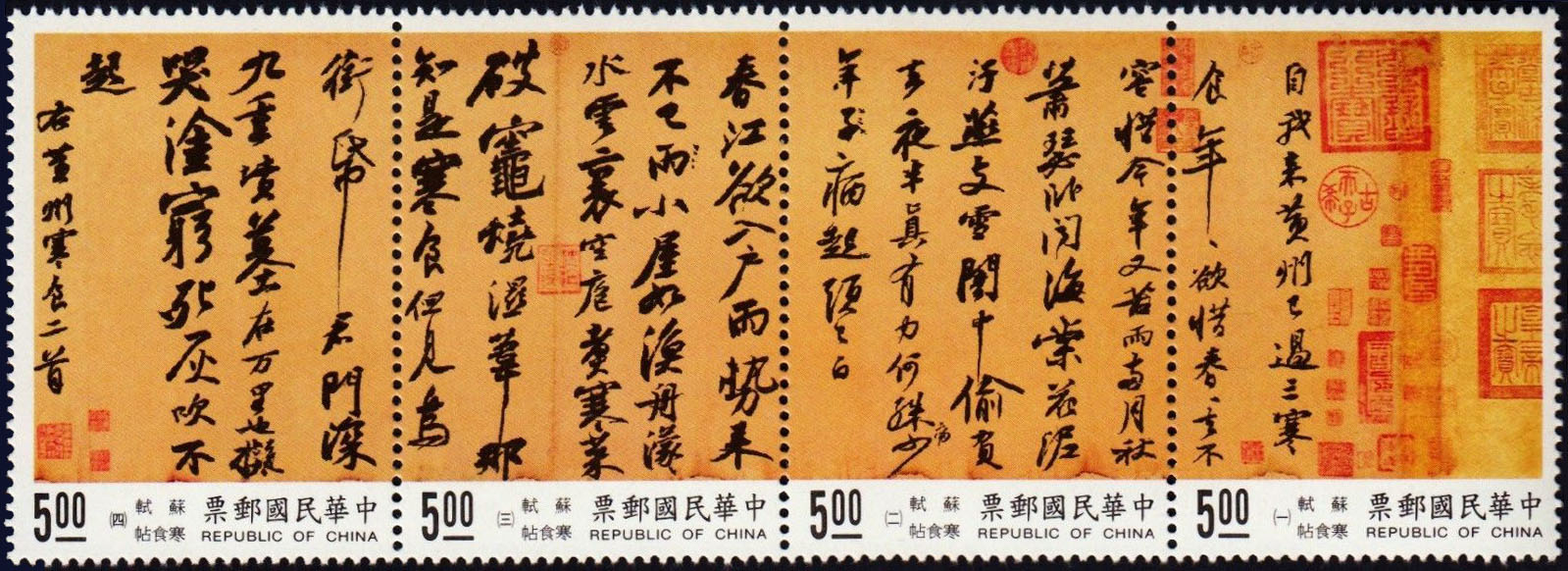
Stamps of Taiwan, 1995

With the loss of mainland China, there was no longer any purpose in separate issues for Taiwan.

The Ju Guang Lou tower on Kinmen was featured on several of the definitive series of the 1960s.

Since 2008, stamps are inscribed "Republic of China (Taiwan)".

== See also ==
- Chunghwa Post
- China Philatelic Society of London
- China Stamp Society
- Postage stamps and postal history of China
- Sun Yat-sen stamps

== References and sources ==
Sources

- Scott catalogue
