= James Negus =

British philatelist (1927–2008)

James Negus

James Negus (22 February 1927 – 22 February 2008) was a British philatelist and book editor.

== Early life ==
Jim Negus was a student of chemistry and then a civil servant. Later he worked as a literary editor for British publishing houses.

== Stanley Gibbons ==
He had already published some philatelic books at Heinemann when he was hired in 1975 by Stanley Gibbons to manage its philatelic and numismatic publications. In 1977, he was promoted to editor of the Stanley Gibbons stamp catalogue. He decided its thematic and geographic division into 21 volumes but in 1981 he was made redundant as part of an economy plan.

== The Connoisseur catalogue of Machin stamps ==
Negus was a major contributor to the long-running series The Connoisseur catalogue of Machin stamps.

== Collecting ==
Negus was a member of many philatelic societies and contributed numerous articles to their journals. His interests were diverse. In 1957 he was the first Editor of the Journal of Chinese Philately of the China Philatelic Society of London. In the 1980s, he studied souvenirs created and distributed for British philatelic exhibitions.

In 2000, Negus stopped all philatelic activity and sold his book and stamp collections in order to concentrate on non-philatelic interests. He lived at Milford on Sea, Hampshire until his death in February 2008.

Ron Butler, President of the Royal Philatelic Society London in the 1970s, described him as "the best of bibliographers and [...] the most competent of researchers".

His brother, Ron Negus, was a philatelic author too and honorary archivist of the Royal Philatelic Society London.

== Selected publications ==
- Polish definitive issues, 1920-1925: A summary of the recorded papers, perforations and major varieties (European philatelic library). J.C. Crimlisk, 1959.
- in The Philatelic Journal, July–September 1960.
- Good bibliographic practice: a series of four papers reprinted from the Philatelic Literature Review. State College PA: American Philatelic Research Library, 1971.
- Ifni: stamps and cancellations. The Spanish Philatelic Society, 1974.
- How to identify stamps. London: Stanley Gibbons, 1976. ISBN 0852598602
- Philatelist Index, 1866-1876 and 1934-1974. 1976, 150 pages, cloth, edition of 200.
- Collect British banknotes: a Stanley Gibbons priced catalogue of British Treasury and Bank of England notes. London: Stanley Gibbons, 1977. ISBN 0852599609
- Forgeries of China's "large dragons" 1878. Cinderella Stamp Club, 1978.
- Enjoy stamp collecting. London: Stanley Gibbons, 1987. ISBN 0852591586
- Index to articles on Czechoslovak philately, 1950-1979. Czechoslovak Philatelic Society of Great Britain, 1989.
- The Harris index to philatelic literature 1879-1925: reprint edition of The standard index to philatelic literature 1879-1925 with additional material. Limassol: James Bendon, c. 1991. ISBN 9963762441 (Editor)
- Philatelic literature, compilation techniques and reference sources. Limassol: James Bendon, 1991. ISBN 9963762433
- British stamp design 1993: the work of the Stamp Advisory Committee. London: Royal Mail, 1994. ISBN 0946165033
- Morgan, Glenn H. (1995) British stamp exhibitions: A priced catalogue of sheets, cards, and labels. London: Glenn H. Morgan, 1995. (Foreword) ISBN 0952111705 The book is a catalogue pricing souvenirs Negus studied in the 1980s.
