= Murray Collection =

The Murray Collection is a collection of philatelic material relating to China that forms part of the British Library Philatelic Collections.

The collection includes material from the 1865 Large Dragon issues through to the mid-1950s, with some blocks and covers. It was formed by Engineer Captain J.A. Murray and his son Dr S.E. Murray, and presented to the library in 1980 by Maurice Murray, the grandson of J.A. Murray.

== See also ==
- Postage stamps and postal history of China
