= Revenue stamps of Hong Kong =

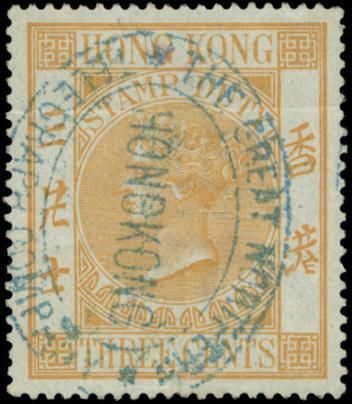
A 3c revenue stamp issued in 1867.

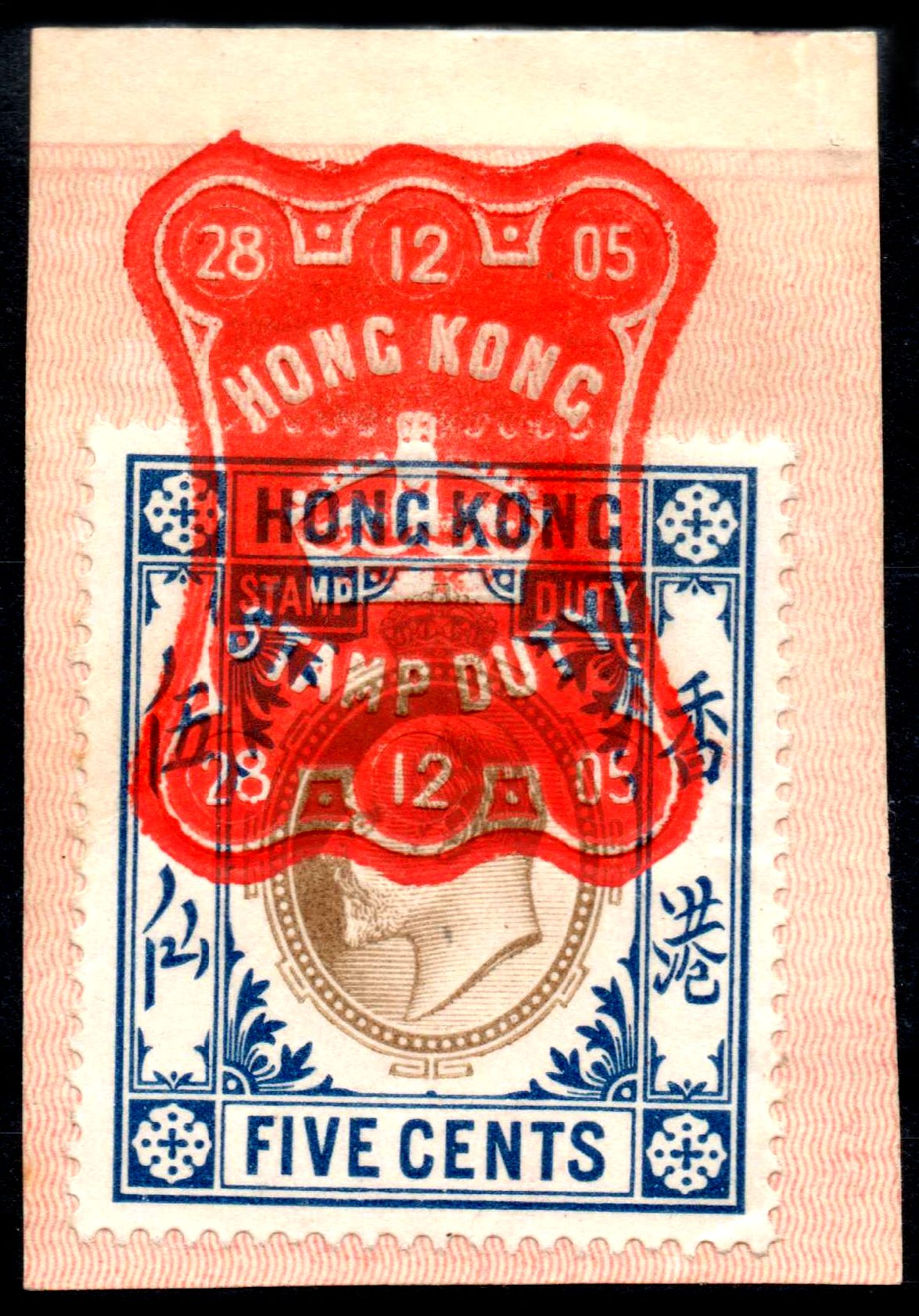
A King Edward VII revenue stamp cancelled with an over-embossing die.

Hong Kong issued revenue stamps from 1867 to the 1990s, both when it was a British colony as well as when it was under Japanese occupation.

== Stamp Duty ==
Hong Kong's first revenues were issued in 1867. A set of nine stamps from 3c to $10 was issued portraying Queen Victoria. In 1873 a 2c value was added in a smaller format, and this is a very rare stamp. In January 1880, a stamp from the 1867 issue was surcharged, and this was valid for both postal and fiscal use. Postage stamps were overprinted S.O. (Stamp Office) or S.D. (Stamp Duty) in 1885 as provisionals when there was a shortage of stamps. The 1867 designs were reissued in new colours in 1885, and this time further values and designs were also added. There were further provisional surcharges up to 1898.

In 1903 a new set was issued showing King Edward VII, who had acceded to the throne following Victoria's death two years earlier. Twenty six values from 1c to $200 were issued, and some are very rare while others are commoner. Some values of this set were reissued in a new watermark in 1907. Ten-cent stamps were surcharged for use as five-cents in 1908 following a shortage of stamps. Later that year a numeral 5c stamp was issued replacing these provisionals.

A new set in a design similar to the 1903 issue but with the portrait of King George V was issued in 1912, with twenty three values from 5c to $200. In 1921, this issue and the 1908 numeral design were reissued on paper with a different watermark. A 10c provisional was issued in 1933.

In 1939, new stamps portraying King George VI were issued. These exist in a number of different watermarks and perforations and continued to be issued until 1951 (with the exception of the Japanese occupation from 1941–45). Provisional surcharges were also issued in 1948 and 1951.

In 1953, a 15c Queen Elizabeth II postage stamp was overprinted STAMP DUTY. This was followed by a new set a year later with ten values from 10c to $20. During Elizabeth's reign, the numeral design of 1908 was again reissued with different sizes, watermarks and papers. The last issue of Hong Kong revenues was in 1980, when a set of thirteen values from $3 to $1200 was issued. These are common and readily available. Two surcharges on this issue were made around 1990.

== Overprints ==
Various stamp duty issues were overprinted for other purposes between the early 20th century and 1978. The first of these were for bills of exchange. Many stamps exist overprinted or handstamped B OF E or BILL OF EXCHANGE in a variety of formats. These continued to be used until they were withdrawn in 1978.

Around 1945, King George V stamp duty issues from the 1920s were overprinted CONTRACT NOTE. These are very rare as limited stocks were available for overprinting. Later various King George VI postage or stamp duty stamps were similarly overprinted. Similar overprints were issued on Queen Elizabeth II revenues in 1956, and these remained in use until the 1970s. Various provisional surcharges were also issued.

Between 1946 and 1948, four postage or stamp duty stamps were also issued overprinted RECEIPT STAMP, or additionally surcharged.

== Japanese occupation ==
On 25 December 1941, British forces in Hong Kong surrendered to Japan following several days of fierce fighting. From 1942, Japanese revenue stamps were used in Hong Kong, and these can only be identified by their cancellations. In 1943 and 1944, Japanese postage or revenue stamps were overprinted for Hong Kong. New designs were also issued printed locally, showing either the HSBC building (then the government headquarters) or Mount Fuji.

== Collecting ==
Hong Kong revenues are popular with collectors from Hong Kong or China. On 6 October 2013 a 1903 1c stamp sold on eBay for $7887. This stamp is very rare as only two recently discovered copies are known, and it was previously thought that this was never issued. It is therefore one of the greatest rarities of British Empire revenue philately.

== See also ==
- Postage stamps and postal history of Hong Kong
- Revenue stamps of China
- Revenue stamps of Weihaiwei
