= Revenue stamps of China =

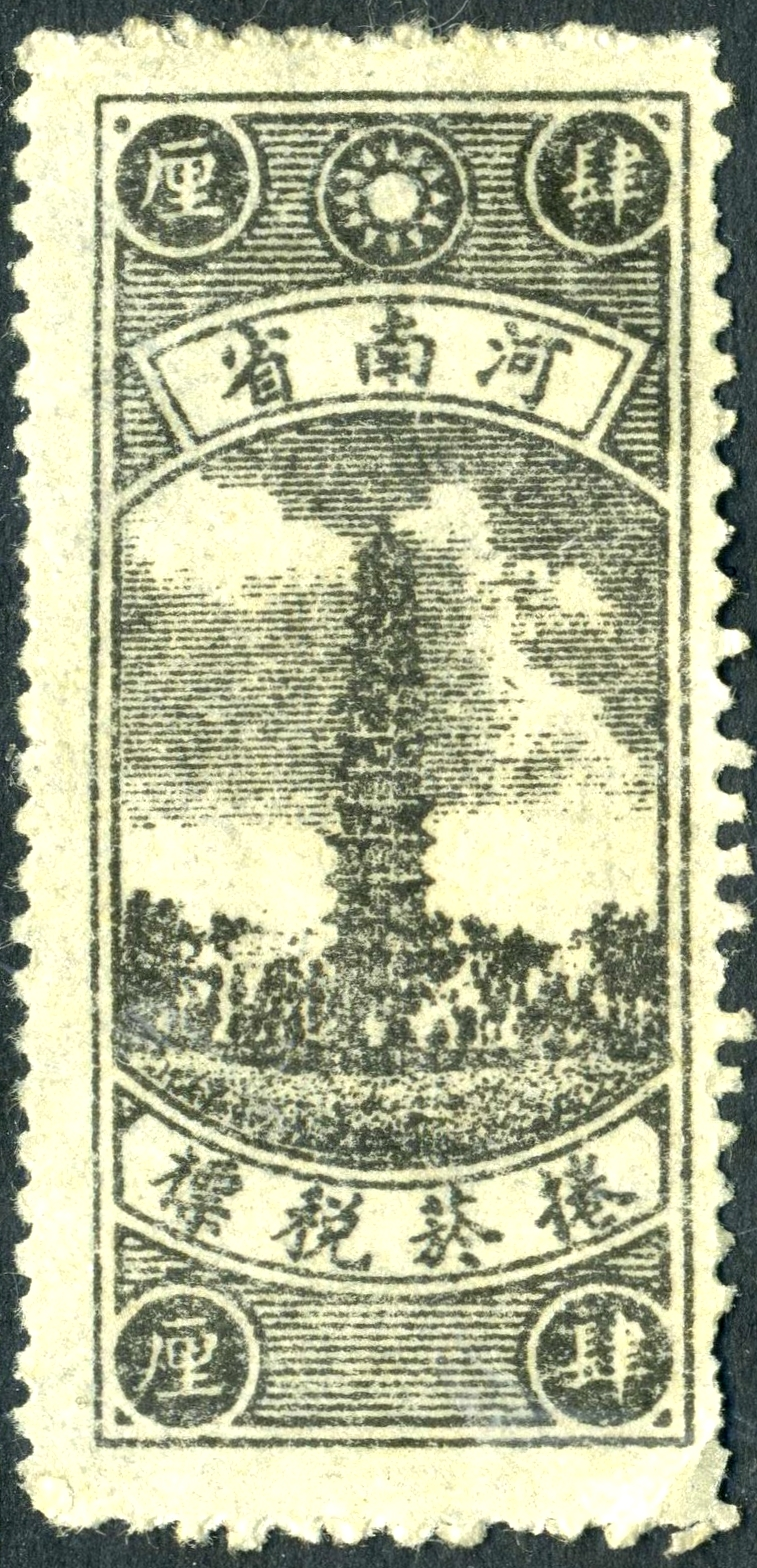
A cigarette tax stamp issued by the Nationalist government of the Republic of China

Revenue stamps of China were first prepared for issue by the Qing dynasty in the late 19th century, but the first revenue stamps which were in general use were issued by the Republic of China after the 1911 revolution. A wide variety of revenue stamps have since been issued, including numerous provincial and local issues.

China's first revenue stamps, the Red Revenues, were ordered by the Chinese Imperial Customs in 1896. Around 600,000 revenue stamps with a denomination of 3¢ were ordered from Waterlow and Sons in London, but they were not issued due to opposition from corrupt customs officials and political leaders. The stamps were stored by the Shanghai Customs Statistical Department, and in 1897 they were overprinted with various new denominations for use as postage stamps.

In 1899, another series of revenue stamps was ordered. It had denominations of 20, 100 and 1000 cash and it was printed by the American Bank Note Company, but once again local opposition prevented the stamps' issue. Another issue consisting of six values (2, 10, 50, 100, 500, and 1000 cash) was authorized by the imperial government in 1907, but provincial governors opposed its issue and the stamps only exist unused.

Following the Xinhai Revolution, some of the unissued stamps from 1899 were issued with "Republic of China" overprints. In 1912, the Republic issued a new series of revenue stamps depicting the Great Wall of China with denominations of 1¢, 2¢, 10¢, 50¢ and $1. This series remained in use until the 1920s, and many printing variations exist. A number of provincial, local and private overprints exist on this issue.

Between 1926 and 1928, the so-called "Wheat series" of revenue stamps was issued, incorporating the name of each province in the design. A series depicting the Chinese flag on a map was issued in 1927. Many overprints exist on these issues as well. In addition, some provinces issued their own designs of revenue stamps. A set of stamps depicting the Liuhe Pagoda was issued between 1934 and 1944.

In 1940, during the Second Sino-Japanese War, the Japanese government issued revenue stamps depicting the Temple of Heaven in Beijing for use in occupied areas. Meanwhile, between 1938 and 1944 the Nationalist government issued stamps depicting H. H. Kung, Chiang Kai-shek, Lin Sen and Sun Yat-sen for use in its territory.

Various other designs of revenue stamps were used throughout the 1940s, including a flag over globe design, stamps depicting the Zhengyangmen and Fu Hsing gates, and stamps showing farming equipment. In 1946, the so-called "Transportation series", depicting various forms of land, sea and air transport, was issued. Various printings of these stamps exist, and they were also overprinted for postal use.

China also issued stamps for specific uses, such as consolidated tax, judicial and commodity taxes. The latter included stamps for taxes on cigarettes, tobacco, alcohol and fuel.

== See also ==
- Revenue stamps of Hong Kong
- Revenue stamps of Weihaiwei
- Postage stamps and postal history of China
