= Revenue stamps of Weihaiwei =

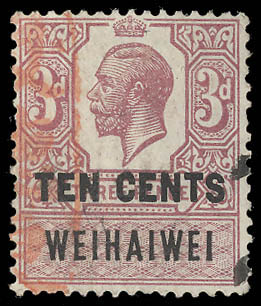
A British revenue stamp overprinted for use in Weihaiwei.

The Leased Territory of Weihaiwei used revenue stamps from 1921 to 1930. The only issue consisted of British King George V keytypes overprinted WEIHAIWEI and a value in cents or dollars. Five values were issued: 1c (on 1d), 2c (on 2d), 10c (on 3d), 50c (on 1s) and $1 (on 1s). The 10c on 3d also exists with additional handstamped surcharges of 1c and 2c. These revenues were withdrawn in 1930 when the leased territory was handed back to China. All of Weihaiwei's revenues are scarce or rare and are highly sought after by collectors.

== See also ==
- Revenue stamps of China
- Revenue stamps of Hong Kong
