= Postage stamps and postal history of China =

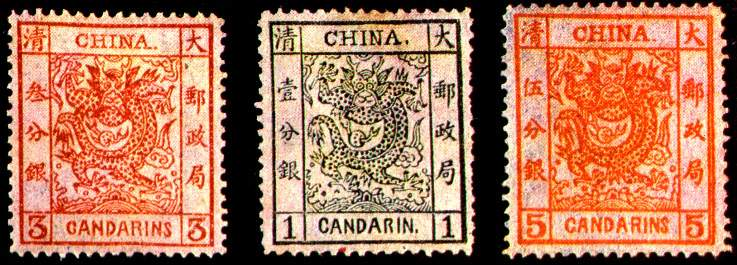
The "Large Dragons", China's first postage stamps, 1878, of the Chinese: 郵政局; pinyin: yóuzhèngjú post office

The history of the postage stamps and postal history of China is complicated by the gradual decay of Imperial China and the years of civil war and Japanese occupation in the 1930s and 1940s. In modern times, postal delivery is handled by China Post.

== Early history ==
Regular government and military postal service is known from the Zhou dynasty (1046-771 BCE). In the Han dynasty (202 BCE-220 CE) and Tang dynasty, postal service handled military communications. During the Song Dynasty, the postal system included delivery levels of foot, horse, and express.

During the Yuan dynasty under Kublai Khan in the 12th century, China was integrated into the much larger Mongolian Örtöö system. Marco Polo reported that there were 10,000 post stages during that time. In addition, private letters were carried by the Min Hsin Chu, a system of letter guilds (hongs). In this period, every prefecture and county had express delivery stations.

The 1727 Treaty of Kyakhta with Russia provided for the first regular exchange of mail.

== Qing dynasty ==
Although postal service in China goes back some 2,500 years, modern postal services were not established until 1877 by the Qing government.

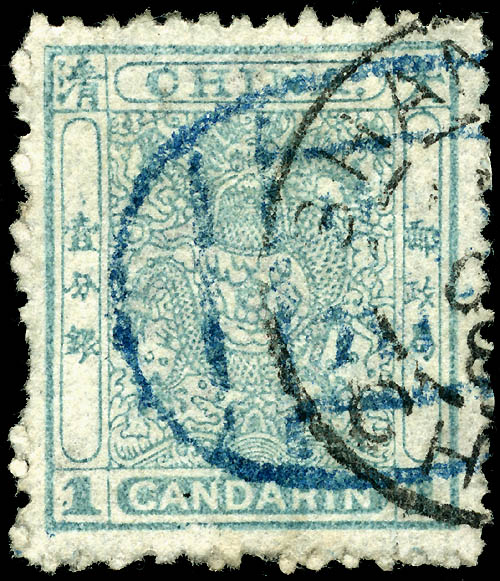
This 1-candareen stamp of 1885 has an unidentified seal cancellation and a postmark from the French post office in Shanghai.

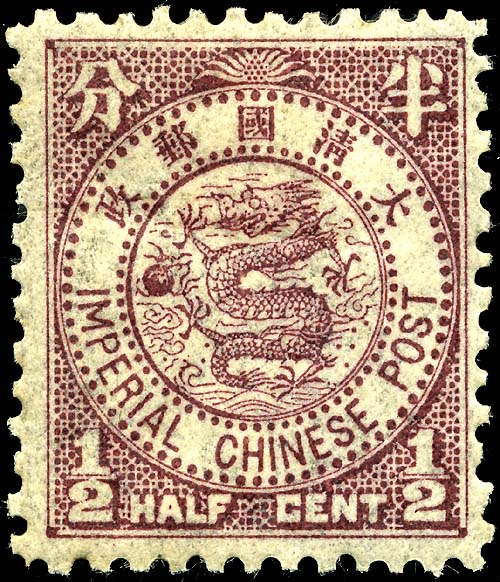
A 1/2-cent value of the 1897 issue, lithographed in Japan. Chinese: 大淸國郵政; pinyin: Dàqīngguó yóuzhèng Great Qing Land Post

A policy of isolation was forcibly ended in the 19th century by the Opium War and the subsequent opening of treaty ports; several nations opened foreign post offices from 1844 on. This expanded to involve dozens of cities, mostly on the coast, along the Yangtze River, and in the far south. Shanghai organized its own Shanghai local post in 1865.

In the same year, the Irishman Robert Hart developed a mail service for the Imperial Maritime Customs, initially to carry consular mail to and from treaty ports. This service was opened to the public on 1 May 1878, and China's first postage stamps, the "Large Dragons" (Chinese: 大龍郵票; pinyin: dà lóng yóupiào), were issued to handle payment. The stamps were inscribed "CHINA" in both Latin and Chinese characters, and denominated in candareens.

Initially, all mail to foreign destinations went through Shanghai, but by 1882 there were twelve post offices. On 20 March 1896, an edict directed that the Customs Post become the Imperial Postal Service effective 1 January 1897; the Min Hsin Chu was shut down, as well as the Shanghai local post, and postal system adopted cents and dollars as the units of currency.

Through the first half of 1897, new stamps were unavailable, and so the existing stock was surcharged in cents, with several variants distinguished by philatelists. Revenue stamps were surcharged as well.

The first new stamps, inscribed IMPERIAL CHINESE POST went on sale 16 August 1897. The twelve values, ranging from 1/2c to $5, were lithographed in Japan. The low values depicted a dragon, the middle values a carp, and the dollar values a wild goose. The paper used for these stamps had a watermark in the form of a yin-yang symbol.

In 1898, these were superseded by similar designs produced by engraving in London, and inscribed CHINESE IMPERIAL POST on a Chinese supplied watermarked paper of varying thickness. The watermark can be difficult to detect on the thicker paper. New printings of the stamp, beginning in 1899 were on unwatermarked paper, but there are no recorded usages of this variety until 1901. These stamps continued in use until the end of the empire. During that time some colors were changed to comply with Universal Postal Union regulations, and three new values were added.

The first commemorative stamps of China were issued in 1909 to mark the 1st year of the reign of the Xuantong Emperor. The set of three (2c, 3c, 7c), all depicted the Temple of Heaven in Beijing.

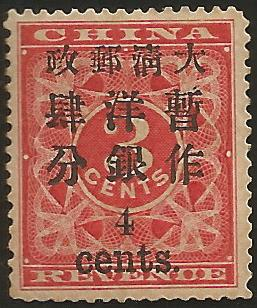
The Red Revenue stamp surcharged in 1897 for postal use

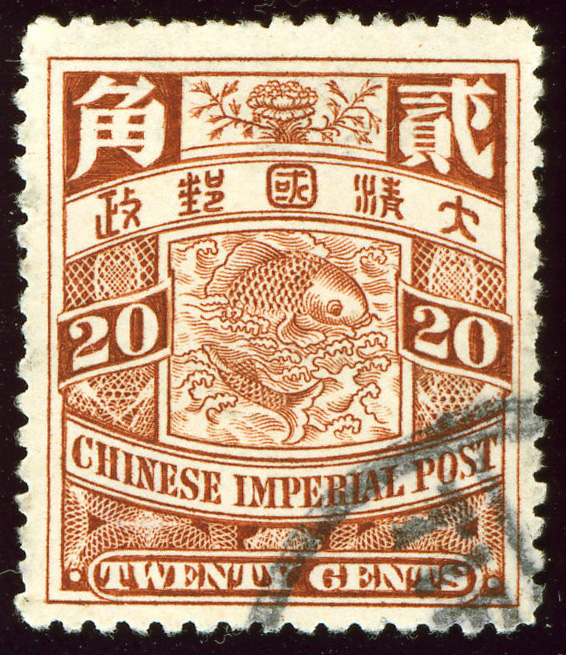
1902 20 cents

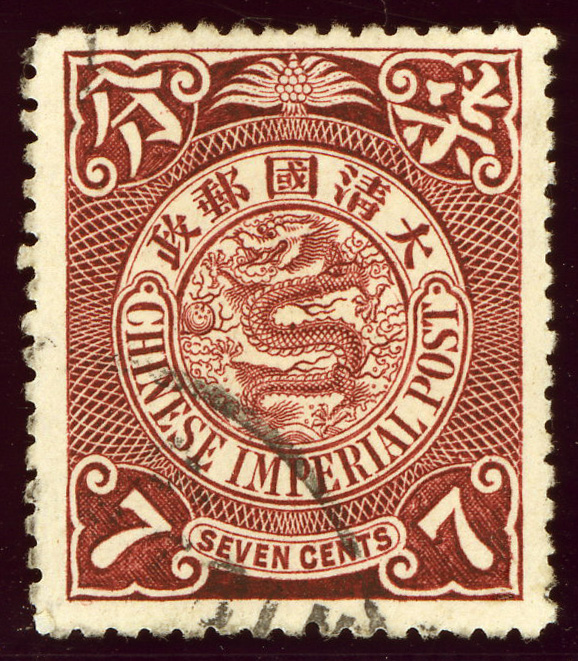
1908 7 cents

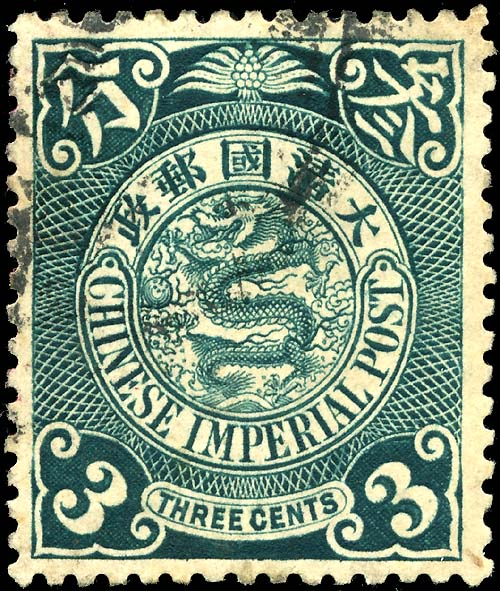
The 3c blue-green was first issued in 1910, one of the last stamps of imperial China

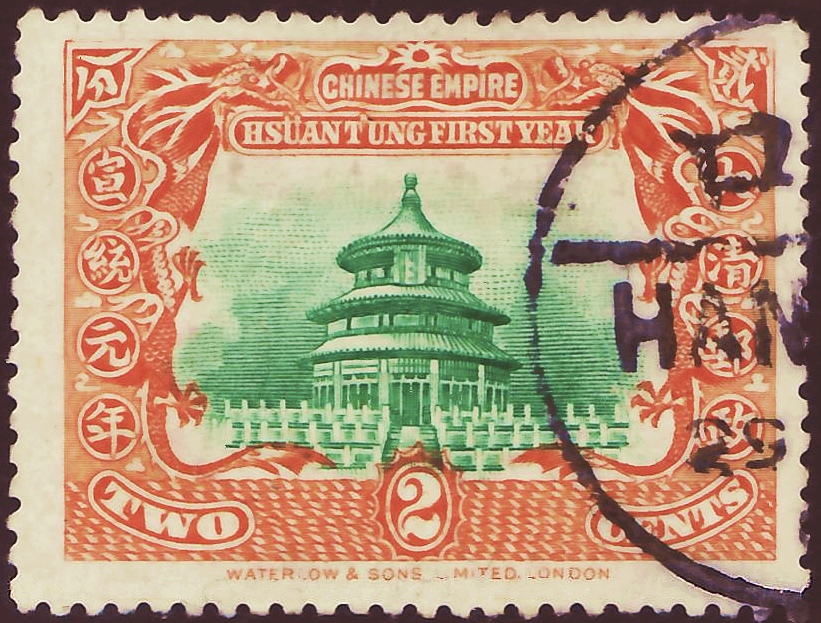
1909 commemorative stamp marking the reign of the Xuantong Emperor

== Republic of China ==
=== Beiyang government ===
The revolution of 1911 resulted in overprints on the imperial stamps in 1912; at Fuzhou to indicate that the post office was effectively a neutral area available to both sides, and at Nanjing and Shanghai reading "Republic of China" (from top to bottom: simplified Chinese: 中华民国; traditional Chinese: 中華民國; pinyin: zhōnghuámínguó). An additional set of overprints was produced by Waterlow and Sons in London, and postmasters throughout the country made their own unofficial overprints using the same characters.

The first new designs of the Republic were two commemorative sets of 12 each, the first set depicting Sun Yat-sen and second Yuan Shikai, both issued on 14 December 1912.

The definitives of the "Junk issue" went on sale 5 May 1913, and continued in use into the 1930s. The low values featured a junk, while values from 15c to 50c showed a farmer reaping rice, while the dollar values depicted the three-part gateway to the Hall of Classics in Beijing. The series was first printed in London, then in Beijing from 1915; they can be distinguished by close examination. The designs were re-engraved in 1923, and a number of design features were changed; for instance, the whitecaps in the water underneath the junk were removed, and the water darkened.

China produced five new commemorative issues, of four stamps each, during the 1920s. The first, issued on 10 October 1921 to commemorate the 25th anniversary of the Chinese Post Office, featured then president Xu Shichang in the center, flanked by Premier Jing Yongbeng and Minister of Communication Ye Gongzuo. On 17 October 1923 a set showing the Temple of Heaven commemorated the new constitution. On 1 March 1928 a set depicting Marshal of the Army and Navy Zhang Zuolin marked his assumption of that role.

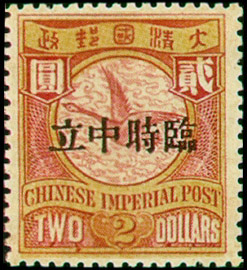
"Chinese Imperial Post" stamp with overprint from right to left: "Provisional Neutrality"

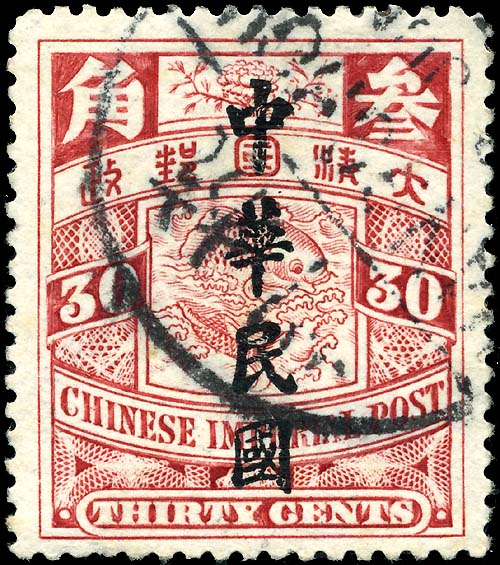
This revolutionary overprint was made in London on a 30c imperial stamp. The overprint reads from top to bottom: "Republic of China"

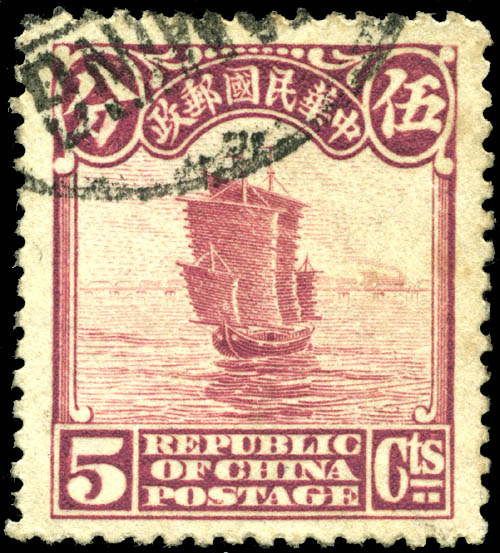
A 1923 definitive stamp featuring a junk

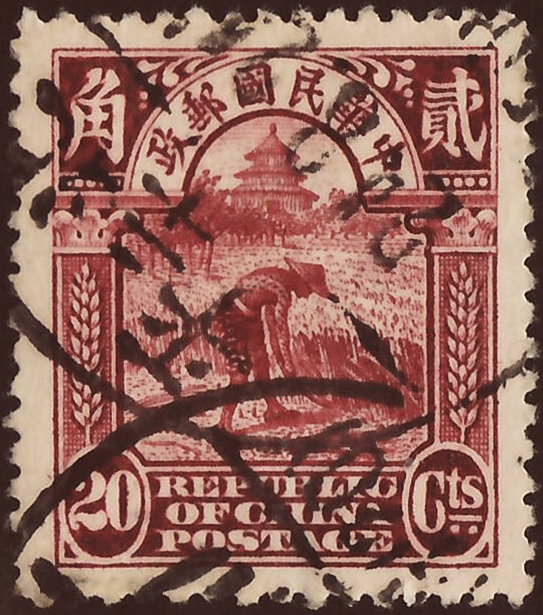
A 1923 definitive stamp showing a reaper on a field before the Temple of Heaven

=== Nationalist government ===
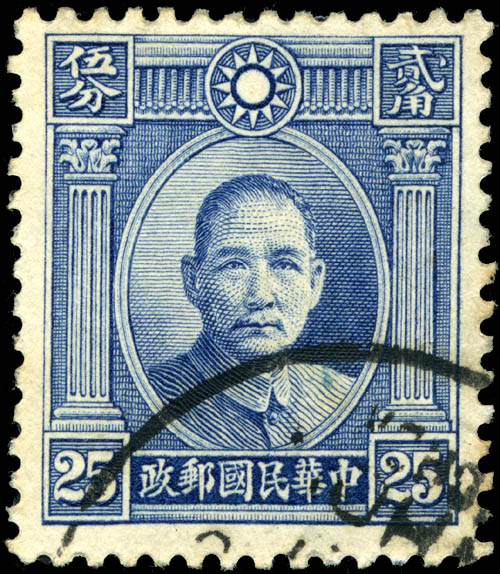
Chinese: 中華民國郵政; pinyin: Zhōnghuá Mínguó Yóuzhèng; lit. 'Post of the Republic of China'; Sun Yat-sen, 25 cents (top right corner 貳角 2 Jiao = 2/10 Yuan + top left corner 伍分 5 Fen = 5/100 Yuan), 1931

On 18 April 1929 Chiang Kai-shek makes a first appearance, commemorating the unification of China. Finally on 30 May 1929, two days before the event, four stamps showing Sun Yat Sen's mausoleum were issued to commemorate his state funeral. New definitives of the so-called Sun Yat-sen stamps were issued in 1931. These stamps, along with the Martyrs issue of 1932 honoring six martyrs of the Kuomintang, would see much overprinting in the next several years.

=== Japanese occupation and wartime ===
During the occupation of several Chinese regions by the Japanese (1937–1945), Chinese stamps were originally in use in the occupied territories. Since 1941, Chinese stamps were overprinted separately for Inner Mongolia, Guangdong, North China, Shanghai and Nanjing. And for some areas, locally designed stamps were issued.

=== Communist posts ===
Communist authorities issued stamps in areas over which they had control from 1930 onwards. These were usually in more remote areas, often on the mountainous borders of two provinces – hence they are often referred to as 'Border Areas'. For example, the earliest communist issues (the so-called 'Red Posts') were in mountainous areas of Jiangxi, the Hunan-Hubei border area and west Fujian, bordering Jiangxi.

=== Post–World War II ===
The end of the conflict brought little respite to the Nationalist government, which continued to struggle with Communist forces. But they were able to issue commemoratives to remember President Lin Sen, who had died in 1943, to mark the October inauguration of Chiang, and to celebrate the Allied victory.

Inflation had been creating a need for ever-higher values throughout 1945, but in 1946 things went out of control; stocks of stamps, some dating back to 1931, were surcharged with values up to $2000, and a new design (still featuring a portrait of Sun Yat-sen) went up to $5000.

1947 saw a number of commemorative issues, and further inflation, a Sun Yat-sen with plum blossoms issue reaching $50,000 that year, then surpassed in 1948 with reissues topping out with a $5,000,000 stamp.

In 1948, a gold yuan standard was adopted, and an assortment of existing stamps were surcharged with values from 1/2c and up. This was a short-lived stopgap, and by early 1949 it became necessary to stamps and overprints with a range of values, again going up to $5,000,000.

On 1 May 1949, the government took a desperate step, which was to print undenominated stamps, sold at the daily rate of the yuan. They then adopted a silver yuan standard, and overprinted still more stamps as well as reissuing the Sun Yat-sen design valued in 1–500 cents. By August, the deteriorating political situation had caught up with the postal system, and the Nationalists' last issues on the mainland were two of a planned series of pictorial designs denominated in silver yuan.

Following the loss of mainland China, Nationalist government stamps were restricted to Taiwan and surrounding islands. Since 2008, stamps are inscribed "Republic of China (Taiwan)".

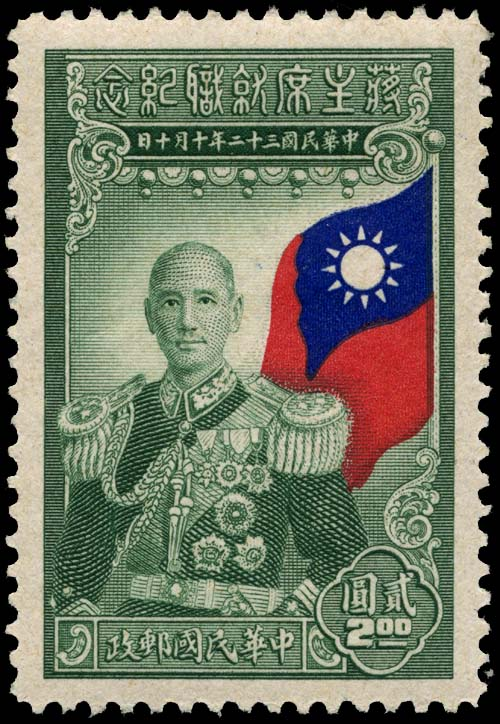
Although not the first appearance of Chiang Kai-shek on a stamp, this October 1945 commemoration of his inauguration includes a broader array of nationalistic symbols.

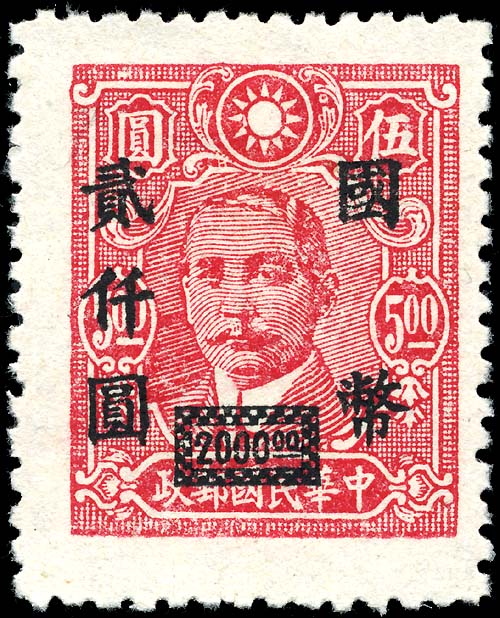
Severe inflation required a steady stream of overprints; this $2000 value is from 1946.

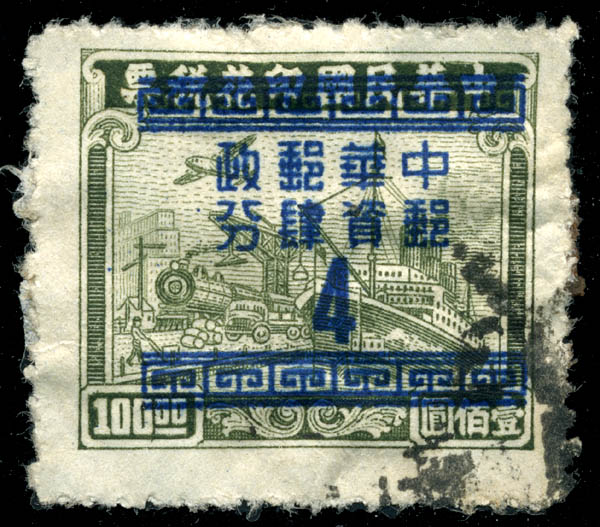
This silver yuan overprint on a revenue stamp was used for only a few months in mid-1949.

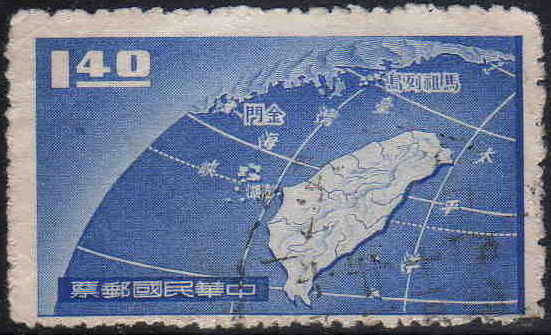
A 1959 stamp of the island of Taiwan

== Manchukuo ==
Japan created a puppet state called Manchukuo out of north-east China in 1932. Although the state ceased to exist after the Second World War, it managed during its lifetime to create many interesting cultural chimeras, including stamps. The designs of Manchukuo stamps show the influence of both countries. In fact, the 1944 Friendship Set was printed in both Chinese and Japanese.

== People's Republic of China ==
The postal system of the People's Republic of China was established as the General Postal Administration in Beijing in 1949, growing out of the posts that had been operating for several years in the communist controlled areas. Development was slow; by 1949 there was only 1 post office for every 370 square kilometers. Several of the communist controlled areas continued to operate their own postal systems; most were ordered to stop selling regional stamp issues by 30 June 1950, while the Northeast Liberation Area and the Port Arthur and Dairen Post and Telegraph Administration continued to use their own stamps (due to the different currencies) until the end of 1950.

=== Postage stamps ===
The unified administration issued its first postage stamps on 8 October 1949, consisting of a set of four depicting a lantern and the Gate of Heavenly Peace, commemorating the 1st session of the Chinese People's Consultative Political Conference. This issue also inaugurated the innovative practice of numbering each type of stamp issued, usually in the lower left corner. For instance, the $800 value in the Dove of Peace issue of 1950 is numbered "5.3-2", indicating that it is the second stamp of three in the fifth stamp issue of China. The practice is only followed for commemorative and special stamps, regular definitive stamps having no special markings.

The first definitive series came in February 1950, and featured the Gate of Heavenly Peace against a background of clouds. The nine values ranged from $200 to $10,000. The design was modified several times over the next year, and again in 1954, resulting in what philatelists call the "second" through "sixth" issues, each varying in minor ways, such as the layout of the clouds.

The postal system found it necessary to surcharge stamps of the previous government, with issues in March and August 1950, and May 1951. In addition, leftover stamps of the Northeastern Provinces were pressed into service in July 1950, and those of East China in December 1950.

In the meantime, various commemoratives marked conferences and other events of the young republic. In June 1952 a set of forty stamps depicting physical exercises was issued in conjunction with a radio program; ten exercises were illustrated, each with a block of four, where each stamp shows a different position of arms and legs for the exercise.

=== Cultural Revolution ===
Reduced stamp sales and withdrawals from issue of several stamps during the Cultural Revolution resulted in a few stamps that are quite scarce, especially used. The typical pattern resulting in rarity was unauthorized sales before the official date of issue by isolated post offices of stamps which were then withdrawn from issue before the official date of issue. One rarity, an unissued 8f stamp from 1967 commemorating the 40th Anniversary of Establishment of Jing Gangshan Revolutionary Base, popularly known as "Big Blue Sky", which pictured Chairman Mao and Lin Biao on the podium overlooking Tiananmen Square exists only as scraps salvaged from the destruction process. Only scraps from one stamp in the withdrawn set are known to exist.

During the Cultural Revolution era, between the year of 1967 and 1971, there were 19 sets total 80 stamps issued by the China Postal Service, with its distinct design and strong political overtone, these stamps became highly collectable after the end of Cultural Revolution.

=== Postal service ===
The postal service was established rapidly in the 1950s and 1960s. By 1952 the principal postal networks centered on the capital, Beijing, and links to all large cities had been established. Great progress was made in improving the postal service under the First Five-Year Plan. Postal service was also developed in the rural areas. Besides extending rural postal routes, the problem of delivering mail to places below the county level was solved by enlisting the aid of the population. From 1954 onward a system of mail delivery by rural postal workers was tried in agricultural cooperatives, and in 1956 this system was extended throughout the country. By 1959 the national postal network was complete.

Postal service was administered by the Ministry of Posts and Telecommunications (now the Ministry of Information Industry), which was established in 1949 and reestablished in 1973 after a two-year period during which the postal and telecommunications functions had been separated and the ministry downgraded to a subministerial level.

In 1984 China had 53,000 post and telecommunications offices and 5 million kilometers of postal routes, including 240,000 kilometers of railroad postal routes, 624,000 kilometers of highway postal routes, and 230,000 kilometers of airmail routes. By 1985 post offices were handling 4.7 billion first-class letters and 25 billion newspapers and periodicals. In 1987, after a six-year hiatus, six-digit postal codes were ordered to be put into use.

For many years, China was not a member of the Universal Postal Union, and while using Arabic numerals for the denominations, did not include the country's name in Latin letters as required of UPU nations. The addition of "CHINA" to stamps' inscriptions began in 1992. Western collectors typically differentiate earlier stamps both by the serial numbers in the lower corner, and by the first character of the country name 中, the "square box with a vertical bar" being visually distinct from the inscription used by any other Asian country.

== See also ==
- China Post, national postal service.
- List of postal codes in China
- Local postal surcharge labels
- China Philatelic Society of London
- China Stamp Society
- Chinese Golden Monkey stamp
- Chinese postal romanization
- Murray Collection
- Postage stamps and postal history of Taiwan
- Postage stamps and postal history of Hong Kong
- Postage stamps and postal history of Macau
- Revenue stamps of China
- Sun Yat-sen stamps
