= P. I. Padget =

Wing Commander Peter Ingram Padget (4 April 1919 – 6 May 2010) was a Royal Air Force officer and philatelist who was a specialist in the stamps of China. He wrote extensive on the subject and his articles appeared in Gibbons Stamp Monthly, the China Clipper, the Journal of Chinese Philately and The London Philatelist.

Padget was born in Alverthorpe, Yorkshire, England. His collection of Wei Hai Wei (Shantung China) was sold by John Bull Auctions in 1990.

== Selected publications ==
- The postal stationery of the People's Republic of China, 1949-65. Batley, Yorkshire: Harry Hayes, 1975. (Originally published in serial form in the Journal of Chinese Philately.)
- The postal markings of China. London: China Philatelic Society of London, 1978.
- The revenue stamps of communist China: 1929-1955. 3rd edition. London: P.I. Padget, 1986.
