= Hong Kong Philatelic Society =

The Hong Kong Philatelic Society
- 香港郵學會
- Formation: 16 June 1921; 105 years ago
- Founded at: British Hong Kong
- Purpose: Philately; Stamp collecting
- Location: Hong Kong
- Chairman: Malcolm Hammersley
- Vice-Chairman: Andrew Cheung (張文德); Daniel Szeto (司徒福添)
- Affiliations: Federation of Inter-Asian Philately (founding member); Federation Internationale Philatelie (member)
- Website: Official website

Hong Kong Philatelic Society
- Traditional Chinese: 香港郵學會
Transcriptions
Yue: Cantonese
- Yale Romanization: Hēung góng yàuh hohk wúi
- Jyutping: Hoeng1 gong2 jau4 hok6 wui2

The Hong Kong Philatelic Society was established on 16 June 1921 and is the oldest philatelic organisation in Hong Kong. Members were mainly Europeans before the war and after 1946, more and more Chinese became members and the Society has grown in stature. Currently, the Society has over 350 local and overseas members.

== History ==
Formed to promote philatelic activities in Hong Kong, the Society once contributed a column in the South China Morning Post in the 1930s reporting on both local and foreign philatelic activities and developments. In the 1960s, it began holding open competitive exhibitions locally and published a monthly newsletter.

== Journal ==
The first annual journal of the Hong Kong Philatelic Society was inaugurated in 1997 and No. 20 was published in 2016 under the editorship of its Chairman Dr. Andrew Cheung FRPSL, AIEP. A change of editorship occurred after 2016 and the current editor is Prof. P.C. Shaw. HKPS J28 will be published in March 2024. Previous issues of the HKPS Journals have won multiple philatelic literature awards including national stamp exhibition Gold in New Zealand, FIAP, FIP Large Vermeil medal as well as Christoph Gartner award.

== Website ==
The official website has been upgraded recently thanks to the current editor and now most of the previous newsletters and all Journals can be downloaded. The website has also search function.

== Meetings ==
Members meet monthly at the City Hall for philatelic seminars and philatelic displays. Zoom meetings sponsored by FIAP are being held monthly and can be seen on Youtube (search hong kong philatelic society), these have become popular among overseas members who cannot come to the monthly meeting.

== Affiliations ==
The Society was one of the founding members of the Federation of Inter-Asian Philately (FIAP) and has been a member of the Federation Internationale de Philatelie (FIP) since the 1980s. We are also one of the recognised philatelic organisations by Hongkongpost

== Participation in exhibitions ==
Over the years, the Society has promoted philately vigorously in Hong Kong and organised the first national stamp exhibition in 1994, the first international stamp exhibition in February 1997 and the 15th FIAP Asian International in February 2001. In addition, the Hong Kong Philatelic Society has also organised national exhibitions such as Hongpex'96, Hongpex'98, Hongpex'00, Hong Kong Stampex 2002, 2003, 2005 and 2006 so that new exhibits formed by local collectors can qualify for future FIAP & FIP exhibitions. The Christopher D'Almada trophy is to be awarded as the grand prize for the Hongpex exhibitions. In December 2002, the Society together with the Hong Kong Study Circle (UK) organised the 140th Anniversary of Hong Kong Stamps Exhibition at the City Hall. In addition, the HKPS also participated in joint stamp exhibitions such as in Guangzhou, Macau and the most recent Hong Kong-Macau Joint Stamp Expo in October 2005. In January 2004, the Society co-organised the Hong Kong 2004 Stamp Expo - 17th Asian International Philatelic Exhibition which was another success. Two more FIAP Asian International Stamp exhibitions were organised by the Society supported by Hong Kong Post, namely HONG KONG 2009 and HONG KONG 2015. Today, the Society is actively involved in raising local standard of exhibiting among adult and youth alike. Members of the Society have achieved Large Gold and Gold medals, Grand Prix Awards and World Stamp Champion at international stamp exhibitions.

== See also ==
- Hong Kong Study Circle
- Postage stamps and postal history of Hong Kong
