= Sun Yat-sen stamps =

Stamps depicting Chinese statesman Sun Yat-sen

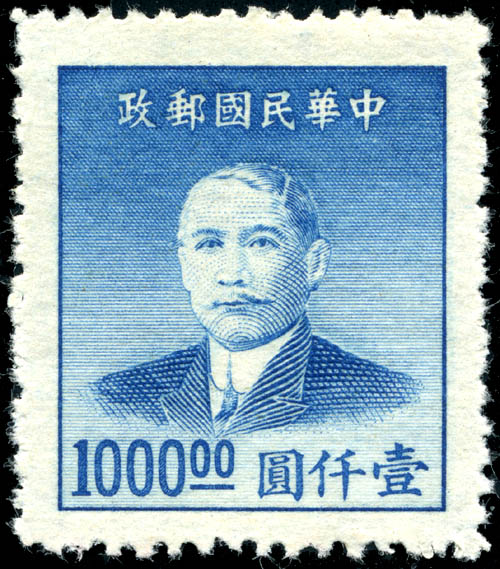
A 1949 stamp depicting Sun Yat-sen (definitive twelfth issue).

Numerous Chinese stamps depict Sun Yat-sen, and a representative collection can be acquired with little trouble. These may conveniently be divided as the definitives, provincial issues, overprints, and commemoratives, but there is much crossover between these categories.

== Definitives ==
The material below recognizes 12 definitive issues of Sun Yat-sen stamps produced by China during the 1930s and 1940s. The Stanley Gibbons Catalogue lists fourteen separate issues, but list the regional issues as additional. Other catalogues, such as Chan, may count reused designs or the printings by different printers as constituting separate designs. Because of the complexity involved with these stamps the organization below of these issues is motivated by making the identification of these issues as simple as possible for people who are not yet familiar with these stamps. Chan recognises 26 separate Sun Yat-sen definitive issues up to 1949, including provincial issues, and is perhaps the most logical and rigorous of the China stamp catalogues in this area.

=== First issue ===
The first Sun Yat-sen definitives were issued in 1931, and were recess printed by De La Rue & Co. of London. In this issue the portrait of Sun Yet-sen is flanked by Corinthian columns. It only exists in the 1¢, 2¢, 4¢, 20¢, $1.00, $2.00 and $5.00 face values on unwatermarked paper, perforated 12½ by 13. The three high values are bi-coloured. Because the ring inside the sun emblem appears as two rings this is commonly known as the "Double Circle Issue". The double circle was an error, but existing stocks were allowed to be used. Because it was soon replaced fewer legitimate overprint varieties exist on this issue than on the succeeding issue.

=== Second issue ===
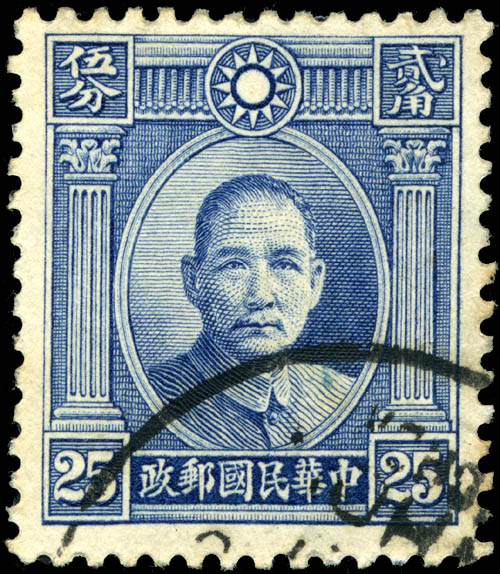
1931 second issue

The second issue of Sun Yat-sen definitives was also first issued in 1931, and corrected the inner ring in the sun symbol to a single solid circle. The 1¢ value was not issued in this design, but all the other values in the first issue were reprinted in the same colours. Additional values of 5¢, 15¢ in two colour varieties, and 25¢ were also added. In 1946 the same design was used for monochrome $1.00, $2.00, $20.00, $30.00 and $50.00 values necessitated by inflation. There are numerous overprints on the single circle stamp, and there are several plate varieties of the stamps with the lower face values.

For those unfamiliar with the portrait of Dr. Sun, the Martyrs issue of 1932 also has Corinthian columns on either side of the portrait, but the portrait itself is framed by a wreath rather than a double line oval, as with the Sun Yat-sen stamps.

=== Third issue ===
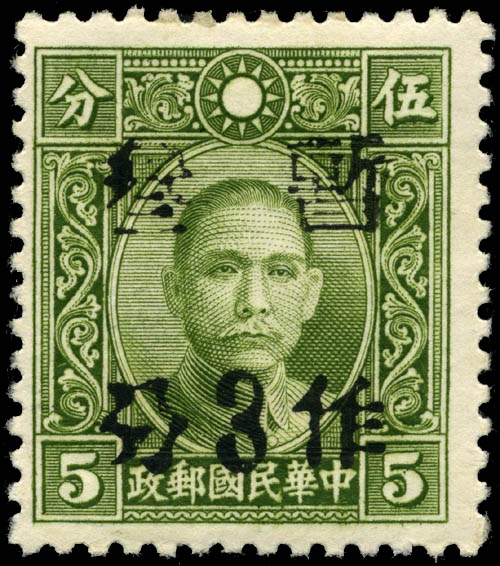
Overprinted third issue

The third issue became necessary when the fall of Beijing to the Japanese in July 1937 resulted in having printing plates that were behind enemy lines. A new design was required, and it is most easily recognized by the replacement of the Corinthian columns in the side panels with floral scrollwork. The new stamps, first released on 1938-11-11 were printed by the Chung Hwa Book Co., the Dah Tung Book Co. and the Commercial Press, all of Hong Kong. Certain high values were later printed by the Pacheng Printing Co. of Nanping in Fujian Province; these were first released in 1942. This issue continued in use through most of the tumult of the following decade. The resulting varieties in printing methods, design details, secret marks, watermarks and perforations, as well as overprints for regional, occupation and revalued uses make the study of this issue the most complex of the Sun Yat-sen issues. The $5.00 stamp is often found imperf but they were never issued in that format. Such copies were looted from the printing works in Hong Kong during the war.

=== Fourth issue ===
The fourth issue, also known as the "New York print", was recess printed and perforated 12 by the American Banknote Company and appeared on 1941-02-21. The colours in this issue tend to be brighter than in the others. In this issue Sun's picture, which faces slightly to the right, is on a largely unshaded background, and the Western value tablets have been moved to the middle of both sides of the stamp. Sixteen values between ½¢ and $20.00 form this set. One of the rarest and most spectacular varieties in Chinese stamps is the $2 that was printed with the portrait upside down in the frame. It is believed only one sheet was printed like this and only a few stamps from it have turned up. Apart from this, there are no major varieties of this issue, but there are numerous significant overprints.

=== Fifth issue ===
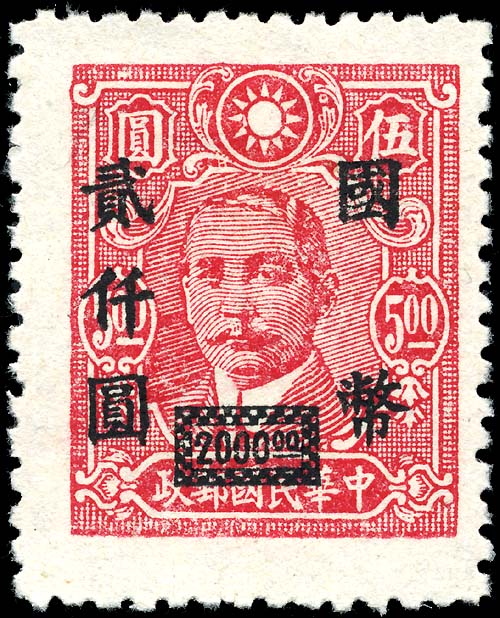
Overprinted fifth issue

The fifth issue continues many of the design elements of the fourth, but has a much cruder appearance. The portrait of Dr. Sun in this issue is a full bust and faces to the left; the entire background for the portrait is shaded. The issue, known as the Central Trust Print, was made necessary when Hong Kong fell to the Japanese in December 1941. The first stamp in this issue appeared on 1942-09-15. The stamp was printed in the wartime capital of Chongqing, as well as by the Pacheng Printing Co. of Nanping. There are several varieties of this issue based on paper, secret marks and perforation, as well as a large number of overprints.

=== Sixth issue ===
The sixth issue is characterized by a larger portrait of Dr. Sun in a double frame with a square-toothed line between the frames, lens forms in the side panels, and Arabic numeral tablets on banners in the lower corners. It was first produced on native paper by the Chung Hwa Book Co. of Chongqing in 1944, and includes nine values. A number of overprints exist.

=== Seventh issue ===
The seventh issue shows Sun Yat-sen in an oval frame with wavy lines as side ornaments. The stamps appeared in 1945, and were typographed by the Dah Tung Book Co. Printing Works in Chongqing. The combination of poor quality paper, ink, equipment and workmanship resulted in a wide range of unintended varieties, most of which are ignored by philatelists. The set appears with four face values: $2.00, $5.00, $10.00 and $20.00 perforated 12½. Several overprints also exist.

=== Eighth issue ===
The eighth issue is easily recognized since it is the only issue in which the tablet containing the Arabic numeral value is centred at the bottom of the stamp. Appearing in December 1945, this is the first of these Sun Yat-sen issues to be produced after the Japanese surrender when the two Chinese factions could abandon their uneasy alliance and get back to the business of fighting each other. This series was produced by Chongqing's Central Trust Bureau Printing Works, which was now renamed the Central Engraving and Printing Works. The series was typographed on white wood free paper. The printing still has a crude appearance and the perforations with small holes are often rough. The six values in this set, $20.00, $30.00, $40.00, $50.00, $100.00 and $200.00 reflect the growing inflationary problems of the time. A number of overprinted issues were also produced

=== Ninth issue ===
The ninth issue was recess printed by the Dah Tung Printing Works in Shanghai where better facilities were available; this is reflected in the improved general appearance of the stamps. This issue, whose release began 1946-07-23. Stamps in this set can be recognized by the somewhat water-drop shape of the Arabic value tablets in the bottom corners of the stamps. These stamps were perforated 14, and issued without gum; nevertheless different papers and printing conditions give rise to several varieties. The eleven values in this set range from $20.00 to $5000.00. The usual range of surcharges exists.

=== Tenth issue ===
The tenth issue was once again printed in London by the De La Rue Co. It was released in May 1947, and is identified by the torches on either side of the portrait. Only four stamps are in this set. The lowest value, the $500.00 olive green is monocoloured, the other three ($1,000.00, $2,000.00 and $5,000.00) are bi-coloured. All the values have perforation varieties. The only overprint on this issue is the 2 silver cents on $500.00 for West Sichuan produced in 1949. It has four recognized varieties.

=== Eleventh issue ===
The eleventh issue is known as the "Plum Blossom" issue, and was also engraved and produced by the Dah Tung Book Co. in Shanghai. In this set the Arabic value is at the lower left of the stamp, the Chinese value tablet is vertically oriented in the upper right corner of the stamp, and the plum blossoms are drawn below the Chinese value tablet. Their release began on 1947-10-17. The stamps are perforated 14, and were issued without gum. Because different papers were used there are paper and size varieties for most stamps in this issue. There are numerous overprints on this stamp to reflect the currency revaluations that began in 1948

The issue may be divided into two groups. In the first group the 17 values are printed with cents and range from $150.00 to $500,000.00. There are two types of the $500.00 stamp. A further three values, $100.00, $350.00 and $700.00 were printed but not issued without overprints.

The second group with 12 values began being issued on 1948-07-23 at the peak of the inflationary period. The values range from $20,000 to $5,000,000 with the cents omitted. The Gibbons catalogue treats this second issue as the Twelfth Issue. The twelfth issue below is then treated as the thirteenth.

=== Twelfth issue ===
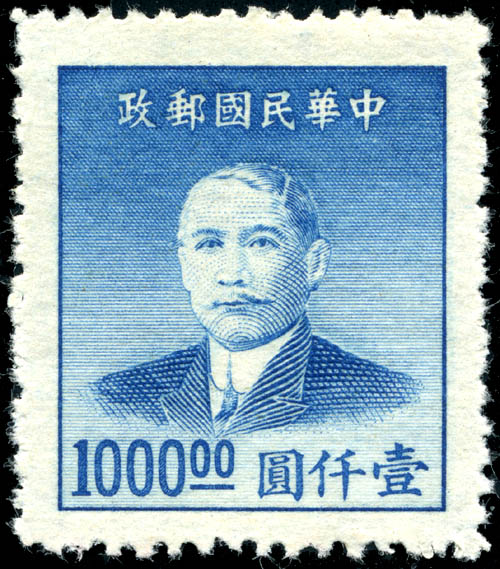
Twelfth issue

The twelfth issue is very easily recognized because it is the only one in which Sun's portrait appears on a plain background.

On 1948-08-20 the Gold Yuan replaced the Chinese National Currency at the rate of 1 Gold Yuan for 3,000,000 CNC dollars. This gave rise to a confusing number of overprinted stamps of the previous issues. By the time the new stamps appeared on the first day of 1949 inflation was still rampant, and three versions of this stamp were soon produced in Shanghai. The stamps engraved by the Dah Tung Co. came in nine values from $1.00 to $1000.00. This was followed by a $10.00 and a $20.00 engraved value from Central Trust. Since lithographed stamps could be produced more quickly, a set of 12 lithographed stamps from the Dah Tung Co. with values from $50.00 to $100,000 soon appeared, as did a fourth lithographed product from the Hwa Nan Printing Press of Chongqing with eight values from $50.00 to $500,000.

In April 1949 The Gold Yuan in turn collapsed and was replaced by the Silver Yuan. This resulted in a new lithographed printing from the Hwa Nan Press in Chongqing with nine values from 1 cent to 500 cents. This set was the last Sun Yat-sen stamp issued before the division of China. The Gibbons catalogue treats this second issue as the fourteenth Issue.

== Provincial Issues ==
In addition to the national issues and the wide range of overprints two additional original issues were produced with limited regional validity.

=== Northeastern Provinces ===
An issue of five stamps was made in February 1946. They are similar to the third issue except that the area around the head is unshaded and they were litho printed. In addition the stamps are overprinted with new values and characters which mean 'limited for use in the North East'. Normally such stamps would be classed in the overprinted issues but as the non-overprinted stamps were never issued these stamps may be treated as a separate issue. The stamps are mono-coloured and have values of 50c, 50c, $1.00, $2.00, $4.00.

A new issue was produced for the North Eastern Provinces (mostly the former puppet republic of Manchukuo) by the Central Printing Works in Beijing in July 1946. This issued may be easily recognized by the column of small circles in the side panels. The stamps were engraved, perforated 14, and issued without gum. It was issued in two printings. The first included fourteen values from 5 cents to $50.00.

The second printing in June 1947 was required because of inflation, and had ten values between $4.00 and $1,000.00. The $4.00, $10.00, $20.00 and $50.00 stamps exist in both printings, and may be distinguished by examining the details of the character "國". Several overprints exist. Three additional values in the second printing ($22.00, $65.00 and $109.00) were produced, but not regularly issued without overprints

=== Taiwan ===
Taiwan was under Japanese occupation from 1895 until 1945-10-25 when control was surrendered to China. Until a change could be made in 1948, Taiwan continued to use a currency based on that of Japan. Thus, the new stamps introduced on 1947-07-10 were denominated in yen even though that is not apparent from the face of the stamp. This "Taiwan Farm Products" issue has the Arabic value tablet in the lower right of the stamp and the Chinese value tablet in the upper left. Both printings of this set were engraved by the Dah Tung Book Co. of Shanghai, perforated 14, and issued without gum.

The first printing included 10 values from 1.00 yen to 200.00 yen, and show the zeros for sen. The issue includes wide and narrow varieties. A 30 sen and 7.50 yen value were printed, but only used for overprints. A 70 sen and 1.50 yen value were printed but never used at all.

The second printing had values more in conformity with the Chinese currency of the time which was facing its own inflation problems. The five values in this printing were for $25, $5,000, $10,000, $20,000, $30,000 and $40,000. All were printed without the zeros for cents. Overprints exist for values in both printings.

== Overprinted Issues ==
These issues are a vast and confusing field. The changing political situation in China as well as currency alterations during the time in question resulted in numerous overprints of the basic issues. Despite all the unrest the mail system continued to function and it seemed that the postal authorities used whatever was available to produce stamps for use. Most of the definitive issues were overprinted at some time or other either to change the value (surcharge), or the use, (e.g. postage due) or both.

The Japanese occupation of large parts of China during the war resulted in a great number of overprints and surcharges, mostly for use within a limited region. A number of these stamps received further overprints when the territory was recaptured from the Japanese.

The Nationalists also produced overprints limiting the use of some stamps to particular provinces. This was to prevent trafficking in stamps during times of currency disruptions. As the Communists liberated various parts of the country they too overprinted available stamps including the Sun Yat-sen issues under regional authorities, and they did not begin issuing stamps for the entire country until they had consolidated power.

Another large group of overprints occurred after the war when the Chinese National Currency was introduced. This currency devalued rapidly, as did the Gold Yuan which replaced it. This led to two series "revaluation" surcharges in the post-war era. These were done by a number of different printers in various cities resulting in a variety of styles, fonts, and colours in the overprints.

A few overprints were used to create commemoratives; these include the 1941 issue for the 30th Anniversary of the Republic, and the 1943 North China Japanese occupation issues to commemorate the Return to China of Foreign Concessions.

== Commemorative Issues ==
Sun Yat-sen has been highly revered by all political sides for having ended the old dynasty system of China. Commemoratives celebrating Sun were thus issued both before and after 1949, and by both the Republic of China and the People's Republic of China.

=== The Republic before 1950 ===
The first issue featuring Sun Yat-sen was the 1912-12-15 issue commemorating the revolution. There are twelve values in the set which was recess printed in Beijing perforated 14½. This set should not be confused with a very similar concurrent set depicting Yuan Shih-kai.

The next issue to appear on 1929-05-30 marked the State Burial of Sun Yat-sen and depicts the memorial hall of his mausoleum. This structure which was commenced after Sun's death in 1925 is built on the side of a hill near Nanjing. The four stamps in this set were engraved and printed in Beijing, perforated 14. Overprints of this set were produced for use in Xinjiang, Yunnan and Manchuria.

On 1944-12-25 a set of five stamps was released for the 50th Anniversary of the founding in Hawaii on 1894-11-11 of Xingzhonghui (興中會), or Revive China Society, predecessor of the Kuomintang (Chinese Nationalist Party). The stamp was lithographed with rubber plates by the Central Trust Bureau in Chongqing, and issued without gum.

The following year on 1945-03-12 a set of six marked the 20th anniversary of Sun's death. This too was lithographed with a rubber plate at Chongqing, and issued without gum.

In September 1946 a blue airmail stamp of $27 was issued. It showed an aircraft over the mausoleum of Dr Sun in Nanking. It was reissued in 1948 but with a $10,000 overprint.

On 1947-05-05 a set commemorating the 1st Anniversary of the Return of Government to Nanjing depicts the gateway to the Sun's mausoleum. The five values of this set were printed in Beijing by the Central Trust printing works. The engraved stamps were perforated 14. Separate versions of this set were also released with different values for use in the Northeastern Provinces and Taiwan.

On 1948-04-28 a set of two stamps was produced by the Central Engraving and Printing Works in Beijing to mark the third anniversary of the restoration of Taiwan to Chinese rule. It shows the Sun Yat-sen Memorial Building in Taipei. It was engraved and perforated 14.

Finally, on 1948-03-20, on Postal Commemoration Day, a large format $5,000.00 dark carmine commemorative was issued which included an illustration of the 10 cents Sun-Yat-sen stamp of the 1912 issue. It was lithographed with rubber plates by the Dah Yeh Printing Co. of Shanghai, and available both perforated 14 and imperforate. It was issued at a stamp exhibition in Nanjing, and honoured the 70th anniversary of the first Chinese stamp in 1878. An otherwise identical stamp, both perforated 14 and imperforate, was issued on 1948-05-19 in green for a philatelic exhibition in Shanghai.

=== People's Republic of China ===
Commemoratives from the People's Republic of China include:

- 1956 90th Anniversary of Yat-sen's birth,
- 1961 50th Anniversary of the Republic,
- 1981 70th Anniversary of the Founding of the Republic
- 1986 75th Anniversary of the Founding of the Republic
- 1999 Review of the 20th Century set; one 60f value only, 1911 Revolution
- 2006 140th Anniversary of Yat-sen's birth, plus separate issue for Hong Kong.
- 2016 150th Anniversary of Yat-sen's birth, plus separate issues for Hong Kong and Macau.

=== Republic of China ===
The Republic of China has produced the following additional stamps commemorating Sun Yat-sen:

- 1955 2nd Re election of Chiang Kai-shek which shows the Sun Yat-sen memorial building,
- 1959 the 150th Anniversary of Lincoln's birth,
- 1961 50th National Day,
- 1964 70th anniversary of Kuomintang,
- 1965 Centenary of Yat-sen's birth,
- 1971 60th National Day
- 1975 50th Anniversary of Yat-sen's death,
- 1976 11th Kuomintang Conference and others in later years along similar lines.
- 1994 Centenary of the Kuomintang.
- the Sun Yat-sen memorial building has also appeared on stamps in 1955, 1968 and 1971.
- 2016 150th Anniversary of Yat-sen's birth.

== Other countries ==
Countries other than China have also issued stamps depicting Sun Yat-sen. These include the following countries:

- Argentina, 1966 Birth centenary
- Guyana 1997, 75th Anniversary of Death
- Macau, 120th Anniversary of Birth.
- Marshall Islands, 2000 Miniature sheet
- Mongolia, 1993 Miniature sheet for Taipei 1993
- Nevis, 2005 Miniature sheet
- Papua New Guinea, 1996 Miniature sheet
- Philippines, 2016, 150th Anniversary of birth
- Romania. Birth centenary
- Saint Vincent and the Grenadines, 1994 Miniature sheet
- Tanzania, 1997 Miniature sheet
- United States
  1942, Chinese resistance
  1961, Fifty years of the Republic of China
- USSR
  1965 Birth centenary
  1986 120th Anniversary of Birth
- Venda (South Africa), 1988 Writing set. The 16c value has calligraphy by Dr Sun Yat-sen that means "universal love."

== Revenue Stamps ==
He has also appeared on a number of Chinese revenue or fiscal stamps. These were issued before 1949. For example, there is the green 1943 Postal Savings of $1.00. It has characters the mean "Save Money for China." In addition some of the regular postal issues above were overprinted for fiscal or tax use.

see http://www.chinarevenuestamps.com/

Revenue Stamps – Taiwan

1946 Central portrait of Dr Sun in oval frame. Characters above and below. Scroll work on either side of portrait. Western numeral of value in bottom left and right corner. Stamps are wider than they are tall. Issued imperf but with a cutting line and no gum. Values: 10c, 20c, 40c, $1, $2, $4, $10, $50, $100, $500, $1000. The $10 and the three highest values exist in two printings of different colours.

1948 Portrait of Dr Sun in oval frame on the lower right of the stamp. A map of Taiwan Province is central and on the left is a palm. At the top is the round star symbol of the Government the same as on the first issue of postage stamps above. Characters in top right corner in two lines. Stamps are wider than they are tall, no gum. Litho printed values; $10, $50. Engraved printed values: $50, $100, $500, $1000, $5000.

1949 July. New Currency. The 1948 stamps were reissued but with an overprint. Values: 25c, $2.50.

1949 November. Issue of a similar design to the 1948 issue but with the value block lower down. Lithographed, rouletted, no gum. Values: 1c, 5c, 10c, 50c, $1, $5, $10, $20, $50.

1952 (Republic of China). Portrait of Dr Sun in oval frame on the centre left of the stamp. View of Chung-shan Bridge (SYS Bridge) on right. Lithographed, rouletted, no gum. Stamps are wider than they are tall. Values: 1c, 5c, 10c, 50c.

Reference; "Revenue Stamps of Taiwan Area Republic of China" by Sheau Horng Wu. 1981, ROC.

== See also ==
- Postage stamps and postal history of China
