= Hong Kong Children's Stamps =

The first collection of Hong Kong's Children Stamps named The Ingenuous Artists was issued on 18 November 2001 which is the debut of the Hong Kong's stamp development history. According to the Hongkong Post, It aims at encouraging children to develop a themed stamp collecting hobby. There is Inter-School Stamp Exhibits Competition organised by the Hongkong Post to invite children who are 12 years old or below to create stamps for the latest children stamps collection. The award winners’ designs are issued in mint collection. By giving opportunity for children to create stamps, it can attract children to know more about stamps. Children stamps are in mint collection which include a wide variety of themes ranging from Chinese and foreign folklore to pets.

== Collection ==
Children Stamps - My Favourite Toys and Games Issue Date: 7 April 2004

"Children Stamps - Andersen's Fairy Tales" Special Stamps Issue Date: 22 March 2005

Children Stamps - Paper Folding Fun Issue Date: 22 May 2008

"Children Stamps - Hong Kong in My Eyes" Issue Date: 21 October 2010

"Children Stamps - Chinese Idioms and Their Stories" Issue Date: 28 June 2011

== Theme ==
The themes of the stamps are wide-ranging. The children's stamp represents the culture of Hong Kong. By introducing the children's stamp, it shares the unique historical culture, society norms with the world.

=== Childhood ===
The theme of children's stamp is closely related to childhood. The"My Favourite Toys and Games" and "Paper Folding Fun" collections merge the toys or games and paper folding with the stamps. These children toys and games, as well as, paper folding, are the main entertainment for children. Children can feel related to their lives.

=== Chinese culture ===
The children's stamp aims at promoting Chinese culture among children. The "Chinese Idioms and Their Stories" collections encourage children to design stamps that are related to some Chinese idioms and stories. This provides a chance for the children to foster their interest in knowing more about Chinese culture and have more knowledge about Chinese culture.

=== Fairy tale ===
The children's stamp boosts children's creativity and imagination. The "Hans Christian Andersen's Fairy Tales" Special Stamps incorporates the well known fairy tale stories with the stamp design.

=== Hong Kong culture ===
The children's stamp aims at fostering the sense of belonging and increasing children's knowledge about their community. The "Hong Kong in My Eyes" collection allows children to show us how they perceive their home - Hong Kong from their own creative perspectives.

== Design ==
=== 2004 Children Stamps - My Favourite Toys and Games ===
Designer:
Choi- Ka Lai($1.40)
Chan- Hoi Yan ($2.40)
Yuen- Nga Pui ($3)
Liu- Zaap Yin($5)
Printer: Joh Enshede Stamps Security Printers. Netherlands
Process: Lithography
Stamp Layout: Pane of 25 stamps
Design Touch-up: Feng Gang Hua
Perforation: 13.75 x 15 ( both sides have a straight-edged oval perforation )
Stamp Size: 45mm x 28mm
Paper :Paper with Security Fibres
Souvenir Sheet Size:135 mm × 85 mm
Date of Issue: 21 October 2010

These series of stamps recalled childhood memory - with various old games displayed, such as sticks and stones and paper folding.

=== 2005 Children Stamps - Andersen's Fairy Tales ===
Design:
The Ugly Duckling($1.4)
The Little Mermaid ($2.4)
Little Match Girl($3.0)
Emperor's New Clothes($5.0)
Printer:Joh Enshede 'B.V., the Netherlands
Process:Lithography
Stamp Layout:Pane of 25 stamps
Design Touch-up:Feng Gang Hua
Perforation:14.25 ( both sides have a straight-edged oval perforation )
Stamp Size:38mm x 38mm
Paper:Paper with Security Fibres
Souvenir Sheet Size:135 mm × 85 mm
Date of Issue:21 October 2010

Hong Kong Post put up with the Andersen's Fairy Tales to commemorate the 200th anniversary of Andersen's birth. He is a writer writing famous fairy tales, whose stories grant children with a wonderful adventure by reading those passages.

=== 2006 Children Stamps - Dress Bear Up ===
Design:
$1.40 - LEE Yuen-ching
$1.80 - LAM Sheung-nam, Sean
$2.40 - CHOW Chun-hin
$2.50 - LAU Hong-wan
$3 - CHIU Man-lok
$5 - LAU Hiu-tung, Michelle
Printer:Cartor Security Printing, France
Process:Lithography
Stamp Size:35 mm x 35 mm
Stamp Layout:Pane of 25 stamps
Souvenir Sheet Size:115 mm x 115 mm
Stamp Sheetlet Size:80 mm x 80 mm
Perforation:13.7 x 13.8 (one elliptical perforation on each vertical)
Paper:Paper with security fibres
Design Touch-up:KAN Tai-keung
Date of Issue:30 March 2006

These series of stamps inspire children to create. They are invited to design clothes for little bears, which not only enhances their ingenuity, but also raises public awareness towards children stamps.

=== 2007 - Children Stamps - Bunny Fun and Games ===
- http://www.hongkongpoststamps.hk/eng/newsletter/2007/02/20070227a.htm

=== 2008 - Children Stamps - Paper Folding Fun ===
- http://www.hongkongpoststamps.hk/eng/newsletter/2008/04/20080429a.htm

=== 2010 - Children Stamps - Hong Kong in My Eyes ===
- http://www.hongkongpoststamps.hk/eng/newsletter/2010/10/20101004a.htm

=== 2011 - Children Stamps - Chinese Idioms and Their Stories ===
- http://www.hongkongpoststamps.hk/eng/newsletter/2011/06/20110610a.htm

=== 2013 - Children Stamps - My Pet and I ===
- http://www.hongkongpoststamps.hk/eng/newsletter/2013/03/20130305a.htm

== Exhibition ==
Children and Educational Stamps exhibition at the Postal Gallery located on Ground Floor, General Post Office.

Highlights: Preview of "Children Stamps – Chinese and Foreign Folklore" stamp issue to be released on 16 July 2015
