= Postage stamps and postal history of Hong Kong =

This is a survey of the postage stamps and postal history of Hong Kong.

== British Colony, 1841–1997 ==
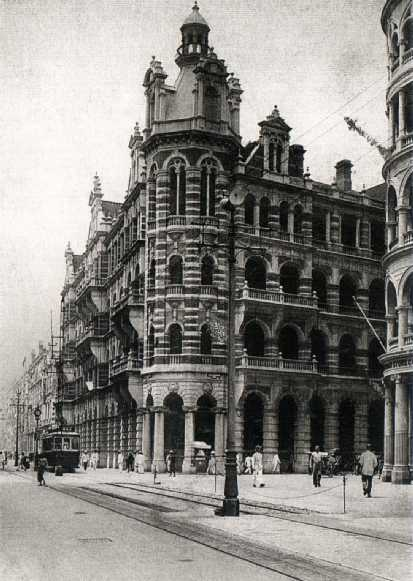
General Post Office circa 1911

The postal system in the British colony of Hong Kong began in 1841 when the Royal Mail established the first General Post Office in the region. Between 1841 and 1862, no stamps were issued, and postmarks were used to certify payment of the postage instead. The earliest postmarks were used by military field offices, and read "MILITARY POST OFFICE CHINA" (c. 1842) and "MILITARY POST OFFICE HONG KONG" (1841–1842). An assortment of postmarks were used for civilian purposes, their contents usually a combination of "HONG KONG" and "PAID". All such postmarks were not used after the issuance of the first stamps in 1862.

In 1860, Governor Sir Hercules Robinson requested a supply of stamps to be used in Hong Kong, but his request was refused in preference of the use of locally issued stamps. On 8 December 1862, the first local stamps were issued, printed by De La Rue and engraved by Ferdinand Joubert, featuring the portrait of Queen Victoria in seven denominations. The circulation of the first series was intended to last for two years. In 1863, four new values, with similar designs save for the addition of watermarks, were added. Thereafter, new values were added intermittently up until 1871. Stamps were not popularly used even after the appearance of the first stamps. At the time, customarily, the receiver rather than the sender was responsible for the postage fee. Therefore, senders were apprehensive of paying the postage before mailing. Nonetheless, the use of local stamps became compulsory by law in 1864. Following the release of the first stamps, a large variety of values and surcharges were introduced in the colony, mostly due to the difficulty and time of communication between the colony and UK.

In 1877, Hong Kong joined the Universal Postal Union.

In 1891, the first commemorative stamp was issued to celebrate the Hong Kong's 50th anniversary as a British colony. It was a limited edition of the 1883 two-cent carmine Queen's head, overprinted with "1841 HONG KONG JUBILEE 1891". Only 50,000 of the stamp were printed, with a stated on-sale period of only three days. The stamp was the world's first overprinted commemorative stamp. It was also Hong Kong's first first day cover, postmarked with the issuing date but with no specific designs on the cover. The first day of sale, 22 January 1891, saw a large crowd of stamp collectors attracted by the stamp's rarity. At 7 a.m., on the opening of sale, each person was only allowed to purchase 25 of the commemorative stamp. By 8 a.m., each was only allowed 20. Chaos during the sales saw the death of two Portuguese, crushed by the mob, and one Dutch sailor who was stabbed to death.

Between 1891 and 1941, only three other sets of commemorative stamps were issued, perhaps because of the bloodshed from the sale of the Jubilee stamp. These included the Silver Jubilee of King George V (1935), Coronation of King George VI (1937) and the centenary of British rule (1941). The 1941 centenary stamps, featuring local sights and scenes, marked the first time local features were incorporated into the stamp designs.

The death of Queen Victoria in 1901 and the reign of King Edward VII saw the release of a new series of definitives, commonly referred to as the "bald man"'s definitives (「光頭佬」) by local philatelists and stamp collectors. The first set (1903) of stamps featuring Edward VII consisted of 15 stamps. A second set (1904) was printed on different paper, followed by a partial set (1907) was printed with different colours. These definitives saw a change in spelling for the name of the colony, from "HONGKONG" to "HONG KONG". This change was kept in the definitives of King George V but was reverted to "HONGKONG" for the definitives of King George VI. No stamps for King Edward VIII were issued in Hong Kong. Apart from the differences in spelling, the stamp designs also did not agree on the translation of "cent" in Chinese. Victorian stamps featured either "先時" (sin-si) and "仙" (sin). Stamps of Edward VII featured "先" (sin), until it was finalized as "角" (kok, see Chinese jiao) during the reign of George VI. The George VI stamps also see the replacement of "scrolls" design at the top left and right of the stamp with a crown, along with the portrait of the monarch facing right, instead of the traditional left. In total, 23 stamps were issued for George VI.

Between 1 January 1917 and November 1922, Hong Kong stamps were used in Chinese and Japanese treaty ports. Stamps overprinted with "CHINA" were also used in response to the devaluation of the Chinese dollar. After the treaty ports' closures in November 1922, the "CHINA" overprints were used exclusively in the leased territory of Weihaiwei until its closure in 1930.

During the Second World War, the De La Rue factory in London was bombed, leading to the issuing of a series of George VI definitives printed on thinly-coated paper by Bradbury Wilkinson and Harrison, called the "rough paper wartime printings".

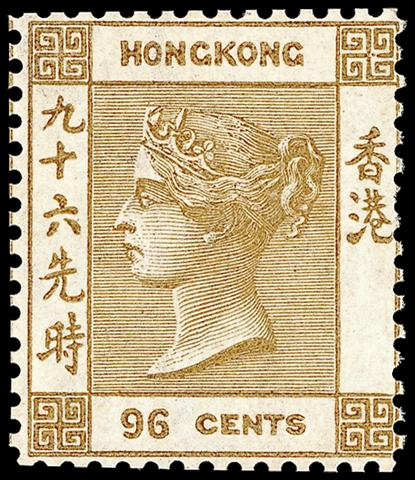
1862 96c stamp, one of the first seven stamps issued in 1862, with spelling "HONGKONG" and "先時" for "cents"

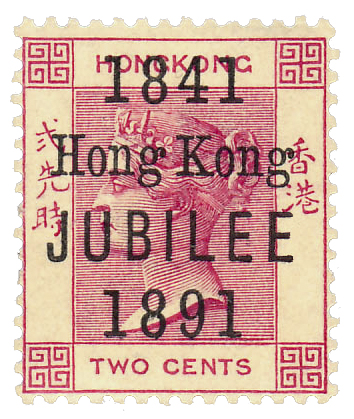
1891 Jubilee stamp, first commemorative stamp issued

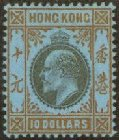
1903 $10 stamp, with spelling "HONG KONG"

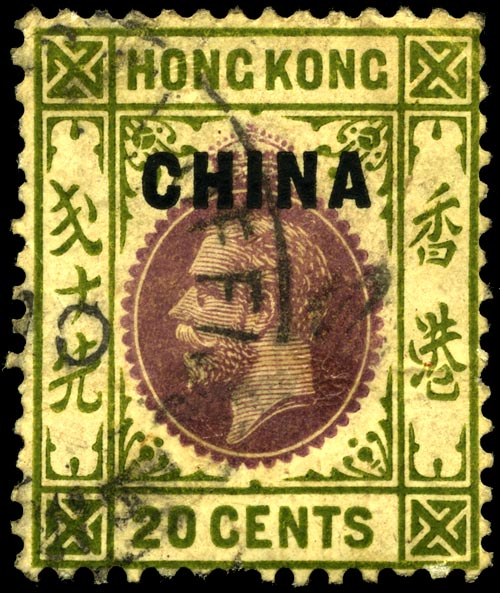
1917 20c stamp, overprinted for use in treaty ports, with spelling "HONG KONG" and "先" for "cents"

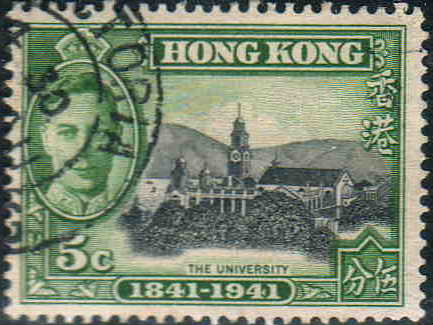
1941 5c commemorative stamp, one of the first stamps featuring local scenes, in this case the University of Hong Kong

=== Japanese Occupation, 1941–1945 ===
Hong Kong surrendered to Japan on 25 December 1941, marking the start of the Japanese occupation of Hong Kong. Postal services resumed in early 1942, with 20 or 21 Japanese definitives were introduced for use in Hong Kong. As a response to hyperinflation during the occupation, three stamp issues were surcharged with a higher value. These were also overprinted with "Office of the Governor of Hong Kong" (Japanese: 香港總督部). Censorship, changes of local addresses into a Japanese format, and renaming of district and building names into names of Japanese origins led to a chaotic postal system during the occupation.

Most of the British stamps were safely hidden until Japan's surrender. Some were stored in the vaults of the General Post Office and the Hongkong and Shanghai Banking Corporation building, while others were sent to Australia and South Africa for safekeeping.

=== Post-War, 1945–1997 ===
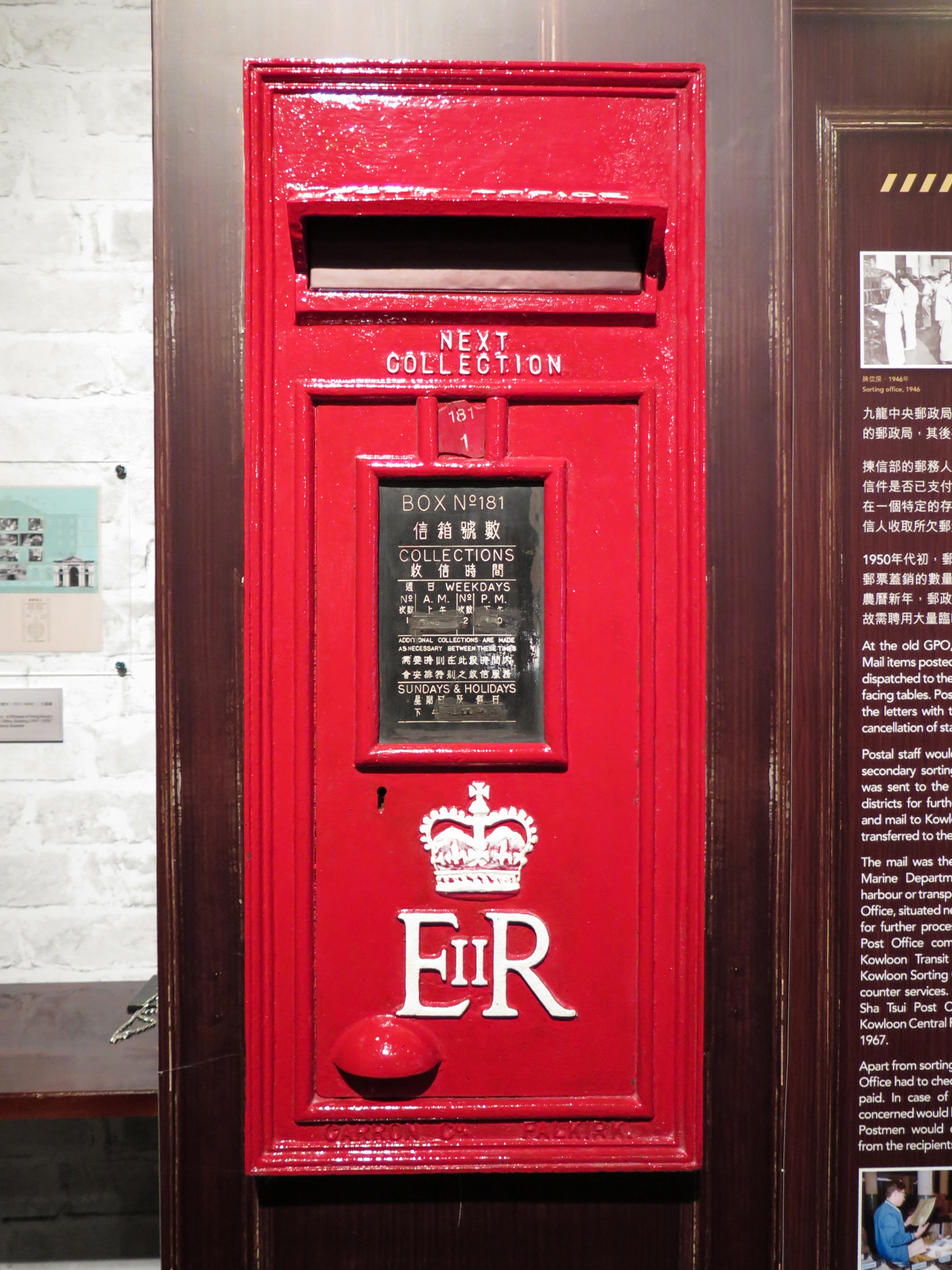
Post box of Hong Kong before 1997, with the royal cypher of Queen Elizabeth II

Japan surrendered on 15 August 1945, and postal service under the British resumed on 25 August, initially for free. No stamps were available, so octagonal handstamps inscribed with ‘HONG KONG 1945 POSTAGE PAID’ were later used in lieu of stamps. In early September, the government rediscovered the stash of hidden stamps. Together with the return of the stamp cache from Australia and South Africa, the sales of stamps re-continued on 28 September.

The end of the Second World War saw the release of the "Victory" commemorative stamps (30 August 1946) on the anniversary of the British takeover. The 30-cent and 1-dollar stamps were designed by Postmaster Edward Irvine Wynne-Jones and Chief Draughtsman of the Public Works Department William E Jones during their internment in the Stanley Internment Camp by the Japanese. The design featured a phoenix with the Latin text "1941 RESURGO 1945", along with the Chinese text "鳳鳥復興 漢英昇平" (Phoenix Resurgence; Han-British Peace). The Chinese text was rendered as "鳳鳥復興 漢英大和" in the original draft, which had the same meaning. However, as "大和" was also a rendition of "Yamato", the text was changed to alternate Chinese characters. The same month also saw the return of some George VI definitives that were printed in 1941 but remained undelivered to Hong Kong until 1946.

The reign of Queen Elizabeth II saw several significant changes to stamp design. While the first series (1954) retained the design of the George VI stamps, the second series (1962) saw significant changes. The series, designed by Chinese Cheung Yat-man, did not feature the traditional frames of the previous stamps, instead featuring a frameless portrait of Queen Elizabeth II by Pietro Annigoni. The larger values were printed in colour and in a larger physical size. This series is nicknamed the "military attire" (「軍裝」) series by local stamp collectors.

1962 saw the release of the first officially designed envelopes for first day covers, marked with "OFFICIAL FIRST DAY COVER", for the 100th anniversary of the first postage stamp of Hong Kong. Prior to 1962, there were no official designs other than the postmarked date, and envelopes were designed instead by hobbyists such as the Hong Kong Philatelic Society and the China Philatelic Association.

Commemorative stamps with Chinese themes were first issued in 1967, featuring the Chinese zodiac. The bauhinia flower and Hong Kong's coat of arms were also incorporated as the key features on two denominations issued in 1968, the first time that local themes had been integrated in the territory's definitive stamps. The addition of Chinese and local themes and features, along with designs by local Hong Kongers, became increasingly common in the 1970s and onward. The third series (1973) featured a reproduction of the bas-relief by Arnold Machin, a design feature that would be retained in all following new series. The fourth series (1983) saw the introduction of fluorescent security markings in a design by Arthur Hacker. The fifth series (1987) featured 15 stamps. In 1988, the fifth series was reprinted with a change in shading on the Queen's lower lip. These were reprinted in 1989, 1990 and 1991 as the stocks for certain values were running out.

In the early and mid 1990s, as the Handover of Hong Kong of 1 July 1997 drew near, British-themed stamps were slowly being phased out. The sixth issue (2 September 1996) was the last set of stamps featuring Elizabeth II. This led to an "explosion" of sales and stamp collecting in the local stamp market, with many hoping the stamps would sell for a profit in the future.

On 23 May 1996, it was announced that all stamps with a portrait of the Queen or any British features would become invalid on the day of the handover. A "transitional" set of definitives was issued to prepare for the handover. Nicknamed the "neutral definitive stamps" (26 January 1997), they featured the skyline of Victoria Harbour with no British features. The neutral definitives could still be used after the handover, and colonial stamps could be exchanged up until 31 July 1997.

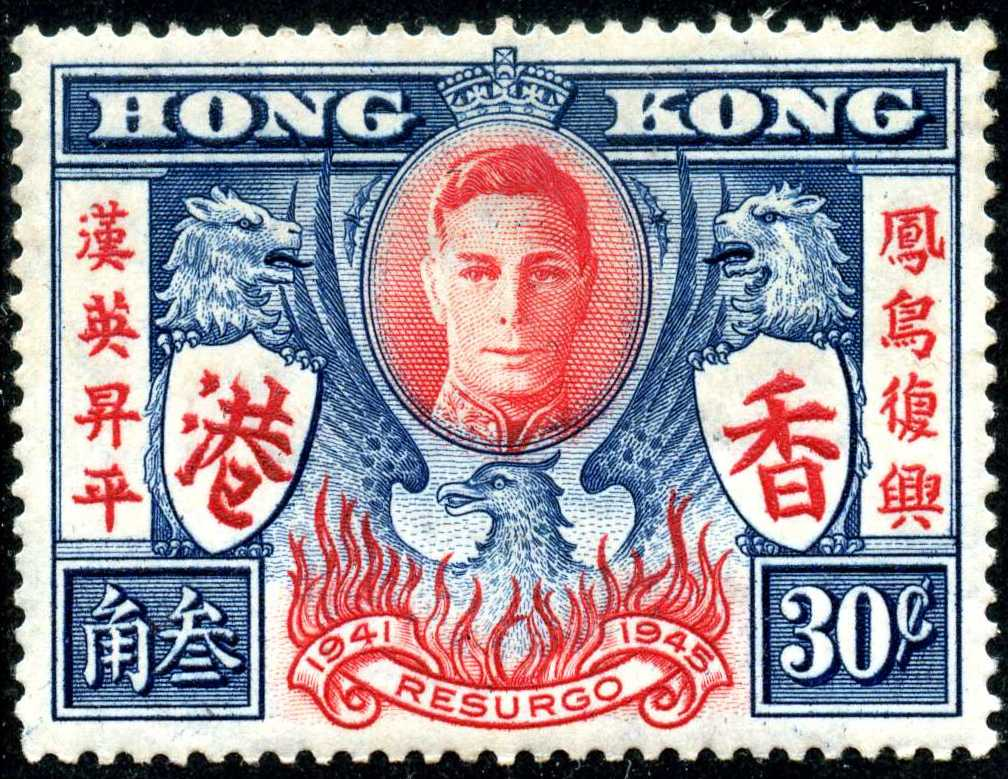
1946 30c "Resurgo" stamp, designed by British POWs during WW2

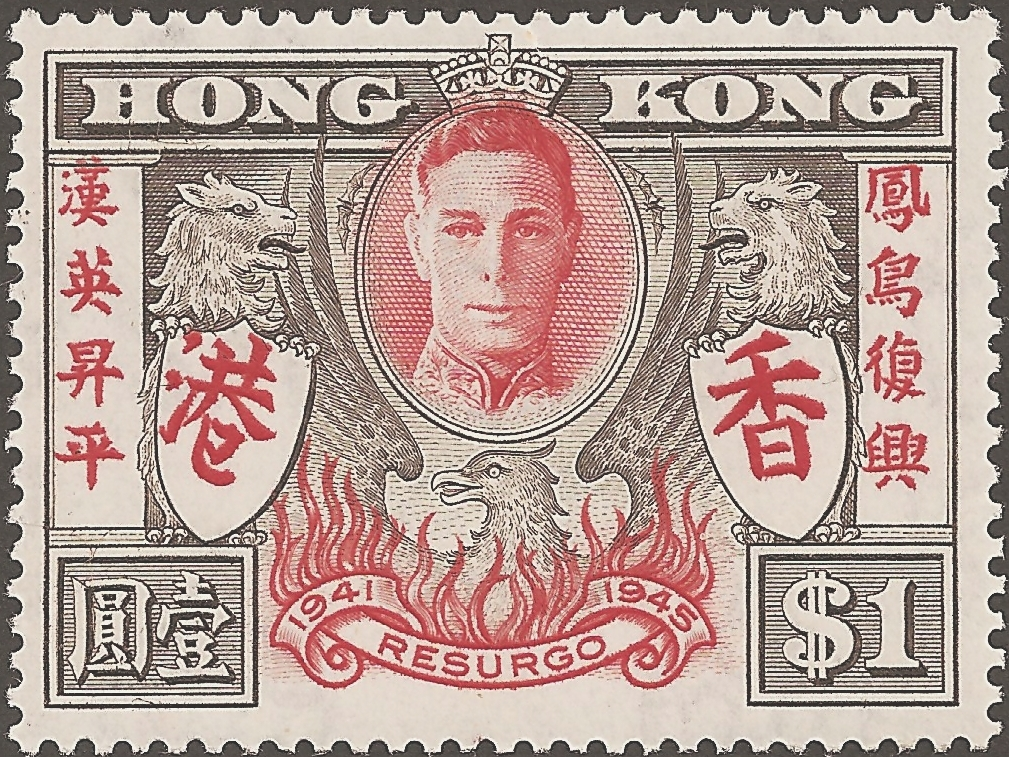
1946 $1 "Resurgo" stamp, designed by British POWs during WW2

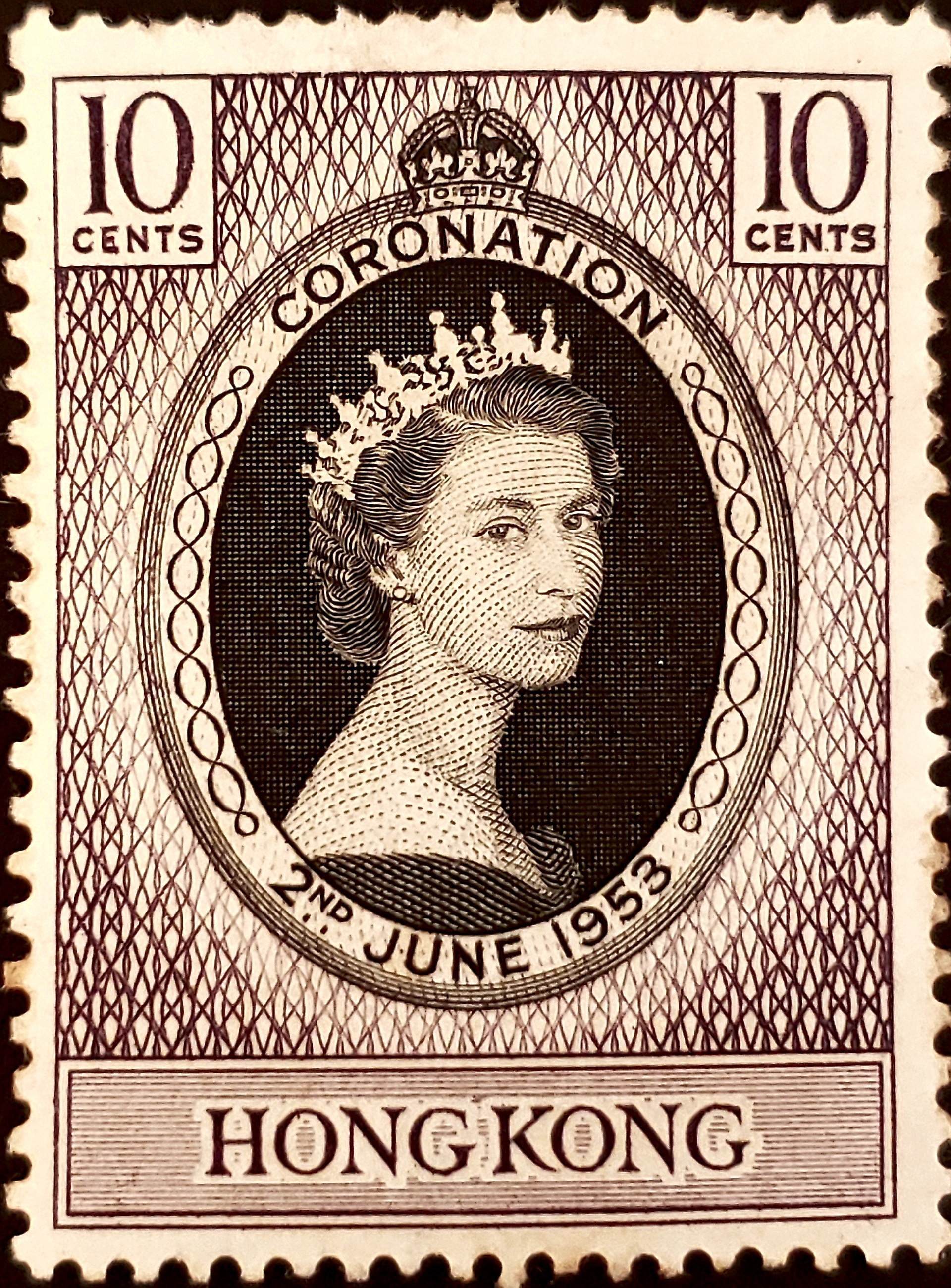
1953 10c commemorative stamp issued for the Coronation of Elizabeth II

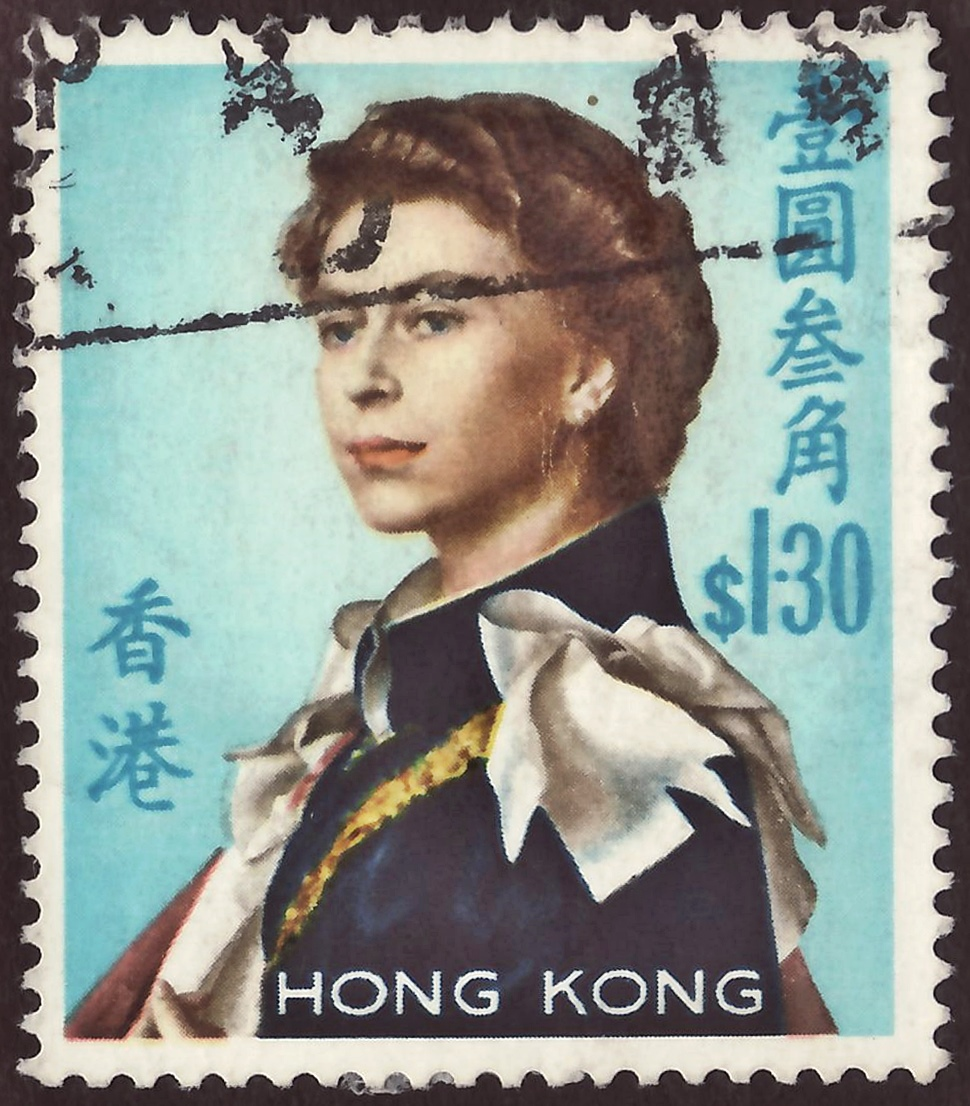
1962 $1.30 stamp, one of the first frameless definitives

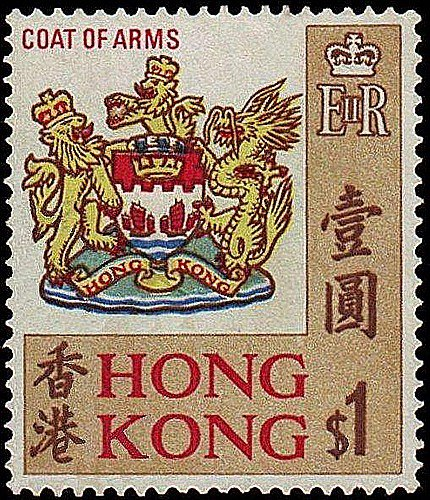
1968 $1 stamp, one of the first definitive stamps featuring local themes, in this case coat of arms

== Post-handover ==
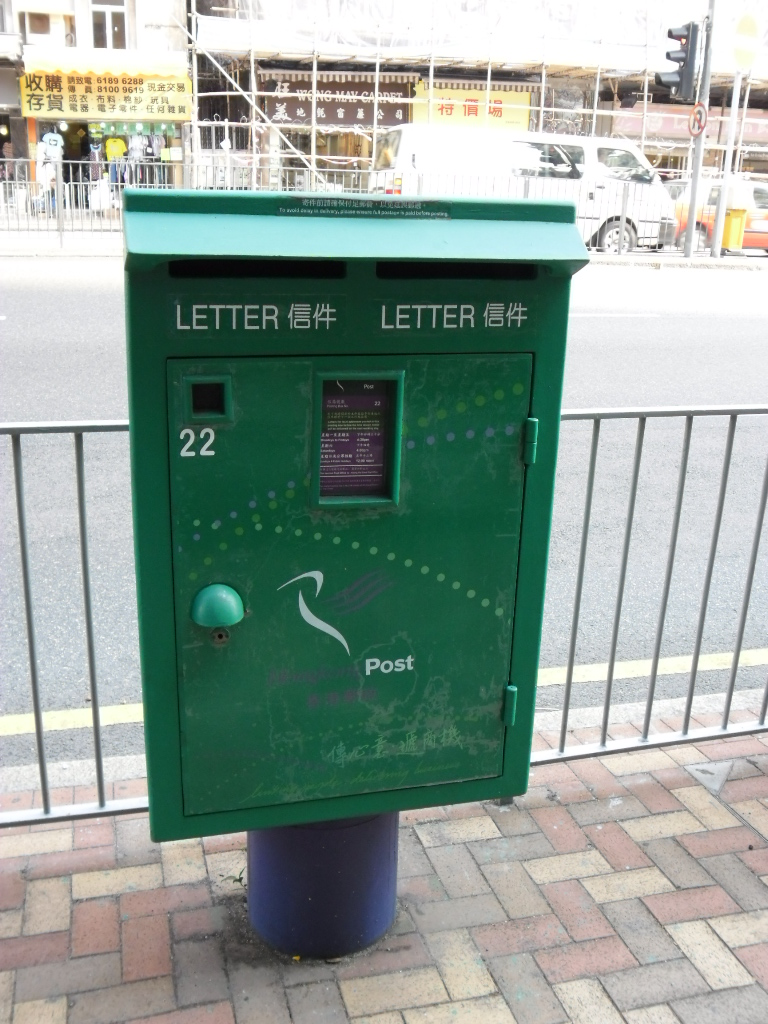
Post box on Argyle Street, 2011

A set of commemorative stamp, celebrating the handover, was issued in 1997.

The first definitive stamps were issued by the government on 18 October 1999, bearing the name "HONG KONG, CHINA". The stamps featured local sights and scenes. Between 1999 and 2020, three more sets of definitives were issued: The "East and West" series (2002), the birds of Hong Kong series (2006) and the "Hong Kong UNESCO Global Geopark" series (2014).

== See also ==
- China Philatelic Society of London
- China Stamp Society
- Hong Kong Children's Stamps
- Hong Kong Philatelic Society
- Revenue stamps of Hong Kong

== Sources ==
- Stanley Gibbons Ltd: various catalogues.
- Rossiter, Stuart & John Flower. The Stamp Atlas. London: Macdonald, 1986. ISBN 0-356-10862-7
- Webb, Francis Wynne (1961) The Philatelic and Postal History of Hong Kong and the Treaty Ports of China and Japan, Royal Philatelic Society London
