= China Stamp Society =

US non-profit organization

- Founded: 1936
- Type: New York not-for-profit organization
- Purpose: China, including the Treaty Ports, Foreign Offices in China, the Japanese Occupation, Hong Kong, Macao, Manchukuo and Tibet
- Location: Columbus, Ohio, USA
- Region served: worldwide
- Method: chapters, journal, shows
- Key people: board of directors
- Revenue: membership
- Website: China Stamp Society
- China Stamp Society is the oldest active affiliate of the American Philatelic Society

The China Stamp Society is a philatelic organization dedicated to the appreciation of the postage stamps and postal history of China, including the Treaty Ports, Foreign Offices in China, the Japanese Occupation, Hong Kong, Macao, Manchukuo and Tibet.

== Chapters ==
China Stamp Society chapters in the United States are located at: San Francisco Bay, California (Chiu Chin Shan Chapter); Los Angeles, California (Chia Nan Chapter); Chicago, Illinois (Ping Yuan Zhi Zhu Chapter); Dallas - Ft. Worth Area (North Texas Chapter); and, Seattle, Washington (Chang Qing Long Chapter).

International chapters are located at: The Republic of China (Taipei Chapter), People's Republic of China (China Chapter), and Japan Chapter, Tokyo.

== Convention ==
The national convention is held in Los Angeles, California, at the SESCAL World Series of Philately (WSP) stamp show on even-numbered years. On odd numbered years, the meeting is held in other parts of the country. The annual board of directors meeting is held at the convention. In 2009, the annual meeting was held at BALPEX in Baltimore, Maryland. The 2010 meeting is scheduled for SESCAL in Los Angeles, California, and the 2011 meeting is scheduled for CHICAGOPEX in Chicago, Illinois.

== Services provided ==
The society provides a number of services related to China philately, including on-line stamp sales, expertizing service, identification service, translation services, discounts on books, library borrowing privileges, and scholarships for young collectors.

== Membership ==
Membership is available to all collectors of stamps of China. Membership may be requested through the website or by mail to The China Stamp Society, Inc., P.O. Box 20711, Columbus, Ohio 43220 USA.

== Publications ==
The China Clipper magazine is published every other month. It has been published continuously since 1936, and contains articles on China philately as well as society business and schedules of upcoming events.

The society owns the rights to the Ma Stamp Catalogue and is currently working on an updated edition

== Meritorious Service Award ==
In 1995, the society’s Meritorious Service Award was established and is awarded to members of the society who, through their meritorious work, have enhanced the goals of the society.

== See also ==
- China Philatelic Society of London
- Postage stamps and postal history of China
- Postage stamps and postal history of Hong Kong
- Postage stamps and postal history of Taiwan
