= China Philatelic Society of London =

- Formation: 1 June 1957
- Type: Philatelic
- Website: www.cpsl.org.uk

The China Philatelic Society of London (CPSL) is a philatelic organisation devoted to the study of all aspects of Chinese philately from the Municipal Posts of the Treaty Ports to the People's Republic and Taiwan.

== Origins ==
The Society was formed on 1 June 1957 from the China Section of the City of London Philatelic Society, whose bulletins were reprinted by the CPSL in 1986. The first Chairman was Sir David Roseway and the first Editor of the Journal was James Negus.

== Activities ==
The society runs a regular auction, exchange packet service and maintains a library known as the H.B.R. Clarke Library. The Journal of Chinese Philately is published six times per annum.

Membership is open worldwide but is mainly within the United Kingdom. Membership exceeded 300 as at June 2011. A counterpart, the China Stamp Society, operates in the United States.

== Selected publications ==
- Lane, E.N. The Local Republican Overprints of 1911-12, 1985.
- City of London Philatelic Society (China Section) Vol. 1 Bulletin Numbers 1-52, October 1944-April 1954, 1986.
- Padget, P.I. The Revenue Stamps of Communist China 1929-1955, 3rd edition, 1986.
- Beales, K.H. & E.F. Aglen. The Waterlow Issue of 1898, 1987. ISBN 1-870620-00-3
- Davey, P.N. The Parcel Post Stamps of China, 1989. ISBN 1-870620-01-1

== See also ==
- China Stamp Society
- Postage stamps and postal history of China
- Postage stamps and postal history of Hong Kong
- Postage stamps and postal history of Taiwan
