= Jaswantsinhji =

Maharana of Danta (1876–1908)

- Maharana

Maharana of Danta
- Reign: 1 December 1876 – 27 April 1908
- Predecessor: Harisinhji
- Successor: Hamirsinhji
- Born: 14 October 1850
- Died: 27 April 1908 (aged 57)
- Dynasty: Parmar
- Father: Harisinhji

Jaswantsinhji (14 October 1850 – 1908) was the Maharana of Danta from 1876 until 1908.

== Early life and family ==
He was born on 14 October 1850 to Harisinhji. He married and had issue three sons, Hamirsinhji, Fatehsinhji, and Dalpatsinhji, and a daughter, who married Prithvi Singh, the Maharawal of Banswara. While he was still the heir apparent, he administered the state owing to the advanced age of his father.

== Reign ==
Upon the death of his father, he succeeded him as the Maharana of Danta on 1 December 1876. He personally looked into all the details of the administration. In 1878, he signed an agreement with the British Government regarding opium. The British Government in 1886 conferred on him the title of Maharana, which his family has held since the days of their ancestor Askaranji, who received it from Akbar. In 1898, British Government also restored the status of second-class to his state. He built dharamshalas, tanks, wells, and roads. He donated liberally to the cause of education and contributed a sum of Rs. 8,000 to Scott College at Sadra. When his state fell victim to the terrible Indian famine of 1899–1900, he opened the state treasury as well as his own private purse to provide large sums of money for the purchase of food and clothing for his people. He made all possible provision for the preservation of the lives of cattle, which were almost the sole means of livelihood for his people. In 1903, he was granted a salute of nine guns as a personal distinction.

== Death ==
He died on 27 April 1908 and was succeeded by his eldest son, Hamirsinhji.
