= Naharsinhji =

Maharana of Danta (1823–1847)

- Maharana

Maharana of Danta
- Reign: c. 1823 – c. 1847
- Predecessor: Jagatsinhji
- Successor: Zalamsinhji
- Died: c. 1847
- Dynasty: Parmar
- Father: Abhaisinhji

Naharsinhji was the Maharana of Danta from 1823 until 1847.

== Early life and family ==
Naharsinhji was born to Abhaisinhji. He married and had issue, including two sons, Zalamsinhji and Harisinhji, and a daughter, Daulat Kanwar, who married Sheo Singh of Sirohi. He and his brother Jagatsinhji did not enjoy a cordial relationship. To bring peace between the two, the nobles of Danta made them partake in the ritual of Kasumba. (Note: Kasumba, or opium drinking, was a ritual that was prevalent among Rajputs. On occasions when a quarrel between two parties was settled, they would drink opium-water to rejoice, and as a mark that the cause of the offence had been forgotten by the parties.) Jagatsinhji, having no son of his own, wished to adopt one so that, in due course, the boy would succeed him on the throne of Danta. However, Naharinhji refused, saying that he would not do obeisance at his own son's feet. Following this episode, Jagatsinhji's advisers turned him against Naharsinhji, and Jagatsinhji, who had begun to fear that Naharsinhji wanted to take his life, left Danta. Naharsinhji, however, managed to convince Jagatsinhji to return to Danta.

== Reign ==
Upon the death of his brother Jagatsinhji in 1823, he succeeded him as the Maharana of Danta. In 1836, when Jawan Singh, the Maharana of Udaipur, was to arrive in his state for the privilege of Ambaji Mata, he went to Ambaji to receive him and gave him a warm and proper welcome. Later, when the Governor of Bombay paid a visit to Sadra, he went there to meet him, and the Governor, in return, presented him with a rich khilat, or dress of honour.

== Death ==
He died in 1847 and was succeeded by his son, Zalamsinhji, as the Maharana of Danta.
