= Jagatsinhji =

Maharana of Danta (1800–1823)

- Maharana

Maharana of Danta
- Reign: c. 1800 – c. 1823
- Predecessor: Mansinhji
- Successor: Naharsinhji
- Died: c. 1860
- Dynasty: Parmar
- Father: Abhaisinhji

Jagatsinhji was the Maharana of Danta from 1800 until 1823.

== Biography ==
Jagatsinhji was born to Abhaisinhji, and upon the death of his brother Mansinhji in 1800, he succeeded him on the throne of Danta as the Maharana. He was a strong ruler who dealt with Bhil cattle thieves and enforced his authority across several villages by exacting tribute from them. During his reign, he did not get along with his nobles. The Nawab of Palanpur helped him to settle his dispute with his vassal Vakhtoji Jitoji quietly. Later, in another dispute between him and one of his vassals, he granted a seven-sixteenths share of Danta to the Nawab of Palanpur, on the condition that the latter ruler help him maintain order in Danta. He also did not get along with his brother, Naharsinhji, which led the nobles of the state to intervene between the two. The nobles managed to reconcile the two brothers by having them partake in the ceremony of Kasumba. (Note: Kasumba, or opium drinking, was a ritual that was prevalent among Rajputs. On occasions when a quarrel between two parties was settled, they would drink opium-water to rejoice, and as a mark that the cause of the offence had been forgotten by the parties.) The friendly relationship between them did not last long, as his advisors turned him against his brother. He had no son to succeed him, so he asked his brother, Naharsinhji, whether he might adopt one of his sons. Naharsinhji refused, saying that he would not do obeisance at his own son's feet. Afterwards, suspecting that Naharsinhji might harm him, he fled his state and lived in self imposed exile at Sudasana and Pethapur. Naharsinhji eventually managed to calm him and brought him back to Danta.

He died in 1823 of fever and was succeeded by his brother Naharsinhji.
