= Mansinhji =

Maharana of Danta (1795–1800)

- Maharana

Maharana of Danta
- Reign: c. 1795 – c. 1800
- Predecessor: Abhaisinhji
- Successor: Jagatsinhji
- Died: c. 1800
- Dynasty: Parmar
- Father: Abhaisinhji

Mansinhji was the Maharana of Danta from 1795 until 1800.

== Early life and family ==
He was born as the eldest son of Abhaisinhji. He assisted his father in expelling the Maratha general, Arjun Rao, from Danta.

== Reign ==
Upon the death of his father in 1795, he succeeded him as the Maharana of Danta. He proved himself to be a vigorous ruler and, during his reign, increased the power of the state. He first invaded Poshina and then participated in a mulukhgiri campaign with Gambhirsinhji, the Maharaja of Idar. (Note: The term Mulukhgiri is derived from two Persian words, mulk, meaning land or country, and giriftan, meaning to take or to seize. It was a type of campaign conducted either to annex the territories of others or to extract payments or arrears from them. This system was introduced by the Muslims in India, and the Marathas followed it on a regular basis.)

== Death ==
He died in 1800 and was succeeded by his brother, Jagatsinhji.
