= Hamirsinhji =

Maharana of Danta (1908–1925)

- Maharana

Maharana of Danta
- Reign: 27 April 1908 – 19 November 1925
- Predecessor: Jaswantsinhji
- Successor: Bhawanisinhji
- Born: 21 December 1869
- Died: 19 November 1925 (aged 55)
- Spouse: Bhoor Kanwar
- Issue: Bhawanisinhji; Balwantsinhji
- House: Danta
- Dynasty: Parmar
- Father: Jaswantsinhji
- Education: Mayo College

Hamirsinhji (21 December 1869 – 19 November 1925) was the Maharana of Danta from 1908 until 1925.

== Early life, family, and education ==
He was born on 21 December 1869 to Jaswantsinhji. He was educated at the Mayo College, Ajmer. He married Bhoor Kanwar, daughter of Thakur Laxman Singh of Munpura, under Jakhan, and had issue, two sons, Bhawanisinhji and Balwantsinhji.

== Reign ==
Upon the death of his father on 27 April 1908, he succeeded to the throne of Danta as the Maharana. He was at first greatly assisted in the affairs of the State by his uncle, Mohobutsinhji, and later by his heir apparent, Bhawanisinhji. One of the most important events of his reign was the settlement of an old dispute, under which his state had to pay an annual levy of Rs. 500 to Palanpur, with Palanpur. Upon the arrival of George V and Mary at Apollo Bundar in Mumbai on 2 December 1911, to preside over the Delhi Durbar of 1911, he was among those who were presented to them there.

== Death ==
He died on 19 November 1925 and was succeeded by Bhawanisinhji.
