= Sardarsinhji =

Maharana of Danta (1859–1860)

- Maharana

Maharana of Danta
- Reign: c. 1859 – c. 1860
- Predecessor: Zalamsinhji
- Successor: Harisinhji
- Died: c. 1860
- Dynasty: Parmar
- Father: Zalamsinhji

Sardarsinhji was the Maharana of Danta from 1859 until 1860.

== Biography ==
Sardarsinhji was born to Zalamsinhji, the Maharana of Danta, and upon the death of his father in 1859, he ascended the throne of Danta. His reign was short-lived, as he died six months after his accession and was succeeded by his uncle Harisinhji on the throne.
