= Ghanshyamsinhji Ajitsinhji =

Maharaja of Dhrangadhra

Ghanshyamsinhji Ajitsinhji GCIE KCSI GCStJ
- His Highness; Maharana Maharaja
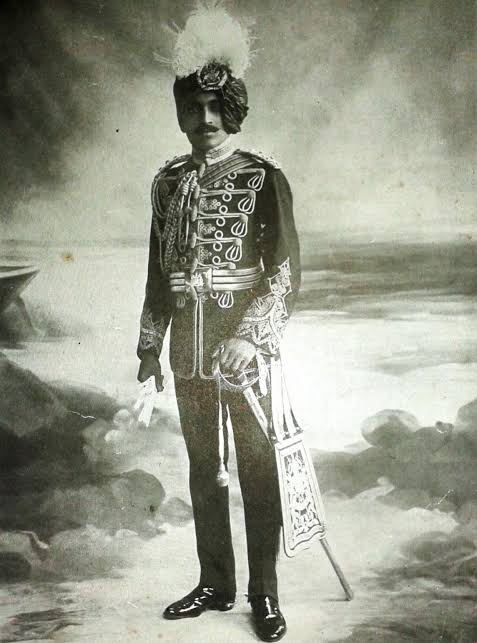
- HH Maharana Maharaja Ghanshyamsinhji

Maharana Maharaja of Jhalavad
- Reign: 1911– 1942
- Predecessor: Ajitsinhji of Dhrangadhra
- Successor: Mayurdhwajsinhji
- Born: 31 May 1889; Ajit Vilas Palace, Dhrangadhra State
- Died: 4 February 1942 (aged 52–53); Arsi Vilas palace, Dhrangadhra State
- Wives: Rani Pravin Kuwarba; Maharani Prem kunwarba; Maharani Anand Kunwarba; Maharani Ram Kanwar; Maharani Vijay Kanwar
- Issue Among 15 others: Mayurdhwajsinhji; Krishna Kumari
Names
- Ghanshayamsinhji Ajitsinhji Jhala
- House: Dhrangadhra
- Dynasty: Jhala
- Father: Ajitsinhji Jhala
- Mother: Sunderba Sahiba Jadeja of Nawanagar

HH Major Shri Maharana Maharaja Ghanshyamsinhji Ajitsinhji, GCIE, KCSI, GCStJ, was the 44th ruler of the Kingdom of Dhrangadhra from 1911 to 1942. He was succeeded by his son Mayurdhwajsinhji alias Meghrajji III.

== Early life ==
Ghanshyamsinhji was born on 31 May 1889 as the eldest son of HH Maharana Raj Sahib Ajitsinhji of Dhrangadhra and his first wife, Rani Sundar Kunwarba Jadeja. He received his education at Rajkumar College, Rajkot, Chircombe School, Bideford, United Services College, Westward Ho!, and Southsea, Hants. He served as the Major-General of the Dhrangadhra State Force in 1909, as Chief Directorate of the Dhrangadhra State Force, and as Commissioner of police from 1909 to 1911.

== Reign ==
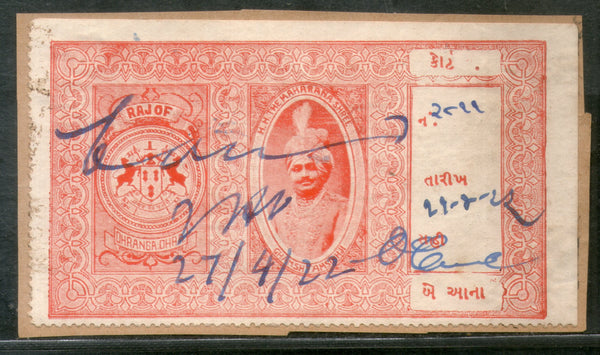
Dhrangadhra state stamp featuring HH Maharana Raj Sahib Ghanshyam Singhji

He ascended the gaddi soon after his father's death on 20 February 1911 at Amar Mahal, Jhalleshwara vat Palace, Dhrangadhra. He was promoted to a permanent salute of 13-guns (15-guns personal) together with the hereditary title of Maharaja on 1 January 1918. He attended the funeral of the King Emperor George V in London in 1936. He also built a maternity hospital, girls' middle school, and veterinary hospital, extended the railways, promoted the salt industry, and established the heavy chemical industry. He served as Hon Major in the 3rd Cavalry (Duke of Connaught's Own Lancers). He found the Sri Shaktimat Makhapraphulla, Order of Jhalavad Medal in 1933.

He was awarded Knight Commander of the Star of India (KCSI) on 1 January 1917 and Knight Grand Commander of the Order of the Indian Empire (GCIE) on 3 June 1922.

== Death ==
He died from diabetic coma, at Arsi Vilas, Dhrangadhra on 4 February 1942. He was succeeded by his son Mayurdhwajsinhji.

== Family ==
Ghanshaymsinhji had 5 wives and 15 children: 6 sons and 9 daughters.

=== Wives ===
- Rani Pravin Kunverba Jadeja, daughter of Chandrasinhji Keshrisinhji Jadeja of Mengni, under Nawanagar
- Maharani Prem Kunverba Vaghela, daughter of Thakore Fatehsinhji Sardarsinhji of Bhadarwa
- Maharani Anand Kunverba, daughter of Thakore of Kotda Sangani
- Maharani Ram Kunwar Chundawat, daughter of Rao Shivnath Singh of Amet in Mewar
- Maharani Vijay Kunverba, daughter of Maharaj Jawansinhji Jivansinhji of Sarodar, under Nawanagar

=== Issues ===
- Ajitsinhji
- Mayurdhwajsinhji
- Jahvirsinhji
- Virendrasinhji
- Dharmendrasinhji
- Sajjan Kunverba m. Maharawal Chandrabir Singhji of Banswara
- Kusum Kunverba
- Harsad Kunverba, m. Raja Sudarshandev Sing of Shahpura
- Mahendra Kunverba, m. Maharawat Ram Singh II of Pratapgarh
- Kriti Kunverba, m. Thakur Devi Singh of Deolia
- Jayavant Kunverba, m. Rao Harendra of Kushalgarh
- Krishna Kunverba m. Maharaja Hanwant Singh of Jodhpur
- Dhairya Kunverba, m. Maharajkumar Brijendra Pal of Karauli
- Himmat Kunverba, Rao Umaid Singh of Masuda

== Titles ==
- 1900-1911: Patvi Namdar Rajkumar Shri Ghanshyamsinjhi Ajitsinhji Sahib, Yuvraj of Dhrangadhra.
- 1911-1917: His Highness Shri Shaktimant Jhaladipati Mahamandleshwar Maharana Sriraj Ghanshyamsinhji Ajitsinhji Sahib Bahadur, Maharana Raj Sahib of Dhrangadhra
- 1917-1918: His Highness Shri Shaktimant Jhaladipati Mahamandleshwar Maharana Sriraj Ghanshyamsinjhi Ajitsinhji Sahib Bahadur, Maharana Raj Sahib of Dhrangadhra, KCSI
- 1918-1924: His Highness Shri Shaktimant Jhaladipati Mahamandleshwar Maharana Sriraj Maharaja Ghanshyamsinjhi Ajitsinhji Sahib Bahadur, Maharaja Raj Sahib of Dhrangadhra, KCSI
- 1922-1924: His Highness Shri Shaktimant Jhaladipati Mahamandleshwar Maharana Sriraj Maharaja Ghanshyamsinjhi Ajitsinhji Sahib Bahadur, Maharaja Raj Sahib of Dhrangadhra, GCIE, KCSI
- 1924-1937: His Highness Shri Shaktimant Jhaladipati Mahamandleshwar Maharana Sriraj Maharaja Ghanshyamsinjhi Ajitsinhji Sahib Bahadur, Maharaja Raj Sahib of Dhrangadhra, GCIE, KCSI, GCStJ
- 1937-1942: His Highness Major Shri Shaktimant Jhaladipati Mahamandleshwar Maharana Sriraj Maharaja Ghanshyamsinjhi Ajitsinhji Sahib Bahadur, Maharaja Raj Sahib of Dhrangadhra, GCIE, KCSI, GCStJ

== Awards and honours ==
- Recipient of the Delhi Durbar Gold Medal, 1911 as part of the 1911 Delhi Durbar Honours
- KCSI: Knight Commander of the Order of the Star of India, 1917
- GCIE: Knight Grand Commander of the Order of Indian Empire, 1922
- GCStJ: Bailiff Grand Cross of the Order of St John, 1924
- Recipient of the King George V Silver Jubilee Medal, 1935
- Recipient of the King George VI Coronation Medal, 1937
