= Harisinhji =

Maharana of Danta (1860–1876)

- Maharana

Maharana of Danta
- Reign: c. 1860 – 1 December 1876
- Predecessor: Sardarsinhji
- Successor: Jaswantsinhji
- Born: c. 1817
- Died: 1 December 1876
- Dynasty: Parmar
- Father: Naharsinhji

Harisinhji (1817 – 1 December 1876) was the Maharana of Danta from 1860 until 1876.

== Biography ==
Harisinhji was born in 1817 to Naharsinhji, the Maharana of Danta. He married and had issue: four sons, Jaswantsinhji, Mohobutsinhji, Ratansinhji, and Bhimsinhji. When his nephew Sardarsinhji died in 1860, he succeeded him as the Maharana of Danta. He built many tanks and public buildings. He died on 1 December 1876 and was succeeded by Jaswantsinhji.
