= Abhaisinhji =

Maharana of Danta (1748–1795)

- Maharana

Maharana of Danta
- Reign: c. 1748 – c. 1795
- Predecessor: Ratansinhji
- Successor: Mansinhji
- Died: c. 1795
- Issue: Mansinhji; Jagatsinhji; Naharsinhji
- Dynasty: Parmar
- Father: Karansinhji

Abhaisinhji was the Maharana of Danta from 1748 until 1795.

== Early life and family ==
Abhaisinhji was born to Karansinhji, the Maharana of Danta. He married and had three sons, namely Mansinhji, Jagatsinhji, and Naharsinhji.

== Reign ==
When his brother Ratansinhji died in 1748, he succeeded him on the throne of Danta as the Maharana. He was constantly in trouble with his nobles and vassals. To suppress them, he summoned from Baroda a Maratha general named Arjun Rao. Arjun arrived in Danta with a hundred horses of Gaekwad to aid him in suppressing insurgents. At first, Arjun only managed the state's administration. Over time, however, he claimed all the power and began building a fort for himself. This alarmed Abhaisinhji, who, together with his son Mansinhji, his nobles, and his vassals, drove Arjun out of Danta. He was able to achieve this by surrounding the Marathas in a narrow, isolated spot and cutting off all food and water to them. Unable to escape, the Marathas promised that they would abandon Danta and return to their homes. He then lifted the siege, and the Marathas quietly returned home.

== Death ==
He died in 1795, and was succeeded on the throne of Danta by his son, Mansinhji.
