= Zalamsinhji =

Maharana of Danta (1847–1859)

- Maharana

Maharana of Danta
- Reign: c. 1847 – c. 1859
- Predecessor: Naharsinhji
- Successor: Sardarsinhji
- Died: c. 1859
- Dynasty: Parmar
- Father: Naharsinhji

Zalamsinhji (or Jhalamsinhji) was the Maharana of Danta from 1847 until 1859.

== Early life and family ==
Zalamsinhji was born to Naharsinhji, the Maharana of Danta. He married and had a son, named Sardarsinhji, and a daughter, Guman Kumari, who married Kesari Singh, the Maharao of Sirohi.

== Reign ==
Upon the death of his father in 1847, he succeeded him on the throne of Danta as the Maharana. He went to Ahmedabad in 1854 to meet Mountstuart Elphinstone. In 1857, when the mutiny broke out in India, he supported the British cause and assisted them. When the Government of India began to introduce vaccination, he assisted them in their cause and accepted an agreement related to salt with them.

== Death ==
He died in 1859 and was succeeded by Sardarsinhji to his title, rank, and dignity.
