= Bhawanisinhji =

Maharana of Danta (1925–1948)

- Maharana

Maharana of Danta
- Reign: 19 November 1925 – 30 January 1948
- Predecessor: Hamirsinhji
- Successor: Prithvirajsinhji
- Born: 13 September 1899
- Died: c. 1961
- House: Danta
- Dynasty: Parmar
- Father: Hamirsinhji
- Education: Mayo College

Bhawanisinhji (13 September 1899 – 1961) was the Maharana of Danta from 1925 until 1948.

== Early life, family and education ==
He was born to Hamirsinhji on 13 September 1899, and was educated at Mayo College, Ajmer. He married firstly, in 1914, Vijay Kanwar, a daughter of Mool Singh, the Rao of Dattigaon, secondly a daughter of Bhagwant Raj Bahadur Singh, the Raja of Sohawal, and thirdly a daughter of Pratap Singh of Auwa. He had three sons, namely Prithvirajsinhji, Madhu Sudan Singh, and Raghubir Singh, and seven daughters, including Jitendra Kumari and Krishna Kumari.

While he was heir-apparent of Danta, he was associated with the administration of the State and inaugurated a number of useful reforms. In 1921, when the Bhils of Udaipur and the nearby states broke into revolt, the Bhils of Danta joined them. Seeing this, his father sent him to negotiate peace between the Bhils of their state. Following his father’s orders, he went into the hills to meet the Bhils and reminded them of the friendly relations that existed between their ancestors. He assured them that his father was not associated or connected in any way with the oppression that their fellows had faced and promised to resolve their issues. He fulfilled his word, and the Bhils of Danta returned to peace.

== Reign ==
Upon the death of his father, on 19 November 1925, he succeeded him as the Maharana of Danta, but it was not until 10 March 1926 that he ascended the throne. He instituted three orders in 1935–36, namely the Order of the Rajya Ratna Mandal, the Order of the Rajyalankar Mandal, and the Order of the Gunadarsha Mandal. During the Second World War, he offered his personal services and the entire resources of his state at the disposal of His Majesty's Government. Upon the partition of India, he acceded his state to the Dominion of India by signing the instrument of accession on 14 August 1947. He used to treat his subjects equally, without distinction of religion, caste, or creed, and it was due to his efforts that there were no communal tensions in his state at the time of the partition of India.

== Abdication ==
When all the states in Gujarat were merged with Bombay, leaving only Danta, Bhawanisinhji, who did not wish to renounce kingship, which he felt was entrusted to him by the Ambaji, after much thought informed V. K. Krishna Menon that, because of his religious inclinations and reduced interest in worldly matters, he was renouncing his throne in favour of his eldest son, Prithvirajsinhji. On 30 January 1948, he abdicated in favour of Prithvirajsinhji, who accordingly succeeded him. Prithvirajsinhji, on 16 October 1948, merged Danta into Bombay, and the following month handed over the administration to the provincial government.

== Personal interests ==
=== Religion ===
He was a deeply religious man. When his father, his first two wives, and two brothers died one after another, he began, in his spare moments, to compose hymns to Ambaji, the tutelary goddess of his family. For his religious devotion, the Varanasi based Great Council of the Hindu Faith named him Ornament of the Hindu Faith in 1934. Following his abdication, he devoted himself to worshipping Ambaji.

=== Scholastic ===
He was elected as a member of the working committee of Mayo College, Ajmer, on 26 August 1937, and was to remain in this office for three years. He was again elected to the office on 26 August 1943, for a further three years.

== Death ==
He died in 1961.

== Honours ==
=== Orders and decorations ===
He was created a Knight Commander of the Order of the Star of India on 2 January 1939.

Country	Year	Honour	Class/Grade	Ribbon	Post-nominal letters
United Kingdom	1939	Order of the Star of India	Knight Commander		KCSI
Danta	1935–36	Order of the Rajya Ratna Mandal	Sovereign		
Danta	1935–36	Order of the Rajyalankar Mandal	Sovereign		
Danta	1935–36	Order of the Gunadarsha Mandal	Sovereign		
