= Ajitsinhji =

Maharana Raj Sahib of Dhrangadhra

Ajitsinhji Jaswantsinhji KCSI
- His Highness; Maharana Raj

Maharana Raj Sahib of Jhalavad
- Reign: 1900– 1911
- Predecessor: Mansinhji II
- Successor: Ghanshyamsinhji
- Born: 18 January 1872; Manmehlat Palace, Dhrangadhra State
- Died: 8 February 1911 (aged 38–39); Arsi Vilas palace, Dhrangadhra State
- Spouse: among others; Sundar kunwarba; Monghi Kunwarba; Har Kunwarba; Hirji Kunwarba; Suraj Kunwarba; Kunvari bai
- Issue Among others: Ghanshyamsinhji
Names
- Ajitsinhji Jaswantsinhji Jhala
- House: Dhrangadhra
- Dynasty: Jhala
- Father: Jaswantsinhji Jhala
- Mother: Mairaj kunwarba of Bhadarwa

HH Maharana Raj Ajitsinhji Jaswantsinhji Sahib Bahadur, KCSI, was the 43rd ruler of Jhalavad from 1900 to 1911. He succeeded his Grandfather Maharana Raj Mansinhji II Sahib Bahadur. Ajit Niwas Palace was built during his reign.

== Early life ==
Ajitsinhji was born on 18 January 1872 at Manmehlat Palace, Dhrangadhra, to Prince Jaswantsinhji, the son of Maharana Raj Sahib Mansinhji II of Dhrangadhra. He was educated at Rajkumar College, Rajkot, and became the heir apparent upon his father's death in 1879.

== Reign ==
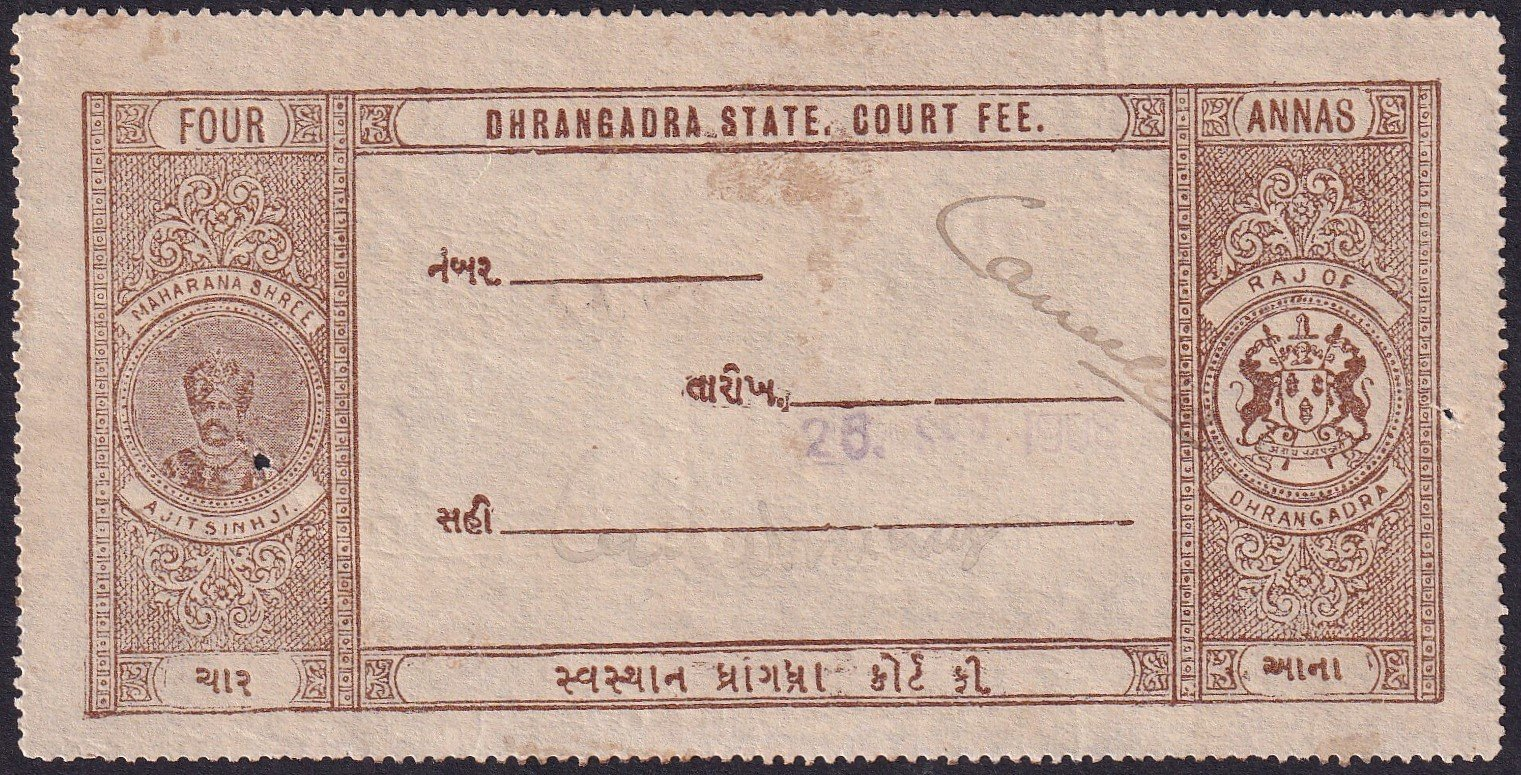
Dhrangadhra state stamp featuring HH Maharana Raj Sahib Ajit Singhji

Ajitsinhji succeeded to the throne upon the death of his grandfather on 2nd December 1900. He ascended the gadi at Amar Mahal, Jhallisvara Vat Palace, Halvad, on 3rd December 1900. He also attended the Delhi Coronation Durbar in 1903. Deeply interested in literature and theatre, he built one of the largest auditoriums in Gujarat, where he wrote and produced his own plays. He reorganized the State military and built good relations with other Rajput states like Kutch, Nawanagar, Jodhpur and Ratlam. He also built the Ajit Niwas Palace.

He was awarded KCSI, Knight Commander of the Star of India on 1 January 1909.

== Death ==
He died at Arsi Vilas, Dhrangadhra on 8 February 1911 due to smallpox. He was succeeded by his son Ghanshyamsinhji.

== Family ==
He had 6 wives and 6 Children: 3 sons and 3 daughters. He also had 2 daughters from a maid.

=== Wives ===
- Jadeja Sundar kunwarba, of Mengni in Nawanagar
- Jadeja Monghi Kunwarba, of Mengni in Nawanagar
- Vaghela Hari Kunwarba of Tharad
- Gohel Hirji Kunwarba of Thimba
- Jadeja Suraj Kunwarba of Nawanagar
- Jadeja Kunvari bai of Rajkot

=== Children ===
- Chatrapalsinhji
- Ghanshyamsinhji
- Prithirajsinhji
- Maya kunwar, married to Prince Man Singh of Pratapgarh
- Pratap kunwar, married to Prince Captain Pratap Singh of Banera in Mewar
- Jayant Kunwar, married to Maharaj Bharat Singh of Multhan

== Titles ==
- 1879-1900: Patvi Namdar Rajkumar Shri Ajitsinhji Jaswantsinhji Sahib, Yuvraj of Dhrangadhra
- 1900-1909: Shri Shaktimant Jhaladipati Mahamandleshwar Maharana Sriraj Sir Ajitsinhji Jaswantwinhji Sahib Bahadur, Maharana Raj Sahib of Dhrangadhra
- 1909-1911: Shri Shaktimant Jhaladipati Mahamandleshwar Maharana Sriraj Sir Ajitsinhji Jaswantwinhji Sahib Bahadur, Maharana Raj Sahib of Dhrangadhra,KCSI

== Awards and honours ==
- Delhi Durbar Gold Medal, 1903
- KCSI: Knight Commander of the Order of the Star of India, 1909

=== List of Eponyms ===
- Ajit Niwas Palace
- Sir Ajitsinhji Highschool
