= Meghrajji III =

Last ruling Maharaja of Dhrangadhra from 1942 to 1971

Mayurdwajsinhji Meghrajsinhji III KCIE FRAS FRAI FRHistS
- His Highness; Maharana Maharaja
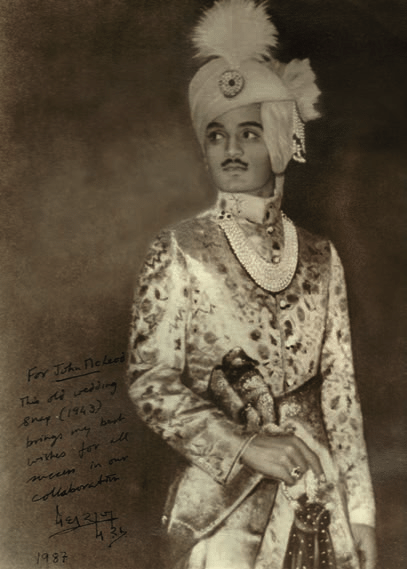
- HH Maharana Mayurdhwajsinhji Meghrajji III

Maharana Maharaja of Jhalavad
- Reign: 1942– 1948
- Predecessor: Ghanshyamsinhji Ajitsinhji
- Successor: Sodhsalsinhji Shatrujitdev (titular Maharana Maharaja of Dhrangadhra)
- Born: 3 March 1923; Sundar Villas Palace, Dhrangadhra State
- Died: 1 August 2010 (aged 87)
- Spouse: Brijraj kunwar Sahiba of Jodhpur
- Issue: Sodhsalsinhji; Jayasinhji; Siddhrajsinhji
Names
- Mayurdwajsinhji Meghrajji III Ghanshyamsinjhi
- House: Dhrangadhra
- Dynasty: Jhala
- Father: Ghanshyamsinhji Bahadur
- Mother: Anand kunwar Sahiba Jadeja of Kotda-Sagani

Uprajpramukh of Saurashtra
- In office 1948 – 1952

Member of Lok Sabha from Surendranagar
- In office 1967 – 1971

HH Major Maharana Maharaja Sir Mayurdwajsinhji Meghrajsinhji III Sahib Bahadur, KCIE, FRAS, FRAI, FRHistS (3 March 1923 – 1 August 2010), popularly known as Meghrajji III was the last ruling Maharaja of Dhrangadhra-Halvad. He was an academic, politician, member of several distinguished academic bodies, and one of the last surviving rulers of the former princely states of the British Raj. He was also the last surviving knight of the Order of the Indian Empire and the last of either of the chivalric orders of the British Indian Empire.

== Names and titles ==
Meghrajji III was officially known as

- 1923-1942: Patvi Namdar Jhalavrit Maharajkumar Shri Meghrajji Ghanshyamsinjhi Sahib, Yuvraj of Dhrangadhra Halvad
- 1942-1947: His Highness Shri Shaktimant Jhaladipati Mahamandleshwar Maharana Sriraj Maharaja Mayurdwajsinhji Meghrajji III Ghanshyamsinjhi Sahib Bahadur, Maharaja Raj Sahib of Dhrangadhra Halvad
- 1947-2010: His Highness Shri Shaktimant Jhaladipati Mahamandleshwar Maharana Sriraj Maharaja Sir Mayurdwajsinhji Meghrajji III Ghanshyamsinjhi Sahib Bahadur, Maharaja Raj Sahib of Dhrangadhra Halvad, KCIE

== Early life ==
Maharaja Meghrajji III was born on 3 March 1923 at Sundar Villas, Dhrangadhra as the second but eldest surviving son of Maharaja Sir Ghanshyamsinjhi Ajitsinhji Sahib Bahadur (1889–1942), the Maharaja of the 13-gun salute state of Dhrangadhra-Halvad and his third wife, Maharani Anand Kunverba Sahiba (1895–1979). He received his earliest education at a local school, then was sent to England, where he first attended Millfield School in Somerset and then the Heath Mount School in Hertfordshire. He then studied at Haileybury College before returning to India just prior to succeeding his father as Maharaja.

== Maharaja of Dhrangadhra-Halvad ==
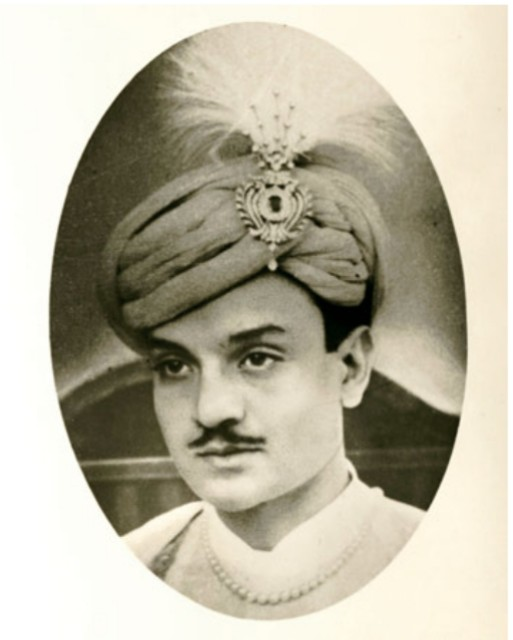
HH Maharaja Maharana Meghrajji III

Upon the death of his father in 1942, Mehghrajji succeeded him as Maharaja. He continued his education at St. Joseph's Academy in Dehra Dun and at the Shivaji Military School in Poona (now Pune). During his reign, he served as the Patron of Talukdari Girassia College and of the Bhandarkar Oriental Research Institute. From 1945 to 1947, he was a member of the Standing Committee of the Chamber of Princes.

Meghrajji's reign proved to be a short one, as when independence came to India in 1947, Meghrajji signed an Instrument of Accession to India. On 14 August, he was knighted by being appointed a Knight Commander of the Order of the Indian Empire (KCIE), one of the last. However, Meghrajji threw himself wholeheartedly into the cause for his new nation, serving as a member of the Constituent Assembly of India from 1947 to 1948. On 15 February 1948, the Maharaja merged Dhrangadhra-Halvad into the United State of Kathiawad and into the Union of Saurashtra just a month later.

== Politician and academic ==
From 1948 to 1952, Meghrajji served as Uprajpramukh (Deputy Rajpramukh) of the state of Saurashtra, also serving briefly (in 1949) as president of its state bank. In 1953, he attended the coronation of Elizabeth II. In 1967, he became a Member of the 4th Lok Sabha, representing Surendranagar, as Member of Parliament from 1967 to 1971. Working to keep the tradition of royal India's monarchies alive, Meghrajji simultaneously held the chair of Intendant-General for the Consultation of Rulers of Indian States in Concord for India until 1971.

In the 1950s, Meghrajji studied at Christ Church, Oxford, where he took a B.Litt degree in 1958. He also studied at the Ruskin School of Drawing and at the Institute for Social Anthropology at Oxford.

== Personal life ==
In 1943, Meghrajji married Maharani Shrimati Sri Rajni Brijraj Kunverba Sahiba of Jodhpur. The couple had three sons:

- Sodhsalji Shatrujitdev Sahib, Yuvaraja of Dhrangadhra-Halvad, who succeeded him to the Maharaja Raj Sahib of Dhrangadhra-Halvad throne
- Dr. Jayasinhji Jawahirdev Sahib
- Siddhrajsinhji Gautama Deo Sahib

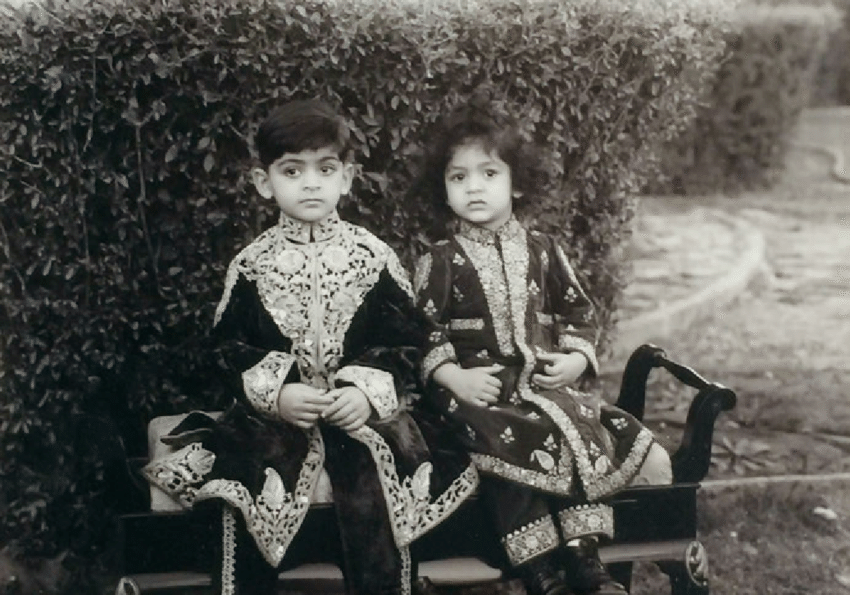
Maharajkumar Jayasinhji and Maharajkumar Siddhrajsinhji, 1954

== Later life ==
Since 1966, he had served as the President of Rajkumar College, Rajkot and of the Sri Rajaram Educational Foundation. He was also a life member of the Millfield Society, the Indian Council of World Affairs, the Indian Parliamentary Group, the Commonwealth Parliamentary Association (all since 1967), the Linguistic Society of India, the Numismatic Society of India, the Heraldry Society of India and the World Wildlife Fund. He was also a Fellow of the Royal Asiatic Society and of the Royal Anthropological Institute of Great Britain and Ireland. Additionally, he was a member of the Cricket Club of India and a Fellow of the Royal Historical Society.

== Death ==
The Maharaja died of complications of old age at Dhrangadhra on 1 August 2010, aged 87. He was succeeded by his eldest son Sodhsalji Shatrujitdev, the heir and titular Maharaja to the throne of Dhrangadhra-Halvad. He was the last surviving member of any grade of the Order of the Indian Empire.

== Awards and honours ==
- King George VI Coronation Medal (1937)
- Knight Commander of the Order of the Indian Empire (KCIE) - 1948 New Year Honours, back-dated to 14 August 1947
- Honorary rank of Major in the Indian Army - 15 August 1948
- Indian Independence Medal (1947)
- Queen Elizabeth II Coronation Medal (1953)
