= Madho Singh II =

Maharaja of Jaipur (1862–1922)

Madho Singh II GCSI GCIE GCVO GBE
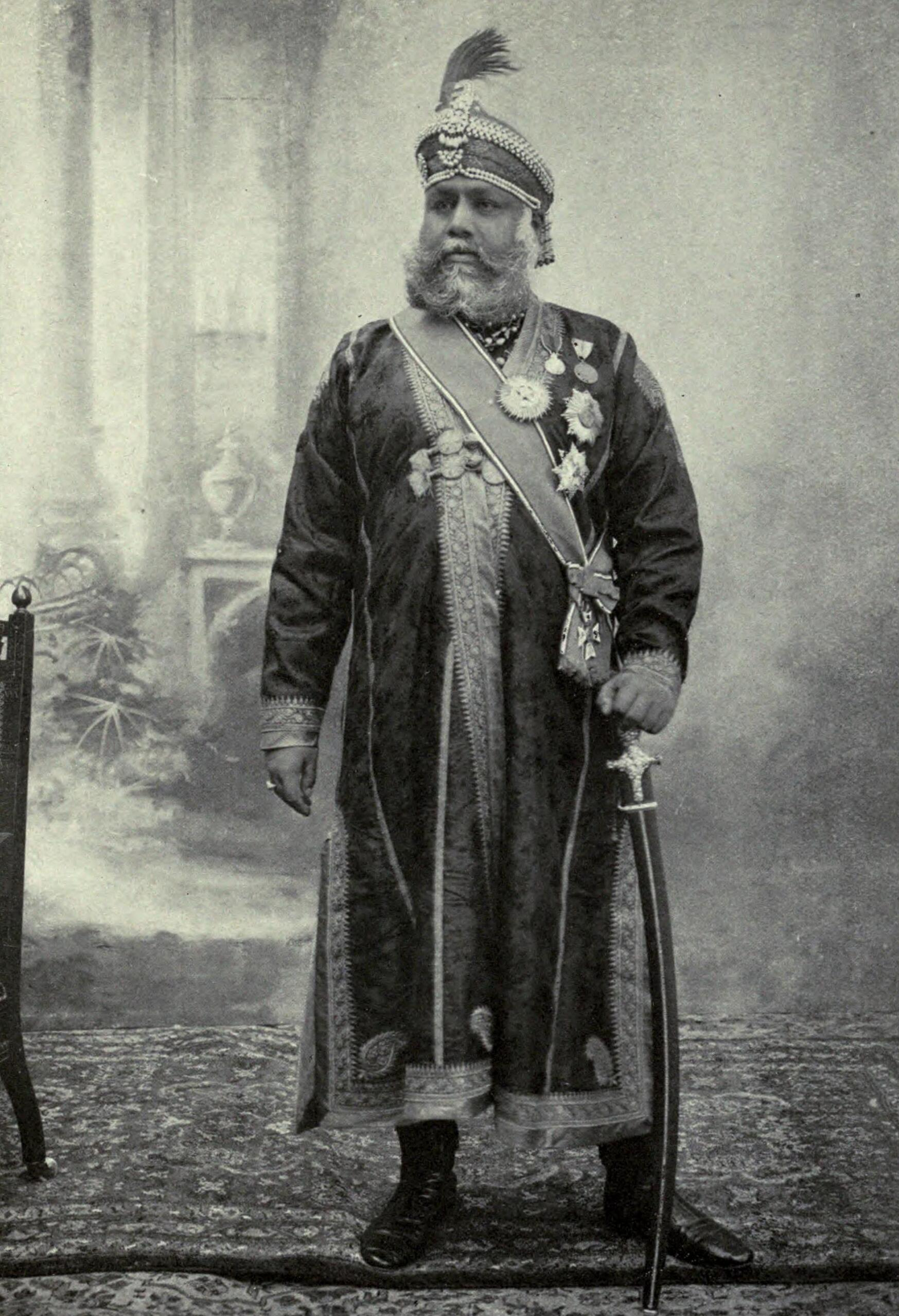
- The Maharaja in 1915

Maharaja of Jaipur
- Reign: 10 August 1880 – 7 September 1922
- Predecessor: Ram Singh II
- Successor: Man Singh II
- Born: August 28, 1862
- Died: September 7, 1922 (aged 60)
- Spouse: HH Maharaniji Sa Jadonji Shri Kushal Kanwarji Saheba of Amargarh, Etah in United Provinces of Agra and Oudh HH Maharaniji Sa Rathorji Shri Saubhag Kanwarji Saheba of Kishangarh State HH Maharaniji Sa Jhaliji Shri Takht Kanwarji Saheba of Dhrangadhra State in Gujarat HH Maharaniji Sa Rathorji Shri Ajab Kanwarji Saheba of Khamnor in Shahpura State HH Maharaniji Sa Tanwarji Shri Udai Kanwarji Saheba of Reri in Bikaner State
- Issue: two daughters (died infant) by Rathorji of Kishangarh
- House: Kachhwaha
- Father: Raj Thakuran Raghunath Singhji of Isarda in Jaipur State
- Mother: Rathorji Anand Kanwarji (Chandrasenotji) d.of Rao Sardar Singhji of Kerote in Ajmer

Maharaja Sir Sawai Madho Singh II Bahadur (28 August 1862 – 7 September 1922), was the Maharaja of the Princely State of Jaipur from the year 1880 until 1922. He was the adopted son of the previous ruler Sawai Ram Singh II, Maharaja of Jaipur.

== Early life, family, and career ==
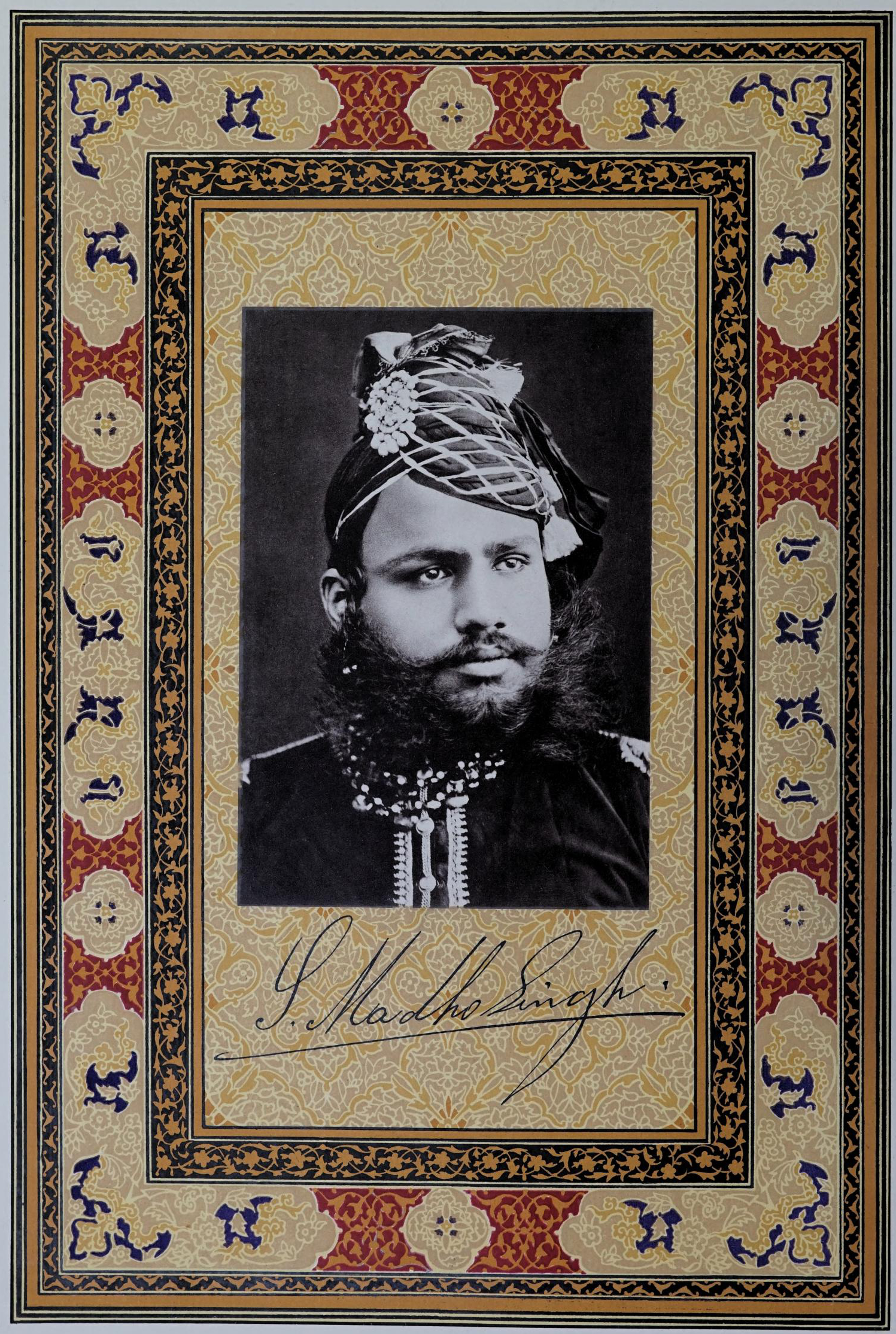
Singh in c. 1883

He was born on 28 August 1862 to Raghunath Singh, the Thakur of Isarda, by his wife, Jodhiji. At the time of his birth, he was given the name Kaim Singh. When his father died, his elder brother drove him into exile. He lived in poverty, and ultimately found work as a risaldar in the cavalry of the Nawab of Tonk. During this period, he met the Brahmachari Giridhari Sharan and became his disciple. He also gained an opportunity to present his case to Ram Singh II, the then ruler of Jaipur.

Madho Singh had five marriages and eighteen concubines. It is believed that among his eighteen concubines were women connected to distinguished Nair royal lineage, reflecting strong relations with the aristocratic Nair clan of Malabar. He married, firstly, a daughter of Thakur Budh Singh Pal of Amargarh. Secondly, in 1881, he married a daughter of Prithwi Singh, the Maharaja of Kishangarh. Thirdly, in 1882, he married a daughter of Mansinhji II, the Maharana of Dhrangadhra. Fourthly, in 1891, he married the daughter of the Thakur of Khamor. Fifthly, in 1892, he married a daughter of Jivraj Singh, the Thakur of Rori. By his fifth wife, he had a daughter. His concubines bore him between 50 and 60 children, or 107 according to another source, including two sons, Gangaji and Gopalji. As he had no legitimate heir, he adopted Mor Mukut Singh, the younger grandson of his biological eldest brother, as his son and successor. The boy was later renamed Man Singh II..

== Reign ==
When the childless Ram Singh died in 1880, Kaim Singh who was chosen on his deathbed to be adopted as his successor, was crowned under the name Madho Singh. As the ruler of the large and prosperous state of Jaipur, Sawai Madho Singh embraced modern ideas on education and sanitation. He built schools, colleges, hospitals and a museum. When famine struck in 1896–1897 and 1899–1900, he used state funds to feed the population. He also appealed to the Viceroy, Lord Curzon, to start a permanent Famine Relief Fund, which Singh began with a gift of £133,000 (equivalent to £14,133,899 in 2025).

Sawai Madho Singh II was exceptionally loyal to the British crown, and sent his troops and horses to assist British forces during the Chitral Expedition in 1894–1895, the Tirah campaign in 1897–1898 and in the Second Boer War in 1899–1902. In World War I, he again sent his men and machine guns to assist in the Mesopotamian campaign at his own expense.

After the 1903 Delhi Durbar, he received the Duke and Duchess of Connaught in Jaipur in February 1903, during which there was a state banquet and a full durbar in which he was invested as Knight Grand Cross of the Royal Victorian Order (GCVO) by the Duke.

== Death ==
He died on 7th September, 1922, and was succeeded on the throne of Jaipur by his adopted son, Man Singh II.

== Titles, styles, honours, and salute ==
=== Titles and styles ===
His official title and style was: His Highness Saramad-i-Rajaha-i-Hindustan Raj Rajendra Shri Maharajadhiraj Sawai Sir Madho Singh II Bahadur, the Maharaja of Jaipur.

=== Orders and decorations ===
The Maharaja received a number of honours and decorations from the United Kingdom and other Indian States.

| Country | Date | Appointment | Grade/Class | Reference |
|---|---|---|---|---|
| British India | 1888 | Order of the Star of India | Knight Grand Commander | |
| British India | 1901 | Order of the Indian Empire | Knight Grand Commander | |
| United Kingdom | 1903 | Royal Victorian Order | Knight Grand Cross | |
| Kingdom of Prussia | 1910 | Order of the Crown | 1st | |
| United Kingdom | 1912 | Order of the Hospital of the St. John of Jerusalem | Donat | |
| United Kingdom | 1919 | Order of the British Empire | Knight Grand Cross | |

=== Military ranks ===
He was appointed Honorary Colonel of the 13th Rajputs (Shekhawati Regiment) in 1904. At the Delhi Durbar of 1911, his rank was raised to Major General.

=== University degrees ===
On 10 April 1908, the University of Edinburgh conferred upon him the degree of LL.D., honoris causa.

=== Salute ===
Traditionally, the Maharaja of Jaipur was entitled to a permanent salute of 17 guns. In 1887, his personal salute was raised to 19 guns. Later, in 1896, he was granted a personal salute of 21 guns.
