= Danta State =

Princely state of India

Coordinates: 24°12′11″N 72°44′41″E

Danta State દાંતા રિયાસત
- 1061–1948
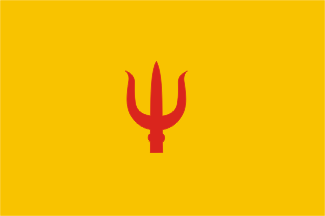
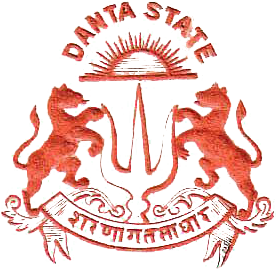
- Flag Coat of arms
- History
  - Established: 1061
  - Independence of India: 1948

Area
- 1901: 898.73 km^{2} (347.00 sq mi)

Population
  - 1901: 18,000
| Succeeded by |
| India |

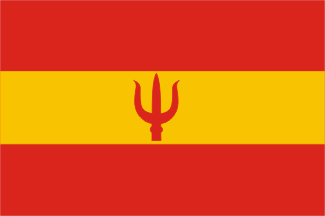
Royal Standard of the rana of Danta

The Danta State was a sovereign state that was established in 1061 and lasted until its merger with the Indian Republic in 1948. It was located in what is now Banaskantha district of Gujarat, India.

== Rulers ==
The Maharana of Danta claims descent from Vikramaditya and belongs to the Parmar clan of Rajputs of the Agnivansh. He is the head of that clan. The Maharana was entitled to a dynastic salute of 9 guns, and succession to the throne of Danta followed the rule of primogeniture. The Maharana had the power to try all offences and all persons, except British subjects, whose cases required the sanction of the political agent. In civil cases, he exercised jurisdiction up to a value of Rs. 20,000. In criminal cases, he had full powers, except that a sentence of death required the confirmation of the political agent.

| Name | Reign | Note(s) | Reference(s) |
|---|---|---|---|
| Jasraji | | | |
| Kedarsinhji | | | |
| Jaspalji | | | |
| Jagatpaji | | | |
| Kanardevji | | | |
| Askaranji | | He gave refuge to Salim when the latter was fleeing from Akbar. When father and son reconciled, Akbar granted Askaranji the title of Maharana and sent him a robe of honour, while Salim sent him a jeweled signed ring. | |
| Vaghji | | | |
| Jaimalji | | | |
| Jethmalji | | | |
| Punjaji | | | |
| Man Sinhji | | | |
| Gaj Sinhji | | | |
| Prithvi Sinhji | | | |
| Vikram Sinhji | | | |
| Karan Sinhji | | | |
| Ratan Sinhji | | | |
| Abhai Sinhji | | | |
| Man Sinhji II | | | |
| Jagat Sinhji | 1800–1823 | | |
| Nahar Sinhji | 1823–1847 | | |
| Zalim Sinhji | 1847–1859 | | |
| Sardar Sinhji | 1859–1860 | | |
| Hari Sinhji | 1860–1876 | | |
| Jaswant Sinhji | 1876–1908 | | |
| Hamir Sinhji | 1908–1925 | | |
| Bhawani Sinhji | 1925–1948 | | |
| Prithviraj Sinhji | 1948–1989 | | |
Pretender
| Mahipendra Sinhji | 1989–2023 | | |
| Riddhiraj Sinhji | 2023–present | | |
