= Mansinhji II =

Maharana Raj Sahib of Dhrangadhra

Mansinhji II KCSI
- His Highness; Maharana Raj
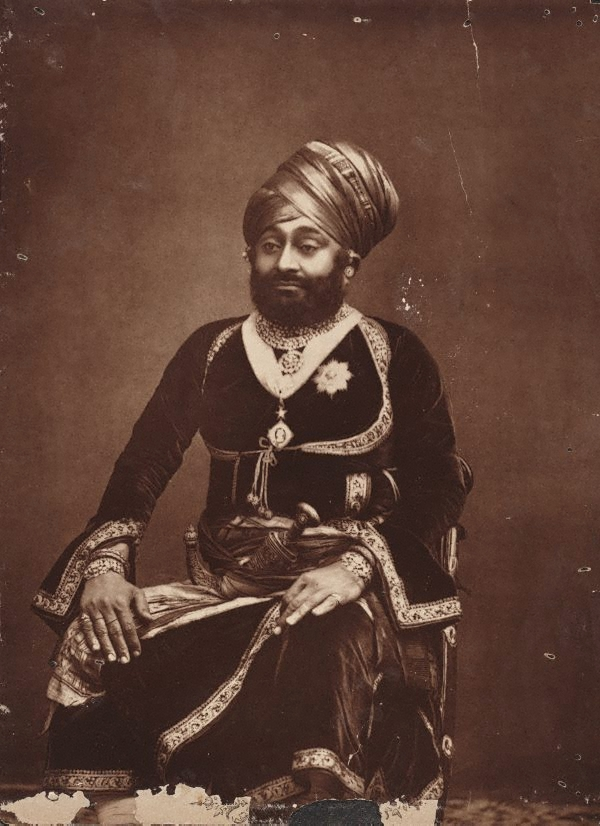
- HH Maharana Raj Mansinhji II Sahib

Maharana Raj Sahib of Jhalavad
- Reign: 1869-1900
- Predecessor: Ranmalsinhji II
- Successor: Ajitsinhji
- Born: 11 January 1837; Manmehlat Palace, Dhrangadhra State
- Died: 2 December 1900 (aged 62–63); Manmehlat Palace, Dhrangadhra State
- Spouse: Details; Vaghela Rupali Kuwarba; Jadeja Jiji Kunwarba; Gohil Kasi Kunwarba; Gohil Kesaba kunwarba; Chauhan Hamji kunwarba
- Issue Among 6 others: Jaswantsinhji; Sajjansinhji
Names
- Mansinhji II Ranmalsinhji Jhala
- House: Dhrangadhra
- Dynasty: Jhala
- Father: Ranmalsinhji II
- Mother: Bairaj kunwarba Jadeja of Nawanagar

HH Maharana Raj Mansinhji II Ranmalsinhji Sahib Bahadur, KCSI, was the 42nd ruler of Jhalavad from 1869 to 1900. He was granted a personal salute of 15-guns during his reign. He was succeeded by his grandson Ajitsinhji.

== Biography ==
=== Early life ===
He was born on 11 January 1837 at Manmehalat Palace, Dhrangadhra to Maharana Ranmalsinhji II and Maharani Bairaj kunwarba.

=== Reign ===
He succeeded his father Ranmalsinhji II on 28 October 1869 at Jhallesvar Vat Palace, Halvad. He was promoted to personal salute of 15-guns and was awarded KCSI on 1 January 1877 at the Delhi Durbar of 1877. He received a Sanad of adoption in 1890.

He extended education facilities, improved the transport infrastructure, reformed the revenue assessments and building hospitals. He built the first girls school and an English school in Dhrangadhra and many Gujarati schools in villages nearby. He also built Prince of Wales Hospital in Dhrangadhra.

=== Death and succession ===
He died on 2 December 1900, succeeded by his grandson Ajitsinhji.

== Family ==
He had 5 wives and 6 Children: 3 sons and 3 daughters.

=== Wives ===
- Rupali Kuwarba Vaghela, daughter of Thakore Jalamsinhji of Bhadarwa
- Jiji Kunwarba Jadeja, daughter of Sangaji Sahib of Khijdia, in Dhrol state
- Kasi Kunwarba Gohil, daughter of Thakore Shri Pratapsinhji of Palitana State
- Kesaba kunwarba Gohil, daughter of Thakore Shri Sursinhji Pratapsinhji of Palitana State
- Hamji kunwarba Chauhan of Chhota Udaipur State

=== Children ===
- Jaswantsinhji, Ajitsinhji's father
- Sajjansinhji
- Natwarsinhji
- Raj Kunwarba, married to HH Maharaja Ranjit Singh of Ratlam
- Takht Kunwarba, married to HH Maharaja Madho Singh II of Jaipur
- Gulab Kunwarba, married to HH Maharawal Shalivahan Singh of Jaisalmer

== Titles ==
- 1837-1869: Patvi Namdar Rajkumar Shri Mansinhji II Ranmalsinhji Sahib, Yuvraj of Dhrangadhra
- 1869-1877: Shri Shaktimant Jhaladipati Mahamandleshwar Maharana Sriraj Sir Mansinhji II Ranmalsinhji Sahib Bahadur, Maharana Raj Sahib of Dhrangadhra
- 1877-1900: Shri Shaktimant Jhaladipati Mahamandleshwar Maharana Sriraj Sir Mansinhji II Ranmalsinhji Sahib Bahadur, Maharana Raj Sahib of Dhrangadhra,KCSI

== Awards and honours ==
- Prince of Wales Medal, 1875
- KCSI: Knight Commander of the Order of the Star of India, 1877
- KIH: Kaisar-i-Hind Gold Medal, 1877
