= Natrayat Rajputs =

Rajput caste in Rajasthan and Gujarat

The Natrayat Rajput is a Hindu caste directly descended from the Rajputs who took up the practice of widow remarriage and eventually developed into a separate caste. They are mainly found in the states of Rajasthan and Gujarat in India.

== History and origin ==
The community derives its name from the word nata, which means widow remarriage in Hindi. This practice, initially adopted by a group of Chauhan Rajputs changing their surnames from Chouhan To Chadana in Marwar, Rajasthan, and this led to their separation from the wider Rajput community, which disallows widow remarriage. The community also include a small number Panwar, Parihar and Rathore. The Natrayat are distributed in the transitional zone between Mewar and Marwar, occupying several villages in this hilly region.

== Present circumstances ==
The community is endogamous, and divided into exogamous gotras such as Chadana, Unthed, Solanki, Rathore, Sisodiya, Parmar (Pawar), Mundawat, Tomar (Tanwar), etc. They are mainly a community of small peasants farmers.

== See also ==
- Lok Rajput
