= Lok Rajputs =

Caste of the Hindu Caste system

The Lok Rajputs are Hindu caste found in the state of Rajasthan in India.

== History and origin ==
The Lok Rajput claims to descent from a small number of Panwar Rajputs that settled in the hill of Mount Abu. Owing to their isolation from Rajput groups, they evolved into a distinct community.

== Present circumstances ==
The community is endogamous, and divided into fourteen exogamous gotras. These are involved in the regulating of marriages. They are a community of mainly small peasant farmers, with animal husbandry being their main secondly occupation.

== See also ==
- Natrayat Rajput
- Rajput
