= Ranmalsinhji II =

Ruler of Jhalavad from 1843 to 1869

Ranmalsinhji II KCSI
- His Highness; Maharana Raj
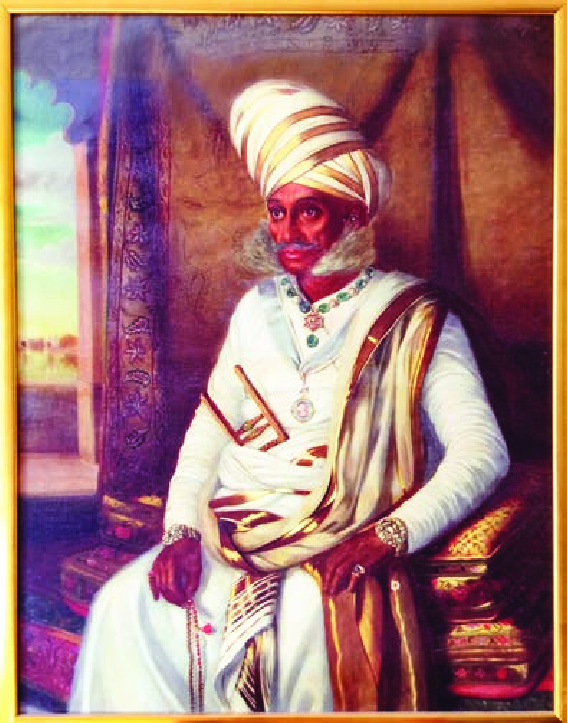
- HH Maharana Raj Ranmalsinhji II Sahib

Maharana Raj Sahib of Jhalavad
- Reign: 1843-1869
- Predecessor: Amarsinhji
- Successor: Mansinhji II
- Born: 20 July 1809; Manmehlat Palace, Dhrangadhra State
- Died: 16 October 1869 (aged 59–60); Manmehlat Palace, Dhrangadhra State
- Spouse: Jan kunwarba Jadeja of Rajkot; Sundar Kuwarba Jadeja of Gondal; Brijkuwar Jadeja of Sarodar
- Issue: Mansinhji II and 7 others
Names
- Ranmalsinhji II Amarsinhji Jhala
- House: Dhrangadhra
- Dynasty: Jhala
- Father: Amarsinhji
- Mother: Dev kunwarba Vaghela of Gangad

HH Maharana Raj Ranmalsinhji II Amarsinhji Sahib Bahadur, KCSI, was the 41st ruler of Jhalavad from 1843 to 1869. He was the first person in Kathiawar to become Knight Commander of the Star of India.

== Biography ==
=== Early life ===
Ranmalsinhji II was born to Maharana Raj Amarsinhji and his wife Dev Kunvarba. Ranmalsinhji was a scholar in Urdu, Persian, Gujarati and Sanskrit languages.

=== Reign ===
Ranmalsinhji succeeded his father on 9 April 1843. He repaired the fort of Dhrangadhra, built new forts at Sitha and Umrada. He rebuilt the fort of Halvad, Ranmalsar tank at Dhrangadhra. Ranmalsinhji was fond of hunting, he hunted lions until they went extinct in Dhrangadhra. He was made Knight Commander of the Star of India on December 26 1886.

=== Death and succession ===
He died on 16 October 1869, succeeded by his son Mansinhji II.

== Family ==
He had 3 wives and 8 children: 5 sons and 3 daughters.

=== Wives ===
- Jankunvarba or Bai Saheba I, daughter of Ranmalji Jadeja II, Thakor Saheb of Rajkot
- Sundarkunvarba or Bai Saheba II, daughter of Nathaji Jadeja, Thakor Saheb of Gondal
- Birjakunvarba, Bairajba, or Vrijrajkunvarba, daughter of Raidharji Jadeja of Sarodar

=== Children ===
- Mansinhji II
- Merasinhji
- Harisinhji
- Pratapsinhji
- Raghunathsinhji
- Ucchab Kunwarba, married to Ravaji Jadeja of Kutch
- Jeev Kunwarba, married to Javansinhji Rathor, Maharaja of Idar
- Krishna Kunwarba, married to Maharao Pragmalji Jadeja II of Kutch

== Awards and honours ==
- KCSI: Knight Commander of the Order of the Star of India, 1866
