= Scott College, Sadra =

Defunct school in Sadra

- Sadra, Gandhinagar, Gujarat; India

Information
- Funding type: Private
- Established: 16 December 1887
- Closed: c. 1934
- Gender: Boys

Scott College was a private boarding school located in Sadra, Gujarat, India.

== History ==
In 1885, Colonel W. Scott, the then Political Agent of Mahi Kantha, who was dissatisfied with the quality of education being provided at the taluqdari school, proposed to the rulers, chiefs, and nobles of the agency to donate towards building a school at Sadra for the education of their sons, on the lines of an English public school. Generously responding to his call, they contributed a sum of nearly Rs. 75,000, of which Rs. 30,000 was invested in Government Promissory Notes to form the nucleus of an endowment fund for the school, and the remainder was used to construct the building. In appreciation of Scott, who had been instrumental in founding the school, and at the request of the rulers, chiefs, and nobles of the agency to the Government of India, the school was named after him. The foundation stone of the school building was laid by Scott himself on 6 November 1886, and the completed building, which was to be opened by the Governor of Bombay, was, due to the Governor's unavailability, opened by J. B. Richey, a member of the Bombay Council, on 16 December 1887.

It was amalgamated with the Rajkumar College, Rajkot, in 1934.

== Alumni ==
The following are some of the school's alumni.

Name	Father Name	State/Esate	Note(s)	Reference
Viramji	Kanji	Deodar		
Keshrisinghji		Ambliara		
Fatehsinhji		Ghodasar		
Fatehsinhji		Khadal		
Fatehsinhji		Pethapur		
Shivsinhji		Punadra		
Prithisinhji		Sudasna		
Hamirsinhji		Vijaynagar		
Ajitsinhji		Punadra		
Bapusinhji		Vasna		
Joravarsinhji		Varsoda	While he was at Sadra, he attained first rank in his class and in the whole college in English, and obtained the Ferris Medal for proficiency in English. He was then admitted to Mayo College, Ajmer.	
Shivsinhji		Ilol	He studied at the college for seven years and then went to England for higher education.	

== See also ==
- Rajkumar College, Rajkot
