= Shri Shivaji Preparatory Military School (Pune) =

Military school in Pune, India

Coordinates: 18.5270°N 73.8531°E

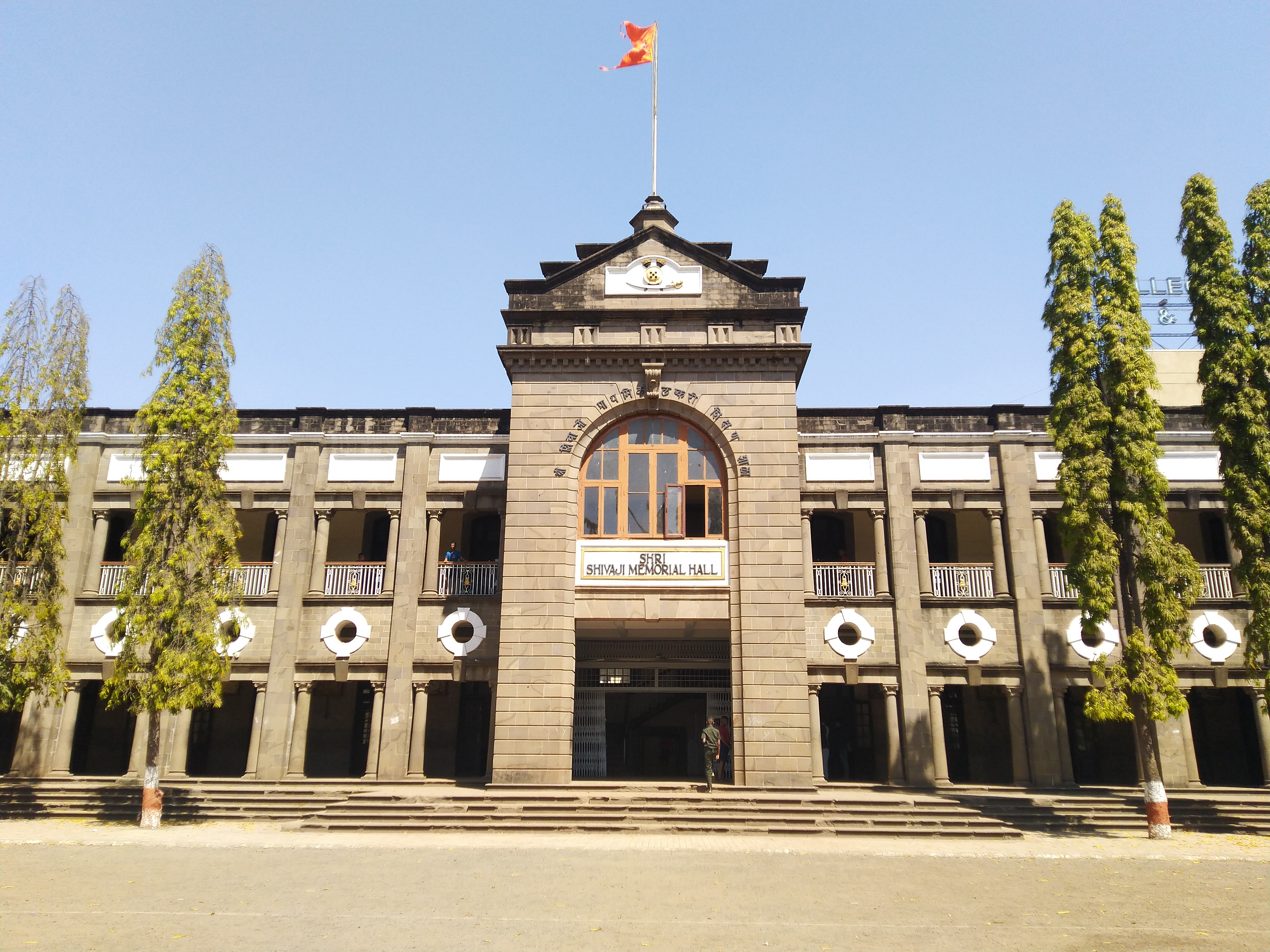

Location
- Shivajinagar; Pune, Maharashtra; India

Shri Shivaji Preparatory Military School, Pune is a military boarding school in the heart of Pune city in India. In 1932, Rajaram III, the Maharaja of Kolhapur decided to use The Chhatrapati Shivaji Memorial Hall in Pune for the military school. The land of Shri Shivaji Preparatory Military School was donated by Shiledar Shirole (Patil) family who was one of the founding members of this school. The classes were started on 20 June 1932.

Boys of age 4–5 and 9–10 are admitted to the school. The school also allocates students of classes 1st to 4th and 5th to 10th in different buildings on the premises. An entrance test is held annually in April/ May for the academic session starting in June. The school shares its campus with The AISSMS College of Hotel Management and Catering Technology (HMCT). A girl's hostel for college-going girls aptly named The Jijamata Girl's Hostel and mess is placed near the college.

It is a preparatory school for those desiring to join the National Defence Academy (India) due to it being one of the oldest military boarding schools in India.

== Notable alumni ==
- Pratapsingh Raoji Rane – Chief Minister of Goa
- Harshavardhan Patil – Cabinet Minister, Maharshtra
- Chandu Borde – Ex- Chairman, Selection Committee, BCCI
- Parikshit Sahni – Film & TV Actor
- Ritesh Deshmukh – Film Actor
- Sunil Manchanda – Advertisement Producer
- Meghrajji III – the Maharaja of Dhangandhra-Halvad
- Farokh Engineer – Former Indian Test Cricketer
- Madhusudan Rege – Former Indian Test Cricketer

== See also ==
- List of schools in Pune
