= Indian People's Famine Trust =

Famine Relief Fund

- Formation: 25 July 1900; 125 years ago

The Indian People's Famine Trust is an India-based relief fund, founded in 1900 by Madho Singh II, the Maharaja of Jaipur, to help aid Indians in combating calamities such as famine.

== History ==
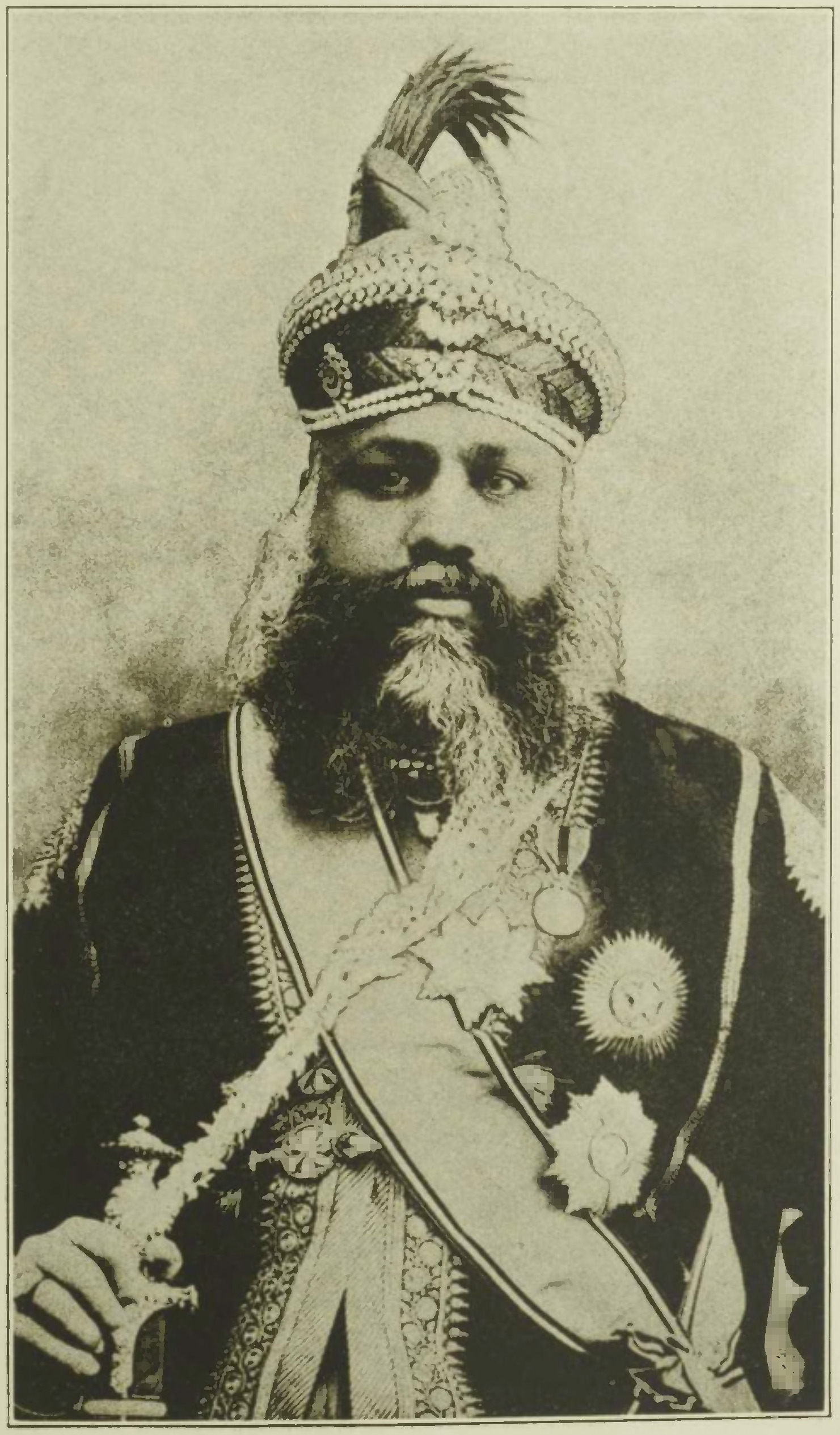
Madho Singh II

In 1899–1900, much of India, including Western India and Central India, was afflicted by a terrible famine, and the State of Jaipur also suffered from it. Madho Singh II, the then ruler of Jaipur, undertook energetic and effective measures to deal with it. He initiated various relief works, chiefly irrigation projects. He also spent about Rs. 5,000,000 for constructing bunds and dams at various places, for cutting canals, and to provide work to the labourers and poor classes. He spent Rs. 1,900,000 to relieve 20,000,000 people, and another Rs. 100,000 in the villages and poor houses of his dominions, which helped save nearly 1,500,000 lives. He threw open the forests of Jaipur for free grazing, and permitted people to remove and sell grass and firewood. He also remitted land revenue amounting to nearly Rs. 1,200,000, and gave his subjects money free of cost to enable them to carry on cultivation of crops.

Seeing the devastating effects and suffering caused by the famine of 1899–1900 throughout India, he realised the necessity and importance of having funds in advance to mitigate and relieve the suffering of the people promptly, should such circumstances ever occur. Realising this, he laid the idea of founding a permanent, all-India Famine Fund before Lord Curzon, the then Viceroy and Governor-General of India, who approved of it. Madho Singh II initially endowed Rs. 16,00,000 towards the establishment of the fund, but later increased it to Rs. 25,00,000. These contributions of his, paid between 1900 and 1906, formed the fund's kernel, and the interest on them was to be available for helping famine‑stricken people in any part of India. The fund was established on 25 July 1900 under the Charitable Endowments Act, 1890 (VI of 1890), by the Governor‑General in Council, and came to be known as the Indian People's Famine Trust. The senior wife of Madho Singh II, Jadonji, contributed to the fund twice: firstly, in 1903, she gave Rs. 100,000, and later, she gave another Rs. 100,000 when the then Princess of Wales paid a visit to Jaipur. The Nawab of Bahawalpur, Bahawal Khan V, also contributed no less than Rs. 300,000 to the fund.

Contributions of Madho Singh to the Fund
No.	Year	Amount	Reference
1	1900	Rs. 16,00,000	
2	1901	Rs. 4,00,000	
3	1904	Rs. 1,00,000	
4	1906	Rs. 4,00,00	
Total		Rs. 25,00,000	

By the agreement reached between India and Pakistan in Karachi on 12 June 1955, following the discussion of the Indo-Pakistan Financial Conference on 10 June and 11 June 1955, it was agreed that the assets of the fund were to be divided between the two countries in the ratio of 82½ : 17½ respectively.

== Purpose ==
The original purpose of the Indian People's Famine Trust was the alleviation, by grants of money or otherwise, of general distress caused by failure or destruction of crops, or by any calamity of a like nature, either in British India or in any Native States.
