= Ambaji Mata Temple =

Hindu temple and Shakta pitha in Gujarat, India

- અરાસુરી અંબા માતા મંદિર
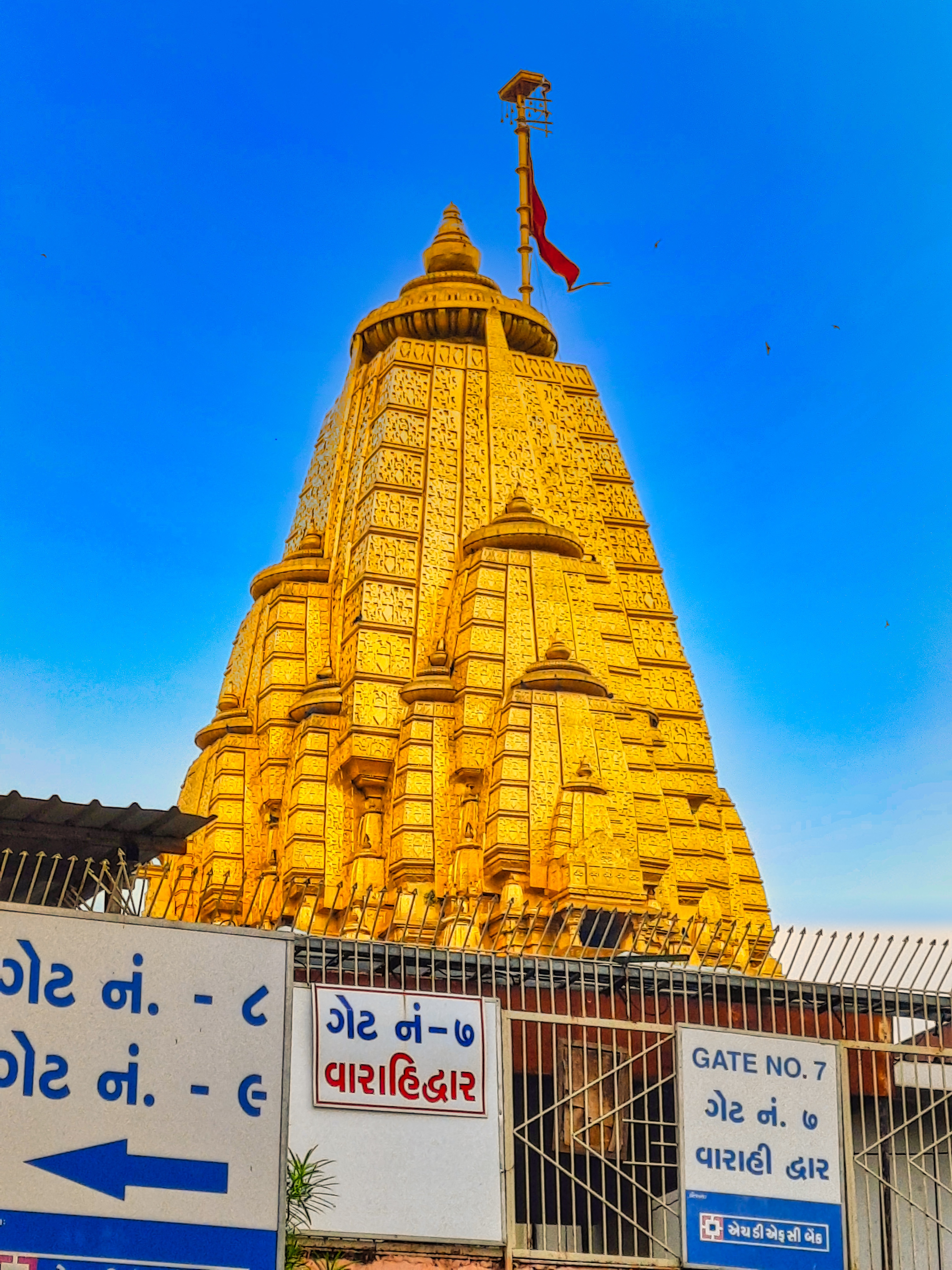
- Ambaji Mata Temple

- Location in Gujarat

Religion
- Affiliation: Hinduism
- District: Banaskantha district
- Deity: Shakti (Arasuri Amba)

Location
- Location: Ambaji
- State: Gujarat
- Country: India
- Coordinates: 24.33°N 72.85°E

Architecture
- Type: White marble with gold-plated spire
- Elevation: 480 m (1,575 ft)

Website
- ambajitemple.in

The Ambaji Mata Temple (historically known as the Arasuri Amba Mandir) is a major Hindu temple complex situated in the town of Ambaji within the Banaskantha district of Gujarat, India. Located at an elevation of 480 meters on the Arasur ridge at the southwestern terminus of the Aravalli Range, near the seasonal headwaters of the historic Saraswati River, the temple is venerated as one of the primary Shakta pithas in Shaktism.

Unlike the majority of North Indian Hindu shrines, the garbhagriha (inner sanctum) contains no anthropomorphic murti. Worship is centered on the Viśo Yantra (or Shree Visa Yantra), a geometric sacred diagram inscribed on an embossed gilded plate mounted within a wall niche (gokh). The plate is screened from direct view and is draped daily in elaborate garments, crowns, and jewelry (śṛṅgāra) to create the visual silhouette of an enthroned goddess.

== Etymology and Epithets ==
The presiding deity is venerated as Ambājī, an honorific compounding of the Sanskrit Ambā (अम्बा, "Mother" or "Consort of Shiva") with the Gujarati-Hindi respectful suffix -jī. In classical Sanskrit literature, the deity is identified with Ambikā (अम्बिका, "the gentle mother"), an epithet first attested in the Yajurveda and later popularized in the 6th-century Devi Mahatmya as an autonomous cosmic protectress..

The regional title Arāsurī (અરાસુરી) is a toponym derived from the surrounding Arasur Hills, a rugged spur of the southern Aravalli range. Local folklore preserves an originative tale claiming that the deity vanquished a demon named Ārasura, historical and linguistic records connect the epithet to the regional white marble quarries (Gujarati: āras) that have characterized the local economy and architecture since the medieval era.

== Sacred geography ==
According to the Shakta tale of the Shakta pithas documented in medieval texts like the Devi-Bhagavata Purana and the Pīṭhanirṇaya, sacred shrines emerged across the subcontinent wherever the dismembered limbs of Sati fell following the disruption of Dakṣa's sacrifice. Within the regional classification of the fifty-one primary seats, Ambaji is venerated as the Hṛdaya Pīṭha—the sanctified site where Sati's heart (hṛdaya) descended to earth, guarded by Batuk Bhairav.

Located 4.5 kilometres (2.8 mi) southwest of the town, Gabbar Hill (Gabbargadh) is venerated as the mula pitha (primordial seat) of the goddess. According to local lore, goddess Ambā agreed to follow a King of Danta down toward the foothills of the hill on the condition that he never look back; when he turned around after her ankle-bells fell silent in the sand, she halted permanently at the site of the modern town temple. The hilltop cavern shrine houses sacred footprints (caraṇ-pādukā) and an eternal flame, reached via 999 steps or an aerial ropeway.

The Arasur hills occupy a key place in regional sacred geography as the traditional source of the Saraswati River. The Skanda Purana records that after disappearing underground at Kurukshetra, the river re-emerges near Mount Abu and the Arasur ridge before descending toward the sea, linking the sanctuary of Ambā into pan-Indian riverine cosmology.

== History and royal patronage ==
Archaeological and architectural evidence in the surrounding Banaskantha region indicates that the Arasur pass was integrated into regional trade and pilgrimage routes by the 10th to 13th centuries CE, coinciding with the rule of the Chaulukya (Solanki) dynasty. The area developed as a major centre of stone-quarrying, supplying fine white marble for the Māru-Gurjara monuments of Western India, including the nearby 11th-century Kumbhariya Jain temples and the Dilwara Temples of Mount Abu. Inscriptions across Patan, Mount Abu, and Danta record royal endowments for rest-houses (dharmashalas) and rituals, establishing the shrine as an important transit node between northern Gujarat and Mewar.

From the 14th century until the accession of princely states in 1948, the hereditary servitorship of the sanctuary was held by the Parmar Rajputs of Danta State, who venerated Arasuri Amba as their primary lineage deity (kuldevi). The Maharajas of Danta maintained hereditary rights (bāridāri) over shrine administration, financing maintenance, patronizing Nagar Brahmin liturgists, and leading Navratri court processions. In regional Rajput tradition, the Goddess was venerated as the source of martial power (śakti) and territorial legitimacy for the ruling house.

Post 1947, the shrine was reconstructed in white marble to withstand weathering in the hill climate. Between 2010 and 2018, the Shri Arasuri Ambaji Mata Devasthan Trust completed a major gilding of the 103-foot-high shikhara (central spire), overlaying it with more than 140 kilograms of donated gold and gold-plating over 350 kalash (finials).

== Temple architecture and layout ==
=== Structural plan ===
The temple is built in the Western Indian Māru-Gurjara style of Nagara architecture. Standing on an elevated plinth (pitha), the layout follows a linear axis:

- Garbhagriha: The square, windowless sanctum housing the sacred niche (gokh) where the yantra is enshrined.
- Gūḍhamaṇḍapa: A domed hypostyle assembly hall supported by carved marble pillars displaying celestial dancers and friezes.
- Nṛtyamaṇḍapa: An outer columned pavilion accommodating queuing pilgrims entering from the main gates.
- Chachar Chowk: A vast, open courtyard paved in polished white marble surrounding the central sanctuary, serving as the setting for communal fire rituals (havans), circumambulation (pradakṣiṇā), and festival dances.

=== The Viśo Yantra and sacred ornamentation ===
The primary devotional feature of Ambaji is its strict aniconism: no sculpted statue of the goddess exists in the inner shrine. Worship is centered on the Viśo Yantra, a geometric diagram embossed on a convex brass-and-copper plate. The yantra features interlocking triangles enclosed by fifty-one sacred syllable letters (bījākṣaras), corresponding to the fifty-one classical Shakta pithas.

By long-standing custom, the yantra is installed in a silver-plated niche and kept behind a silk curtain, hidden from public view. Officiating priests blindfold their eyes while bathing and consecrating the plate. Through daily ornamentation (śṛṅgāra), silken robes, flower garlands, jewelry, and a silver mask are placed over the niche, giving worshipers the visual impression of an eight-armed goddess seated on a lion despite the lack of a sculpted icon.

== Theological significance ==
In the study of Hindu ritual, the presence of the Viśo Yantra is analyzed as an expression of esoteric Śākta theology. Regional goddess traditions encompass diverse forms of divine manifestation, from uncarved stones (piṇḍīs) and flames (jyots) to geometric yantras.

In Śākta metaphysics, geometric diagrams represent the "subtle body" (sūkṣma rūpa) of the divine, whereas statues represent the "gross body" (sthūla rūpa). By directing worship to the yantra, Ambaji preserves the theological concept that the ultimate reality of the Goddess is formless consciousness (cit-śakti) and primordial cosmic matter (prakṛti).

Unlike goddesses whose roles in classical texts are defined primarily by marriage to a dominant male deity (such as Lakshmi to Vishnu, or Parvati to Shiva), Arasuri Amba is venerated as an independent, unconsorted deity.

In the Devi Mahatmya, unconsorted goddesses embody self-sufficient martial heroism (virya), sublating the combined energies of the male pantheon to combat cosmic disorder. At Ambaji, male deities like Batuk Bhairav, Ganesha, and Hanuman appear exclusively in peripheral shrines as subordinate gatekeepers (dvārpalas).

== Worship, festivals, and pilgrimage ==
=== Daily liturgy ===
The temple observes a structured daily timetable consisting of five primary artis:

Daily Worship Timetable at Ambaji
Time	Service	Description
07:00–07:30	Maṅgalā Āratī	Morning awakening ritual; opening of the inner sanctum and lighting of ghee lamps.
07:30–11:30	Śṛṅgāra Darśana	Morning public viewing; the deity is adorned in silken vestments and floral garlands.
12:00–12:30	Rājbhog	Midday food offering presented in seclusion; traditional sweets (mohanthal) are consecrated.
15:30–18:00	Aparāhna Darśana	Afternoon public viewing period following midday rest.
19:00–19:45	Sandhyā Āratī	Twilight lamp-offering accompanied by the sounding of drums, bells, and conches.
21:00	Śayana Āratī	Night retirement service; sanctum doors are sealed until dawn.

=== Bhadarvi Poonam Fair ===
The demographic and devotional peak of the pilgrimage year is the Bhadarvi Poonam Fair, held annually over five to seven days leading to the full-moon day (pūrṇimā) of the Hindu calendar month of Bhadrapada (September). The fair regularly attracts between 1.5 and 2.5 million pilgrims from across western India, during which the town of Ambaji is elaborately illuminated, resembling Diwali.

A defining hallmark of the festival is the practice of padayātrā, with large numbers of devotees traveling hundreds of kilometers on foot across highway corridors from Gujarat, Rajasthan, and Maharashtra. Pilgrims organise into travelling community cohorts called sanghs, supported along the route by volunteer-run service camps (sevā camps) that provide free meals, lodging, and medical assistance. Devotees carry sacred red and gold triangular flags (dhwajas), which are consecrated and hoisted atop the temple spire in fulfillment of vows (sukhnā or manautī) made to the deity.

Attendance during the annual Bhadarvi Poonam Fair varies between 3.2 and 4.5 million pilgrims over the seven-day period, managed through multi-lane barricaded pathways and temporary health centers deployed along the approach highways.

=== Navratri, Garba, and Bhavai ===
During Navaratri (September–October), the Chachar Chowk becomes an important focal point for the traditional Gujarati dance, the Garba. Devotees dance in concentric circles around the central courtyard throughout the nine nights, celebrating the Goddess as the source of dynamic life.

Navratri at Ambaji is also historically linked with Bhavai, an ancient open-air folk theatre performed by Nayak and Bhojak artists. Staged in the temple courtyard, Bhavai performances combine ritual hymns to Ambā with scriptural dramas and social satires, functioning both as an offering to the Goddess and as public entertainment for pilgrims.

== Social dynamics and gender ==
=== Tribal and cross-caste interface ===
Anthropological studies of regional goddess sanctuaries in western India observe that pilgrimage places often provide venues for cross-caste and tribal integration. Although high-caste Nagar Brahmins have historically conducted formal Sanskrit recitations (such as the *Caṇḍī-pāṭha*) at the sanctuary, the temple maintains traditional connections with regional Adivasi communities, particularly the Bhil and Garasia tribes of the Arasur forests. Tribal devotees participate in public rituals, make customary flag offerings during the monsoon melas, and preserve folk narratives concerning their ancestral relationship with the goddess. During major gatherings, the collective sharing of consecrated food (prasāda) creates a temporary suspension of social hierarchy, functioning as communitas.

=== Women's ritual agency ===
In gender studies of North Indian Hinduism, goddess worship is noted for providing institutional avenues for women's religious agency. Women make up a large portion of walking pilgrims during the annual fairs and observe fasts (vrats) dedicated to Ambā. The goddess is approached by married women (saubhāgyavatī) who perform rituals for the well-being of their households and the longevity of their spouses. The temple is also an important centre for muṇḍan—the ritual first haircut of children—where families fulfill vows in gratitude for child health and safe childbirth.

== Governance and recent developments ==
=== Trust administration and financial oversight ===
Following Indian independence and the integration of Danta State, management of the sanctuary was transferred to the Shri Arasuri Ambaji Mata Devasthan Trust (SAAMDT). The trust is chaired ex-officio by the District Collector of Banaskantha and functions under the oversight of the Charity Commissioner of Gujarat. The trust manages temple maintenance, crowd logistics, daily ritual food distributions, educational institutions, and pilgrim guesthouses.

The trust enforces standardized operating procedures for treasury transparency, including continuous closed-circuit television (CCTV) surveillance, mandatory physical frisking of accounting personnel, and live-streamed counting of cash and gold offerings received in shrine collection boxes (dan peti). Alongside in-person services, the trust established continuous digital broadcasting of daily rituals, streaming live footage from the sanctum and the circumambulatory courtyard to international and domestic devotees via dedicated web feeds and public television.

=== Statutory framework and town planning ===
In September 2020, the Gujarat Legislative Assembly passed legislation enacted as the Ambaji Area Development and Pilgrimage Tourism Governance Act, 2020, establishing a statutory authority empowered to prepare development and town-planning schemes, remove encroachments, and levy fees and development charges in a notified area surrounding the temple. The Act does not affect the powers and functions of the Shri Arasuri Ambaji Mata Devasthan Trust, which retains sole authority to administer religious activities, sanctum maintenance, and trust endowments.

=== Infrastructure and corridor projects ===
In the 2020s, state-sponsored infrastructure projects added multi-tier queuing complexes, electric shuttle transit, and connectivity corridors linking the main temple with Gabbar Hill and the Mansarovar tank. To accommodate growing crowds, the Government of Gujarat initiated the Ambaji Shakti Corridor project to develop Ambaji as a model temple town through dedicated pedestrian concourses and expanded civic amenities. To manage logistics during the annual Bhadarvi Poonam fair, administrative authorities introduced centralized data hubs and digital parking reservation systems to regulate traffic flow and streamline crowd movement.

=== Disputes and controversies ===
In March 2023, an administrative decision by the trust to replace traditional gram-flour mohanthal with peanut-based chikki as the consecrated offering (prasāda)—intended to extend packaged shelf-life—provoked public protests, debate in the Gujarat Legislative Assembly, and opposition from socio-religious organizations. Following government intervention, the trust reversed the decision and reinstated mohanthal as the primary offering.

== Accessibility ==
Ambaji is connected by road to Palanpur (65 kms) and Ahmedabad (185 kms). The nearest railway station is Abu Road (about 20 km), with links to Delhi, Mumbai and Jaipur. The nearest major airport is Sardar Vallabhbhai Patel International Airport in Ahmedabad.

== See also ==
- Shakta pithas
- Devi Mahatmya
- Kalika Mata Temple, Pavagadh
- Bahuchara Mata
- Māru-Gurjara architecture
