= Dhuldhoya =

Hindu community in Gujarat, India

The Dhuldhoya are a Hindu community found in the state of Gujarat in India. They speak Gujarati.
