= Nava Sudasana =

- Village
- Location in Gujarat, India
- Coordinates: 24.027281°N 72.6888138°E
- Country: India
- State: Gujarat
- District: Mehsana
- Elevation: 73 m (240 ft)

Population (2011)
  - Total: 6,500

Languages
  - Official: Gujarati, Hindi
- Time zone: UTC+5:30 (IST)
- PIN: 384340
- Website: Village of Nava sudasana On web
- A Place for peace lovers

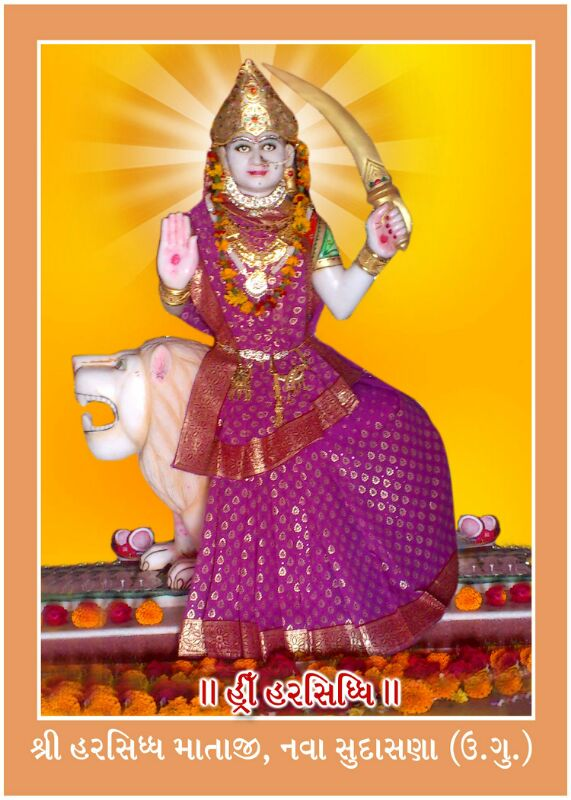
Harsidhh Mataji nava sudasana

Temple of Harsidhh Mataji at Nava Sudasana

Nava sudasana is a village in Satlasana Taluka, Mehsana district in the Indian state of Gujarat, India. The population of village is around 6,500. The Aravalli Range passes through the Nava Sudasana. The village recently built a temple of their Kuldevi (Ancestry Goddess) Harsiddhi Mataji.

== History ==
Before India gained independence from Britain, Sudasana (a village near Nava Sudasana) was a small place ruled by Barad Rajput (a branch of Parmar Rajput).

=== History of rulers ===
Here is the history of the rulers of Sudasana (genealogy-wise):

- Thakore Shri Amarsinhji Punjasinhji was the first Thakore of Sudasana. He was ruler of Sudasana in 1600. The exact period is unknown. He was married, but his spouse's name is unknown. They had issue named Thakore Shri Hathioji Amarsinhji. After the death of Amarsinhji his son, Thakore Shri Hathioji became ruler.
- Thakore Shri Hathioji Amarsinhji was married but the name of his spouse is unknown. They have issue named Thakore Shri Khomansinhji. After Shri Hathioji his son Thakore Shri Khomansinhji Hathioji came as ruler in 1687. but just after one and a half years he was deposed by the usurper Thakore of Ranpur, Thakore Shri Jasovji.
- Thakore Jasovji became the fourth ruler of Sudasana. He remained ruler for just three and half months, after that his son Thakore Shri Sardarsinhji became ruler. Shri Sardarsinhji was married and had issue but the name of Kuwar is unknown. Kuwar was also married and had issues Thakore Shri Amarsinhji II named after the first ruler of Sudasana. Thakore Shri Sardarsinhji also had one daughter, Maharani Takhtande Kunwar. She married Maharao Maan Singhji III as his second wife. He was Maharao of Sirohi.
- After Thakore Jasovji died his grandson became the ruler of Sudasana Thakore Shri Amarsinhji II (the reason why the son of Thakore Jasovji did not become ruler is unknown). Thakore Shri Amarsinhji was married and had issue named Kuwar Shri Fatehsinhji. Soon after Shri Jasovji, his son became the seventh ruler of Sudasana, Thakore Shri Fatehsinhji Amarsinhji. He was married and had an issue named Kuwar Shri Mohbatsinhji.
- Succeeding his father Thakore Shri Mohbatsinhji Fatehsinji became eighth ruler of Sudasana. He was married and had issue named Kuwar Shri Harisinhji, Kuwar Ratansinhji, Kuwar Pratapsinhji. As elder son, Thakore Shri Harisinhji Mohbatsinhji succeeded his father and became the ninth ruler of Sudasana in 1838. But he died in 1842 of unknown cause and his younger brother Thakore Shri Ratansinhji Mohbatsinhji became the tenth ruler of Sudasana. He also died after two years in 1844 of unknown cause. But he was married and had issue named Kuwar Shri Bhupatsinhji.

Thakore Shri Kirtisinhji Practising with a bow

- After the death of Thakore Shri Ratansinhji in 1844 there was a one-year gap during which the seat remained empty and it was managed by the State Manager because Kuwar Shri Bhupatsinhji was born in 1843 and died in 1845 of unknown cause. But he was declared the eleventh ruler of Sudasana due to respect for his death.
- But just after this, the youngest son of Shri Mohbatsinhji Thakore Shri Pratapsinhji Mohbatsinhji became the twelfth ruler of Sudasana and remained on the throne till 1885. He was married and had issue named Kuwar Shri Takhatsinhji. After the death of Shri Pratapsinhji, his son Thakore Shri Takhatsinhji became the ruler in 1985 and remained ruler till his death in 1900. He was married and had issue named Kuwar Shri Prithisinhji and Thakurani Man Kunwar. Thakurani Man Kunwar was married to Thakore Mohabat Singh as his second wife. Thakore Mohabat Singh was ruler of Nimbaj.
- And after the death of Shri Takhatsinhji, the State Manager handled the management for from 1900-1905 till Shri Prithisinhji was enthroned in 1905 as the 14th ruler of Sudasana. He was married and had issue named Kuwar Shri Ranjitsinhji. Thakore Shri Prithisinhji ruled till his death in 1947 after that Thakore Shri Ranjitsinhji became the 15th Thakore Shri of Sudasana.
- Thakore Shri Ranjitsinhji was married to Baisa Mimnoo Kanwar and she became Thakorani of Sudasana. She was the daughter of Maharaja Ratansinhji Singhji Sahib. He was Thakore of Raoti. Thakore Shri Ranjitsinhji had issue named Kuwar Shri Kirtikumar Singhji Ranjit Singhji.
- After death of Thakore Shri Ranjitsinhji in 1952 Thakore Shri Kirtikumar Singhji Ranjit Singhji became the 16th Thakore of Sudasana in 1952 and he currently lives in Sudasana. He is married to Thakorani Laxmi Kanvar. She is the daughter of Colonel Maharaj Rao Saheb Shardool Singhji, Thakore of Achrol. Shri Kirtikumar Singhji had issue, Kumari Hemangani Kumari. She died on 23 March 2014 due to a health problem.

Thakore Shree riding a horse

One-rupee note of Sudasana state (cancelled after India's independence)
