= Vanza =

Vanza also spelt as Wanza sometimes, is a Hindu Khatri artisan community from Gujarat state of India. The main occupation of the community is of weaving, dyeing and also tailoring -Darzi works. Outside India, the caste has diaspora and caste associations in nations like Kenya, Uganda, United Kingdom, and Canada. They worship Hinglaj as their kuldevi and many are followers of Pushtimarg sect of Hinduism.

== See also ==
- Sai Suthar
