= Mengni =

Human settlement in Gujarat, India

Mengni is a town and former minor Rajput princely state on Saurashtra peninsula, in Gujarat, western India.

== History ==
Mengni was a Fifth Class princely state, also comprising seven more villages, covering 35 square miles in the Halar prant of Kathiawar. It was ruled by Jadeja Rajput Chieftains.

It had a combined population of 3,354 in 1901, yielding a state revenue of 29,847 Rupees (1903–4, mostly from land) and paying a tribute of 3,412 Rupees, to the British.

== Sources and external links ==
- Imperial Gazetteer, on dsal.uchicago.edu
