= Sadra, Gandhinagar =

Coordinates: 23.3500°N 72.7833°E

Sadra is a village, on the banks of Sabarmati River, in Gandhinagar Taluka in Gandhinagar district of Gujarat state, India.

== History ==
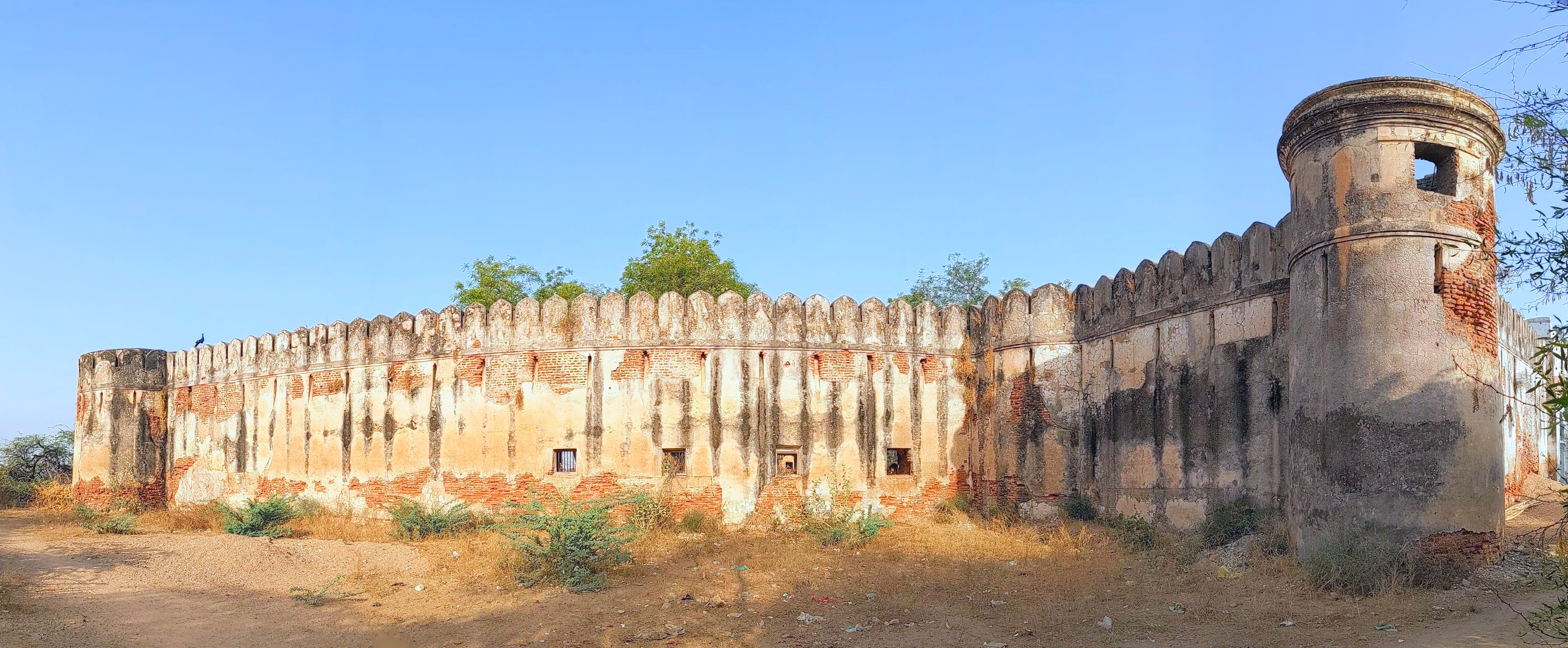
Sadra Fort

Sadra was a military post during Mughal period and was known as Islamabad. The village was under Vasna State during British period and served as the headquarters of the Mahi Kantha Agency. When, in 1821, the Mahi Kantha Agency was established, a piece of land near the village was rented from the Vasna Thakor for a station. In the ground was a small fort said to have been built by Ahmed Shah I (1411–1443), when he built the fort of Ahmednagar in 1426.

As per 2009 stats, Sadra village is also a gram panchayat. According to Census 2011 information the location code or village code of Sadra village is 511242 The total geographical area of village is 1214.71 hectares. Sadra has a total population of 5,989 peoples. There are about 1,205 houses in Sadra village. The total population of village is 5989 with gender distribution for males is 3115 and for female is 2874.
