= Parmar (clan) =

Rajput clan

Profile
- Region: Uttarakhand. Gujarat, Rajasthan Madhya Pradesh
- Parmar no longer has a chief, and is an armigerous clan
Clan branches
Sodha

Parmar, also known as Panwar or Pawar is a Rajput clan that claims descent from the Agnivanshi lineage. They are mainly found in Northern and Central India, especially in the states of Rajasthan, Gujarat, Madhya Pradesh, Punjab, Haryana, Uttarakhand, Himachal Pradesh, Uttar Pradesh, Bihar, Jharkhand, and Maharashtra. They are also known as Bhoyar, Bhoyar Pawar, or Powar in the Vidarbha region of Maharashtra. The capital of the Parmar dynasty was Ujjain, and later it shifted to Dhar.

An offshoot of the Parmars, known as the Sodha, also ruled in Amarkot, in the Sindh province of Pakistan.

The clan name is also used by Jats, Gurjars, Kōḷīs, Garoḍās, Līmaciyā Valands, Mōcīs, Tūrīs, Luhārs, Kansārās, Darajīs, Bhāvasārs, Cūnvāḷiyās, Ghañcīs, Harijans, Sōnīs, Sutārs, Dhobīs, Khavāsas, Rabārīs, Āhīrs, Meos, Sandhīs, Pīñjārās, Vāñjhās, Dhūḷadhōyās, Rāvaḷs, Vāgharīs, Bhīls, Āñjaṇās, Mer and Ḍhēḍhs.

== Notable people ==
- Mani Singh
- Bachittar Singh
- Udai Singh
- Yashwant Singh Parmar
- Talwinder Singh Parmar

== See also ==
- Paramara dynasty
- Panwar
- Pawar
- Rajput
- Rajputisation

== Sources ==
- Russell, R.V. (1916). "Panwar Rajput". The Tribes and Castes of the Central Provinces of India: pt. II. Descriptive articles on the principal castes and tribes of the Central Provinces. Macmillan and Company. pp. 330–351.
