= Maharana =

Variation on the Indian royal title Rana

The Maharana ("Great Rana") is a variation on the Indian royal title Rana. Maharana denotes 'great king' or 'high king', similar to the word "Maharaja". The term derives from the Sanskrit title "Mahārāṇaka".

== Usage at the time of independence ==
=== Salute states ===
The gun salutes enjoyed by the states that acceded to the Dominion of India on 14 August 1947, included the following Maharanas:

- Hereditary salute of 19-guns (21-guns local): the Maharana of Udaipur State (Mewar)
- Hereditary salute of 13-guns the Maharana of Rajpipla
- Hereditary salute of 11-guns: the Maharana of Barwani

Hereditary salutes of 9-guns:

- The Maharana of Danta
- The Maharana of Wadhwan
- The Maharana of Sant

Some of the rulers were granted increased gun salutes after the independence, e.g. the above-listed Maharana of Mewar (Hindu; at Udaipur, Maharajpramukh in Rajasthan) was raised to first place in the Order of Precedence, displacing the Nizam of Hyderabad and Berar (Muslim), and all 9-gun states were permitted the use of the style of Highness.

== Compound ruler titles ==
- The Maharana Raj Sahib of Wankaner - Hereditary salute of 11-guns
- The Maharana Sahib of Dharampur
