= Postage stamps and postal history of the Nyasaland Protectorate =

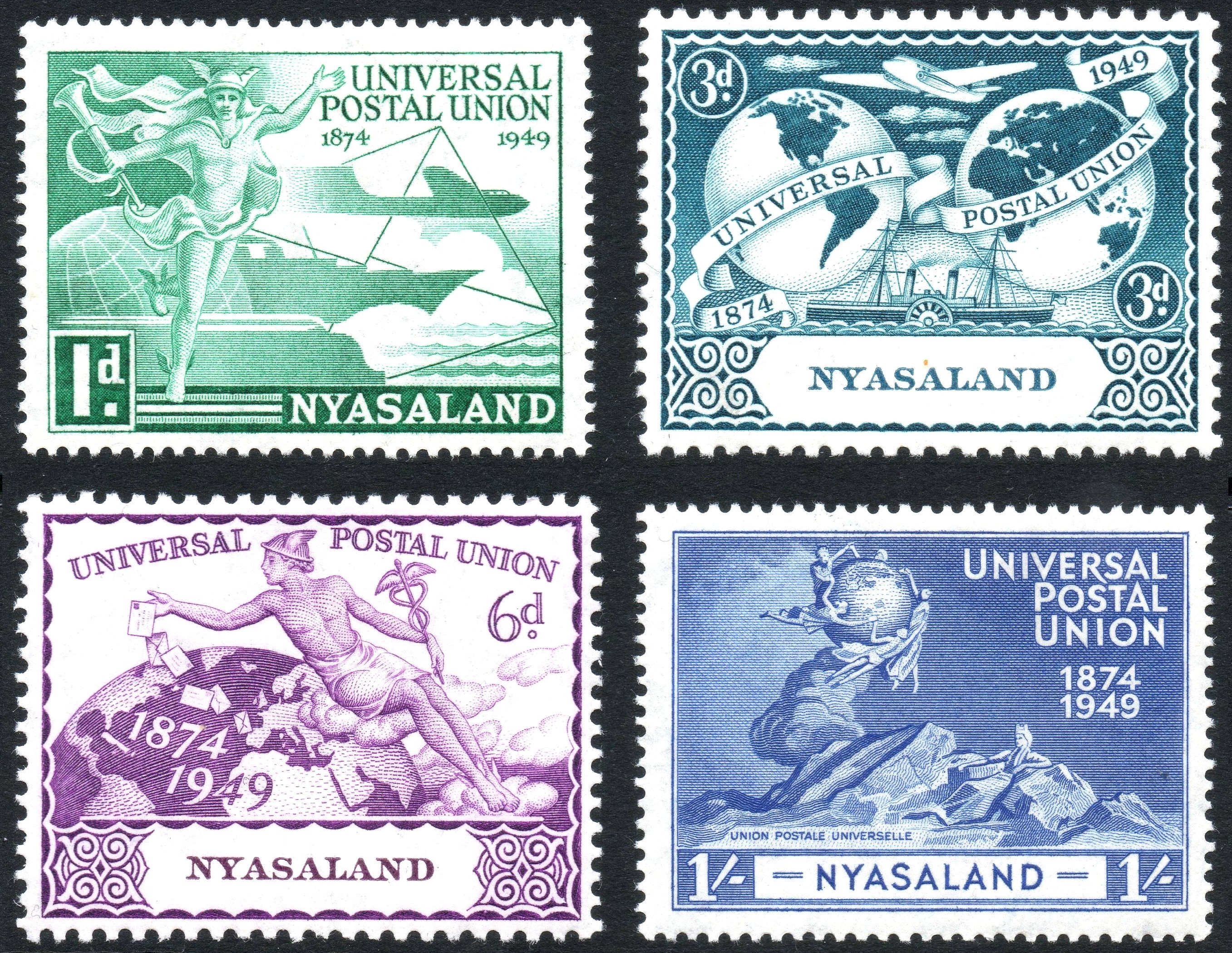
The 1949 U.P.U. set of the Nyasaland Protectorate

On 6 July 1907 the British Central Africa Protectorate became the Nyasaland Protectorate and its first stamps were issued on 22 July 1908.

Stamps were marked Nyasaland Protectorate and later just Nyasaland. From 1953 to 1963 Nyasaland was united with Northern Rhodesia and Southern Rhodesia and used stamps of the Federation of Rhodesia and Nyasaland. Nyasaland resumed issuing stamps in 1963 before becoming independent. After independence in 1964, stamps were marked Malawi.

== See also ==
- Postage stamps and postal history of British Central Africa
- Postage stamps and postal history of the Federation of Rhodesia and Nyasaland
- Postage stamps and postal history of Malawi
- Revenue stamps of Nyasaland and Malawi
