= Revenue stamps of Nyasaland and Malawi =

Map of Nyasaland, now known as Malawi.

Nyasaland, now known as Malawi, first issued revenue stamps as British Central Africa in 1891 and continued to do so until the late 1980s.

== British Central Africa ==
British Central Africa first issued revenue stamps in 1891. These were revenue stamps of the British South Africa Company overprinted B.C.A. Later that year large designs bearing stamps of the British South Africa Company but in a large ornate border inscribed REVENUE B.C.A. were issued. The 2/6 to £10 values were vertical and perforated but the £25 and £50 values were horizontal and exist perforated and imperforate. In 1893 some of these were surcharged with new values. These were withdrawn around 1895 and high value postage stamps were used for fiscal purposes afterwards. Since they were in use for a short period of time they are scarce and command high prices by collectors.

Between 1898 and 1906 various postage stamps were overprinted Consular or CONSULAR. Later similar postage stamps were defaced with this wording by manuscript. All of these are hard to find and quite rare.

== Nyasaland ==
In 1913, postage stamps received a manuscript consular overprint. From 1908 to 1921 Nyasaland used postage stamps for other fiscal purposes. High values of these were mainly intended for fiscal rather than postal use. In 1921 a King George V 6d stamp was overprinted Revenue Only to restrict it to fiscal use. In 1938 a £10 keyplate stamp featuring King George VI was issued. In all, 6300 were printed, but only about 8 survive to this day making it one of the rarest Commonwealth revenues ever issued.

In 1953, postage stamps from the Queen Elizabeth II issue were overprinted REVENUE or Revenue for fiscal use. In 1955 a new design featuring the Queen and the coat of arms was issued, and some of these were later overprinted for postal purposes in 1963. Employment stamps featuring the coat of arms were also issued around 1962.

From 1956 to 1963, Nyasaland used revenue stamps of the Federation of Rhodesia and Nyasaland.

== Malawi ==
In 1970, Malawi issued a set of six numeral stamps to pay the Graduated Tax, and it was denominated in shillings and pence. A year later this was reissued in Malawian kwacha, and in 1973 there were some surcharged issues. These are not common but they do not command high prices.

Between 1980 and 1988, Malawi also issued stamps to pay the Passenger Service Charge, or airport tax. These were denominated wither in kwacha (MK) or US dollars (US$) for local or international flights.

== See also ==
- Postage stamps and postal history of British Central Africa
- Postage stamps and postal history of the Nyasaland Protectorate
- Postage stamps and postal history of Malawi
- Revenue stamps of the Federation of Rhodesia and Nyasaland
