= Revenue stamps of the Federation of Rhodesia and Nyasaland =

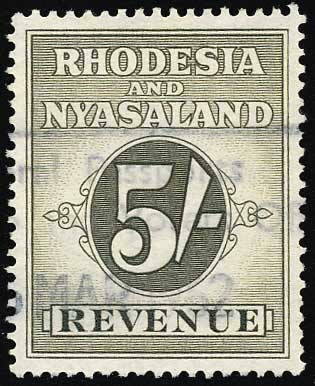
A 1956 5/- revenue stamp of Rhodesia and Nyasaland

The Federation of Rhodesia and Nyasaland was a short lived semi-independent state in southern Africa that existed from 1953 to the end of 1963. The state comprised the former self-governing colony of Southern Rhodesia and the British protectorates of Northern Rhodesia and Nyasaland. It issued its own revenue stamps from around 1953 to 1955, and these were withdrawn after the federation ceased to exist.

In 1953 or 1954 a numeral design simply inscribed RHODESIA AND NYASALAND REVENUE and the value was issued. Nine values were issued in all, ranging from 6d to £5. None of these are common, and the high values are particularly scarce. In 1955, the Federation issued three excise stamps for use on cigarette packets. These are quite rare as they were usually torn when used.

== See also ==
- Postage stamps and postal history of the Federation of Rhodesia and Nyasaland
- Revenue stamps of Rhodesia
- Revenue stamps of Nyasaland and Malawi
