= Postage stamps and postal history of Malawi =

A 1966 £2 stamp of Malawi

This is a survey of the postage stamps and postal history of Malawi.

Malawi is a landlocked country in southeast Africa that was formerly known as Nyasaland. It is bordered by Zambia to the northwest, Tanzania to the northeast, and Mozambique on the east, south and west. The country is separated from Tanzania and Mozambique by Lake Malawi. Its size is over 118,000 km^{2} (45,560 sq mi) with an estimated population of more than 13,900,000. Its capital is Lilongwe.

== First stamps ==
The first stamps of Malawi were issued on 6 July 1964. Stamps had previously been issued under the names of the British Central Africa Protectorate from 1891 and later the Nyasaland Protectorate and Federation of Rhodesia and Nyasaland from 1908 and 1954, respectively.

== See also ==
- Postage stamps and postal history of British Central Africa
- Postage stamps and postal history of the Nyasaland Protectorate
- Postage stamps of the Federation of Rhodesia and Nyasaland
- Revenue stamps of Nyasaland and Malawi
- Revenue stamps of Rhodesia
