= Postage stamps and postal history of Zimbabwe =

A 1980 stamp of Zimbabwe

This is a survey of the postage stamps and postal history of Zimbabwe.

Zimbabwe, formerly Southern Rhodesia is a landlocked country located in the southern part of Africa between the Zambezi and Limpopo rivers. It is bordered by South Africa to the south, Botswana to the southwest, Zambia to the northwest and Mozambique to the east.

== History ==
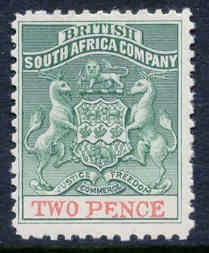
Stamp of British South Africa Company

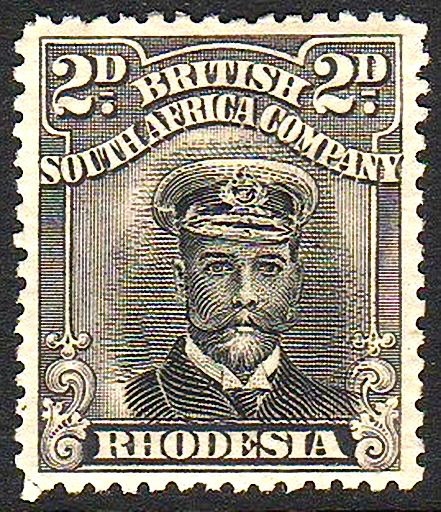
1913 stamp of British South Africa Company also inscribed "Rhodesia"

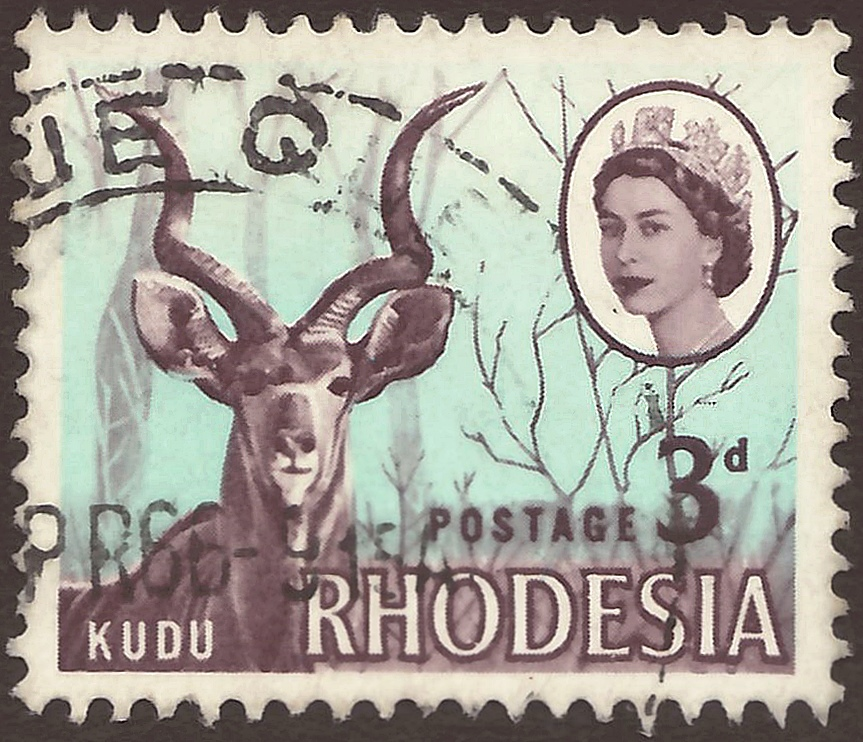
1966 issue of same design inscribed "Rhodesia"

Early European explorers, missionaries and traders, in the area that became Zimbabwe, hired private couriers, or made other arrangements to have their mail carried to the nearest post office which first meant one in the Cape of Good Hope Colony, and later included the post offices in the South African Republic (Transvaal).

== British South Africa Company ==
The first post was established in 1888 by the British South Africa Company (BSA) consisting of a route from Gubulawayo in Matabeleland to Mafeking in Bechuanaland, with post offices in Tati and Bulawayo. Mail was initially carried by police riders and franked with the stamps of British Bechuanaland. In fact the post offices in Bulawayo and Tati remained under the control of the Bechuanaland Protectorate until 1894.

The post was introduced to Mashonaland and western Manicaland in 1890 by the BSA who had sent occupying forces there, the Pioneer Column accompanied by the company's police force. By 1894 Matabeleland was fully included within the company's postal system following the First Matabele War.

The BSA company had stamps printed in London in 1890, and they arrived in the colony on 1891. Although there was some revenue use of the stamps in 1891, the first postal use began in January 1892 when the postal route through Beira on the east coast was opened up. Over the next couple of years the area controlled by the BSA grew and land north of the Zambezi River was added. The name "Rhodesia" first appeared on BSA stamps in 1909 when four stamps were overprinted with new values. The stamps of the BSA were not, at first, recognized for international postage, and letters going through Bechuanaland were franked with additional Bechuanaland stamps until Rhodesia joined the South African Postal Union in mid 1892, while mail sent via Beira required additional Mozambique stamps until 1894.

The area continued to use the stamps of the BSA until 1923 when it became the Self-governing Colony of Southern Rhodesia. The area north of the Zambezi River remained under the BSA until the following year, when it became a protectorate named Northern Rhodesia.

== Southern Rhodesia ==
Southern Rhodesia issued its first stamps on 1 April 1924. In 1953, Southern Rhodesia joined the Federation of Rhodesia and Nyasaland. During a short interim period, stamps from Southern Rhodesia, Northern Rhodesia and Nyasaland could be used in any of the three countries.

The Federation dissolved in 1963 and the 10th Anniversary of Federation stamps designed for December release were not issued. In 1964, the country issued a definitive series under Southern Rhodesia. This remained until the Unilateral Declaration of Independence after which it released its stamps under the name of Rhodesia.

== Rhodesia ==
Rhodesia unilaterally proclaimed independence in 1965 and issued stamps until 1978. No stamps were issued in 1979 during the Zimbabwe Rhodesia period.

== Zimbabwe ==
The first stamps with the name Zimbabwe were issued on 18 April 1980, they were a set of definitives and featured the same designs as the previous definitive stamps of Rhodesia.

== See also ==
- Postage stamps of the Federation of Rhodesia and Nyasaland
- Revenue stamps of Rhodesia
