= Postage stamps and postal history of Zambia =

A 1967 stamp of Zambia

This is a survey of the postage stamps and postal history of Zambia, formerly known as Northern Rhodesia.

== British South Africa Company ==
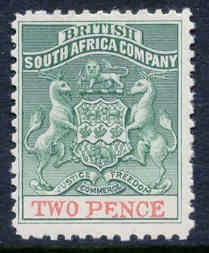
Stamp of British South Africa Company

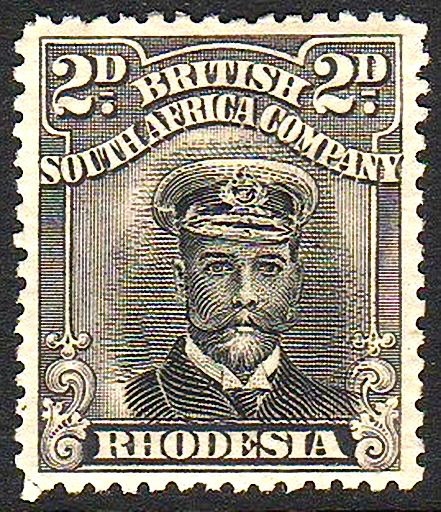
1913 stamp of British South Africa Company also inscribed "Rhodesia"

In the 1890s, mail from North-Western Rhodesia was carried by runner to Bulawayo, while North-Eastern Rhodesia mail went via British Central Africa until 1895.

Stamps were issued by the British South Africa Company in 1890 for use in territories administered by the company. From 1909, stamps were inscribed "Rhodesia" in addition to the company's name.

== Northern Rhodesia ==
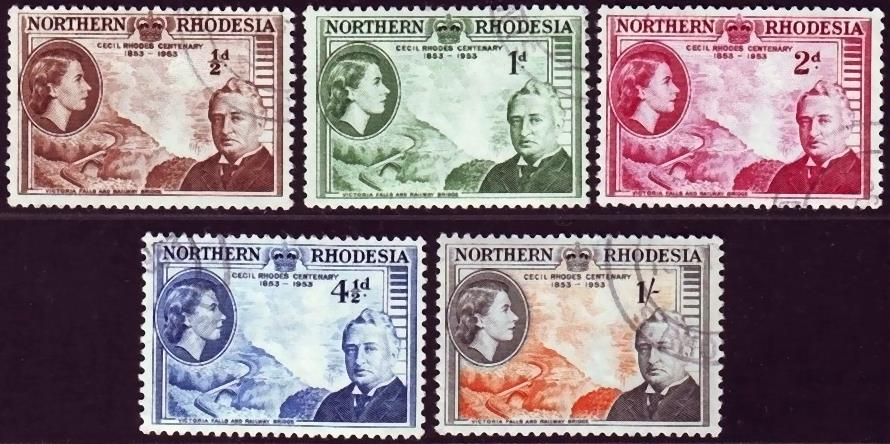
1953 stamps of Northern Rhodesia marking the birth centennial of Cecil Rhodes

Northern Rhodesia was created in 1911 from territory administered by the British South Africa Company, becoming an official British protectorate in 1924.

On 1 April 1925, Northern Rhodesia issued its first stamps. Inscribed "NORTHERN RHODESIA", the seventeen values all depicted a wilderness scene with elephants and a giraffe, surmounted by a profile of King George V. The same design was adapted for King George VI in 1938.

Upon the death of King George VI in February, 1952, Elizabeth II came to the throne, and a new set of Northern Rhodesia stamps was issued with her portrait.

Northern Rhodesia's first commemorative stamps were a set of five on 30 May 1953, marking the birth centennial of Cecil Rhodes, along with another stamp issued on the same day for the Rhodes Centenary Exhibition. As Elizabeth II of the United Kingdom was already on the throne, the stamps included her profile, even though the official coronation stamp did not come out until 2 June. This was followed in September by a definitive series using the same design as before, with the monarch's profile updated once again. Only a few months later, these stamps were withdrawn, and stamps of the Federation of Rhodesia and Nyasaland issued in their place.

Northern Rhodesia used the Federation's stamps from 1954 until it was dissolved in 1963. For an interim period, the stamps of Northern Rhodesia were valid for postage in all three territories: Northern Rhodesia, Southern Rhodesia and Nyasaland.

On 10 December 1963, a new definitive series depicted the Queen and the territory's arms were issued. These were hastily printed by Harrison & Sons Ltd and can be found with multiple errors such as missing values and double printing or missing colours. This definitive series was withdrawn on 23 October 1964 when Northern Rhodesia achieved independence and became the Republic of Zambia.

== Zambia ==
The first stamps of independent Zambia were issued on 24 October 1964. They consisted of a set of three commemoratives. On the same day, a set of 14 definitives was issued, with depictions of various professions and scenes.

== See also ==
- Postage stamps of the Federation of Rhodesia and Nyasaland
- Revenue stamps of Rhodesia
