= Postage stamps and postal history of the Federation of Rhodesia and Nyasaland =

The Federation of Rhodesia and Nyasaland, also known as the Central African Federation (CAF), was a semi-independent state in southern Africa that existed from 1953 to the end of 1963.

The state included the former self-governing (since 1923) Colony of Southern Rhodesia and the British protectorates of Northern Rhodesia, and Nyasaland. The Federation officially ended on 31 December 1963, when Northern Rhodesia gained independence from the United Kingdom as the new nation of Zambia and Nyasaland gained independence as the new nation of Malawi. Southern Rhodesia then became known as Rhodesia and is now Zimbabwe.

== First stamps ==
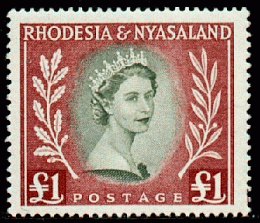
A £1 stamp of the Federation of Rhodesia and Nyasaland, 1954

The Federation issued its first postage stamps in 1954, all with a portrait of Queen Elizabeth II in three kinds of designs, and inscribed "RHODESIA & NYASALAND". The first to appear were 15 values from a halfpenny to £1 on 1 July. A further stamp of 2½ pence was issued on 15 February 1956 to cater for the new internal postal charge.

== Commemorative stamps ==
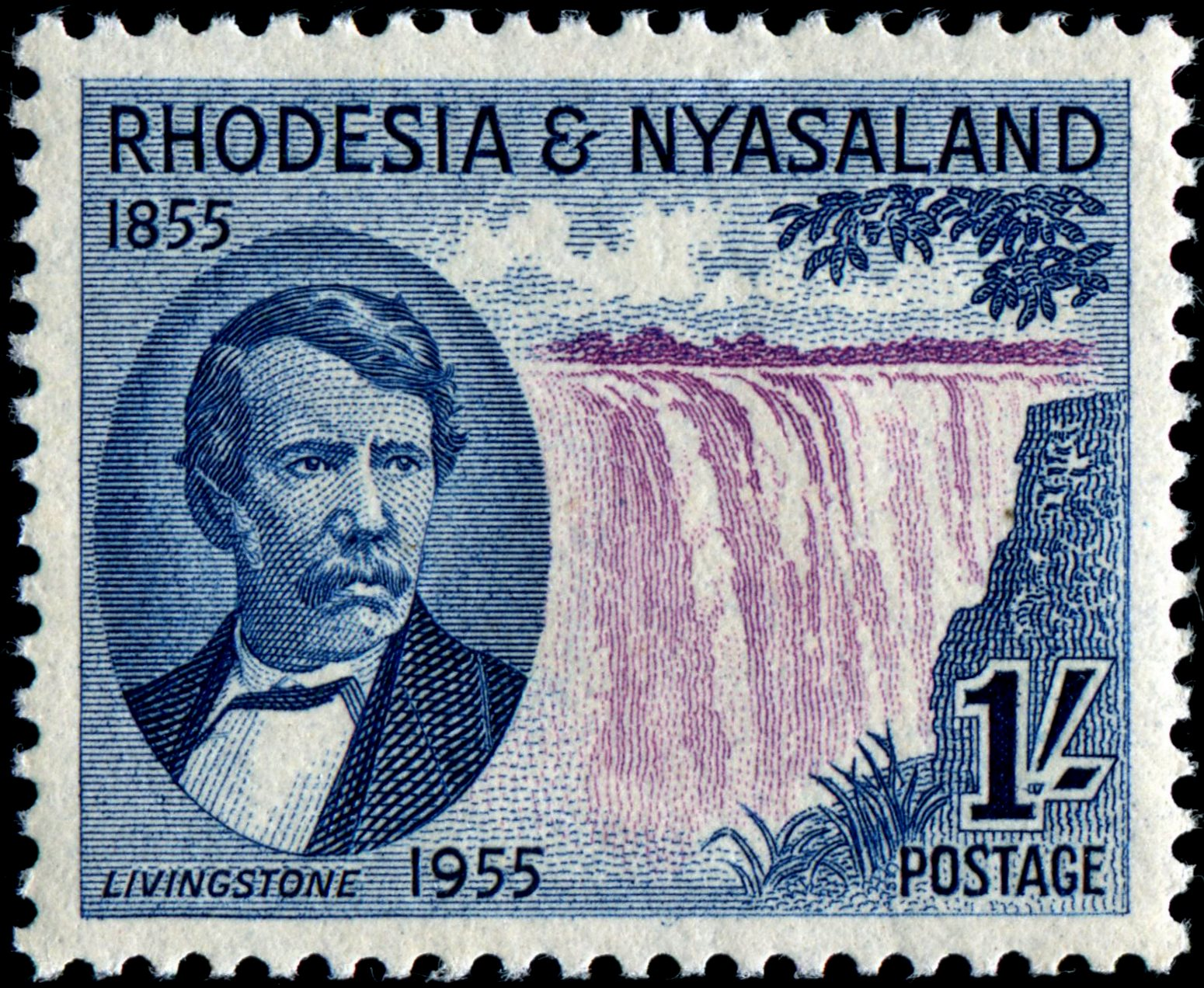
1955 stamp commemorating the 100th anniversary of David Livingstone's discovery of Victoria Falls

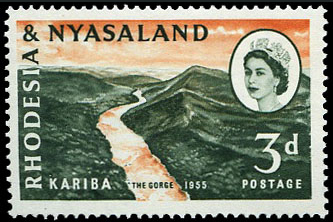
Opening of Kariba Hydro-electric Power Plant in 1960

A pair of commemorative stamps in 1955 signalled the 100th anniversary of David Livingstone's discovery of Victoria Falls, and a definitive series in 1959 consisted of 15 stamps depicting local scenery and industries.

Six additional special issues appeared in subsequent years.

- 17 May 1960 Kariba dam opening, set of 6.
- 8 May 1961 Mining Congress, set of 2.
- 6 February 1962 Anniversary of 1st Airmail to London, set of 3.
- 18 February 1963 Tobacco Congress, set of 4.
- 6 August 1963 Red cross centenary, set of 1.
- The last was issued 11 September 1963 to mark the World Council of the Young Men's Service Clubs that was held at the University College of Rhodesia and Nyasaland, set of 2.

== Postage due stamps ==
The 1d and 2d postage stamps from 1954 are known overprinted "POSTAGE DUE" reading diagonally from the bottom left hand corner to the upper right hand corner. It is not known whether these were actually issued or if they are cancellations.

A set of four postage due stamps with the values of 1d, 2d, 4d and 6d were issued on 19 April 1961, depicting a posthorn.

== See also ==
- Postage stamps and postal history of Malawi
- Postage stamps and postal history of Zambia
- Postage stamps and postal history of Zimbabwe
- Revenue stamps of the Federation of Rhodesia and Nyasaland
- Revenue stamps of Rhodesia
