= Excise stamps of Ukraine =

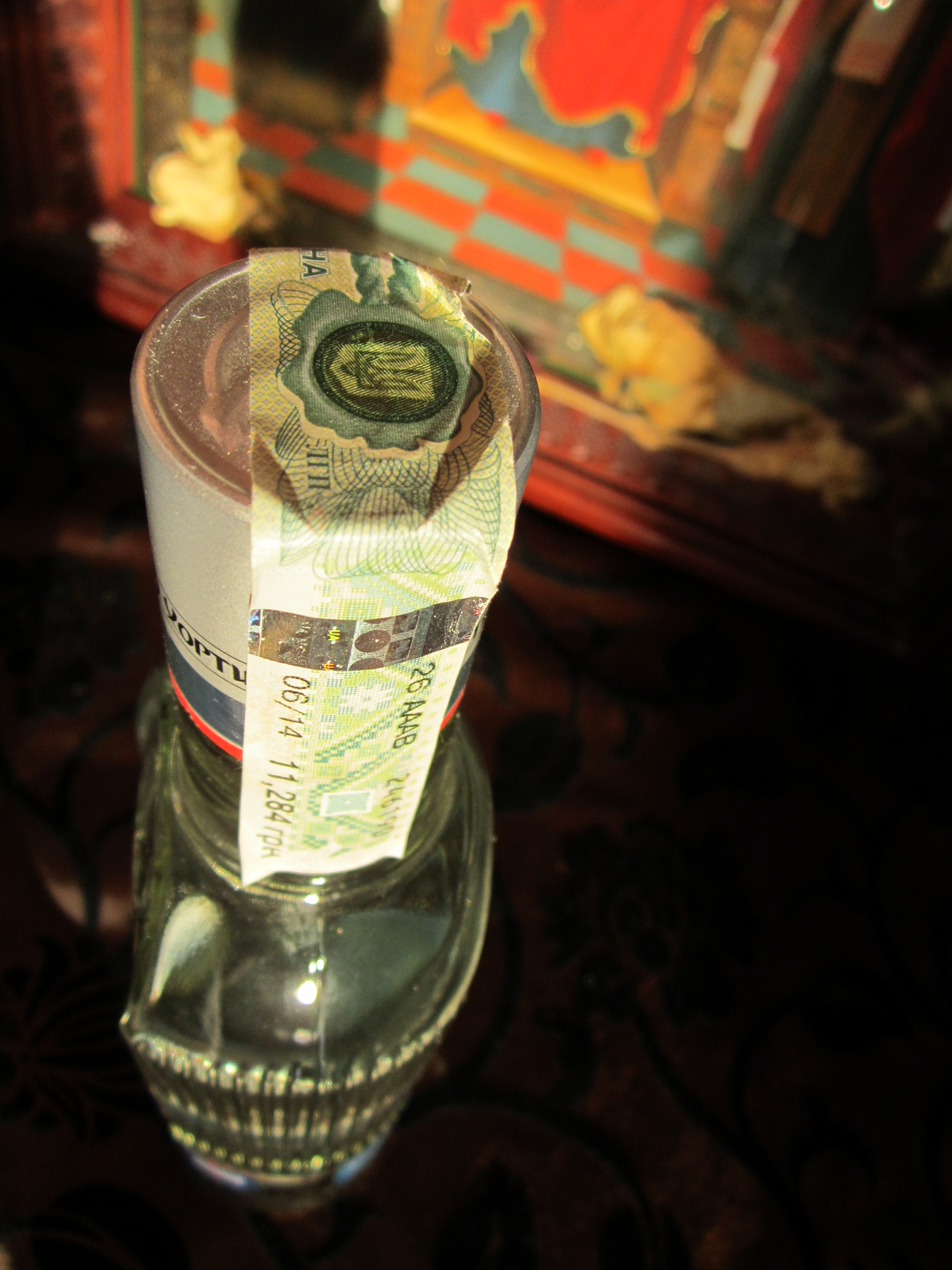
An excise stamp of Ukraine affixed to a bottle of spirits

Excise stamps of Ukraine are a kind of Ukrainian revenue stamps to collect excise tax. They are used in accordance with Ukraine's presidential decree of 18 September 1995, "On approval of the excise duty on alcoholic beverages and tobacco products".

On 24 October 1996, there was another decree of the Cabinet of Ministers of Ukraine, "On approval of the production, storage and sale of excise stamps and marking of alcoholic beverages and tobacco products, and the sale or destruction of the confiscated alcoholic beverages and tobacco products". It introduced excise stamps into circulation in Ukraine.

The law was amended by later decrees of the Ukrainian Government.

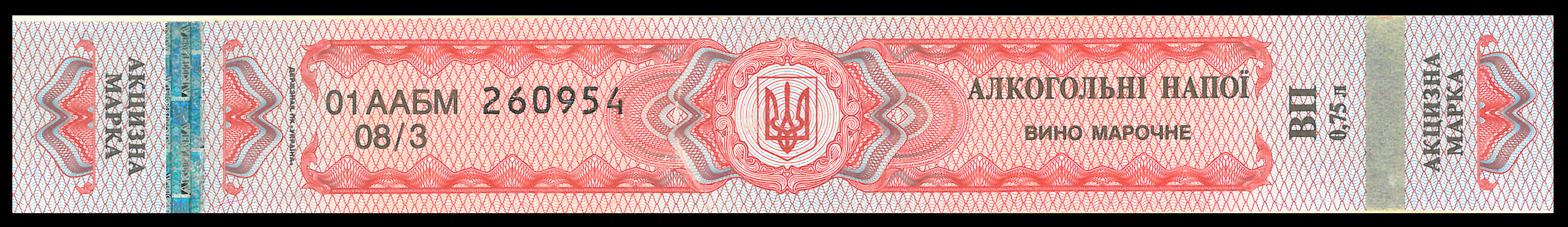
An excise stamp of Ukraine issued in 2005 for labeling wine

== See also ==
- Cigarette tax stamp
- Customs
- Excise
- Excise stamp
- Excise stamps of Russia
- Stamp Act
