= Excise stamps of Russia =

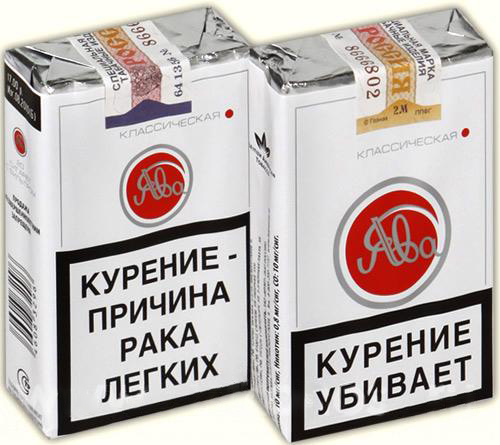
Excise stamps of Russia affixed to packs of the Java cigarettes

Excise stamps of Russia are a kind of Russian revenue stamps. They were issued according to the governmental order of the Russian Federation. On 14 April 1994 they adopted resolution number 319 "Introduction of excise stamps in the Russian Federation". Certain goods produced in Russia or imported to the territory of Russia are subject to excise tax including:

- vodka,
- alcohol,
- wine,
- tobacco and tobacco products.

Selling of goods subject to this law without affixing excise stamps is prohibited in the territory of Russia since 1 January 1995.

The law was amended by later decrees of the Russian Government.

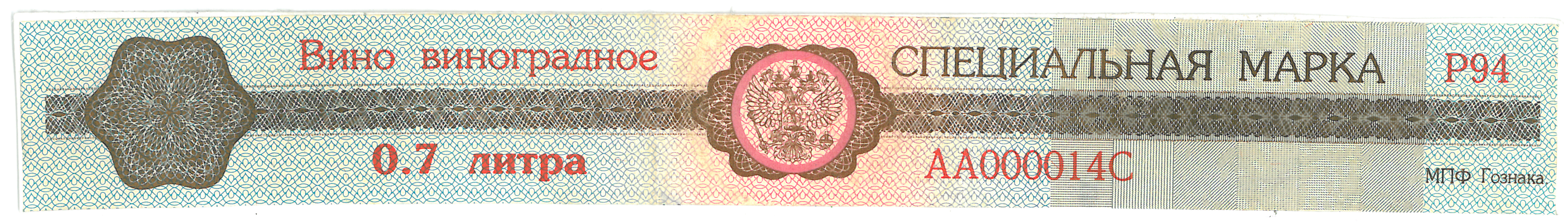
An excise stamp of Russia issued in 1994 for labeling wine

== See also ==
- Cigarette tax stamp
- Customs
- Excise
- Excise stamp
- Excise stamps of Ukraine
- Stamp Act
