= Postage stamps and postal history of British Central Africa Protectorate =

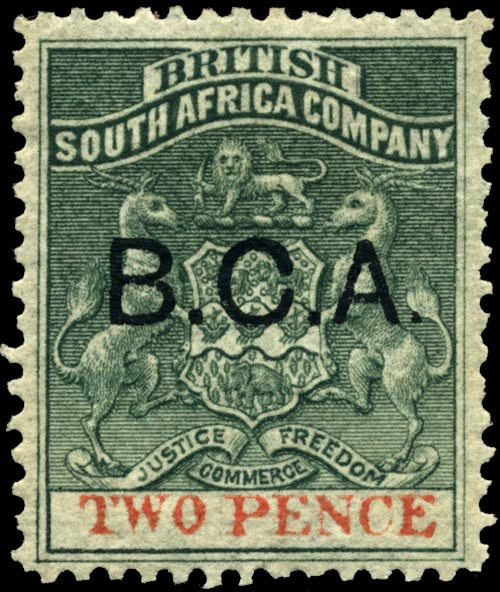
1891 overprint

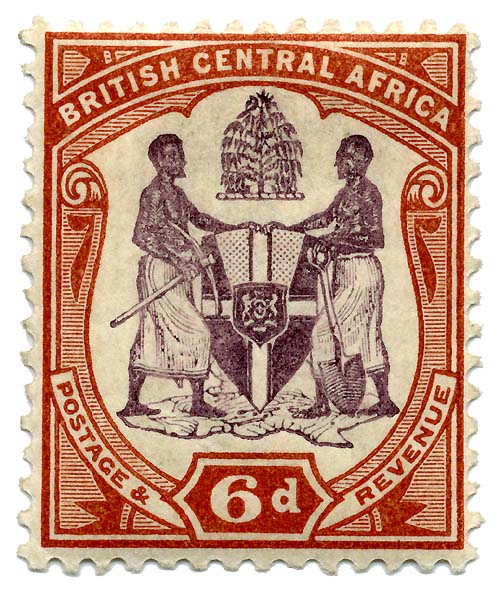
Six pence, 1897

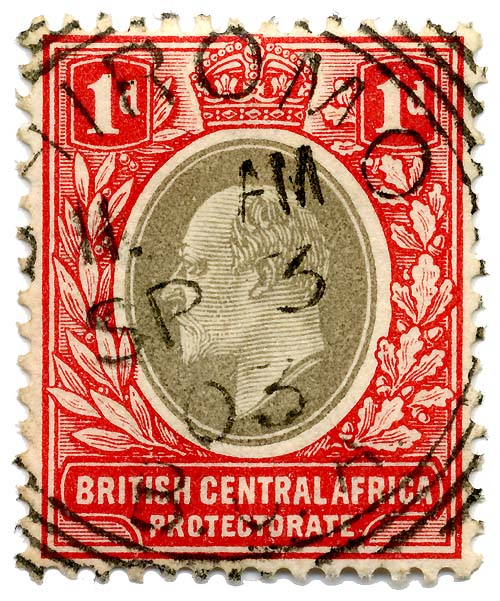
One penny of 1903, cancelled at Chiromo with a squared-circle postmark

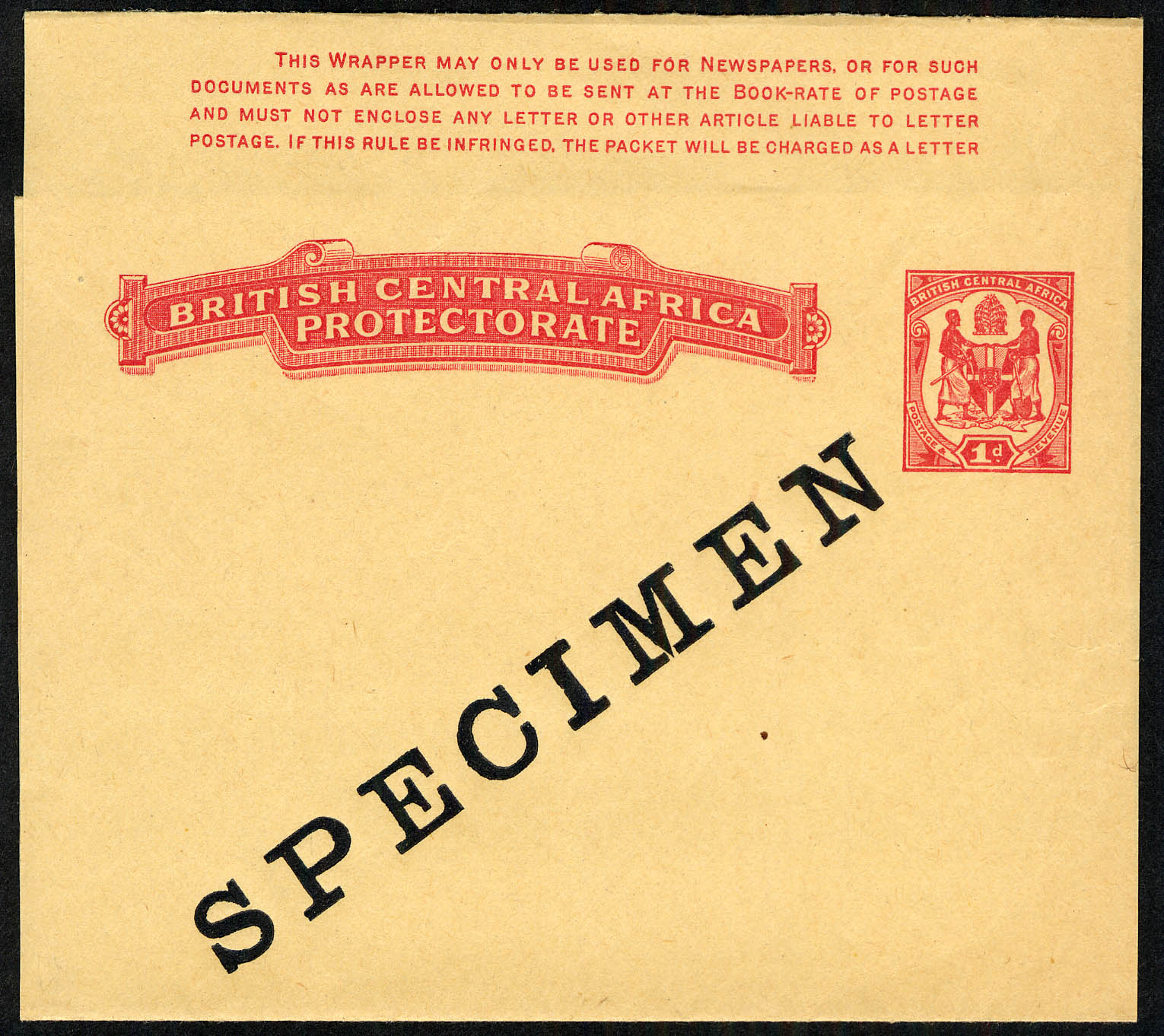
A newspaper wrapper issued in 1899 overprinted SPECIMEN. Specimen stamps and similar items were supplied to the Universal Postal Union for distribution to members.

The British Central Africa Protectorate existed in the area of present-day Malawi between 1891 and 1907.

== First stamps ==
The first postage stamps of the protectorate were issued in April 1891, produced by overprinting the Rhodesian stamps of the British South Africa Company with B.C.A.. A number of new post offices opened during the year, including Blantyre, Zomba, Chiromo, Port Herald, Fort Mlange, Fort Johnston at the southern end of the lake, and Karonga at the northern end of the lake. Chiromo was the main sorting office until after the Shire Highlands Railway was opened in 1908, when Limbe became the postal hub.

== Surcharges ==
Surcharged BSAC stamps were necessary in 1892, 1893, and 1895. 1895 also saw the introduction of stamps printed for the protectorate, featuring the protectorate's coat of arms and inscribed BRITISH CENTRAL AFRICA. The 1895 issue was printed by De La Rue on unwatermarked paper, but from February 1896 on the paper had either the Crown over CC or Crown over CA watermarks.

In August 1897 a new design was introduced, still using the coat of arms, but with a clear instead of a lined background.

In 1898 the supply of one-penny stamps ran out. Initially the 3-shilling postage stamp was surcharged, but on 11 March the government began to use embossed revenue stamps overprinted with INTERNAL / POSTAGE.

== Twentieth century ==
In 1901, the 1d, 4d, and 6d values of the 1897 stamps were printed in different colours. In 1903 a new series of stamps was issued, featuring the profile of King Edward VII and inscribed BRITISH CENTRAL AFRICA / PROTECTORATE, with denominations from one penny to ten pounds.

From 1908 stamps were issued by the Nyasaland Protectorate, and from 1964 Malawi.

== Postal stationery ==
The first items of postal stationery, for the British Central Africa Protectorate, were registration envelopes in 1892. Between 1892 and 1895 a total of 14 different registration envelopes have been identified as having been produced by overprinting British South Africa Company registration envelopes with BRITISH CENTRAL AFRICA ADMINISTRATION. During 1895 and 1896 three registration envelopes were designed and printed for the protectorate.

In 1893 two different postcards were issued using British South Africa Company postcards overprinted BRITISH CENTRAL AFRICA in an ornamental frame. New postcards designed for the protectorate were issued in 1896 (3 postcards), 1898 (2 postcards) and 1904 (2 postcards).

One newspaper wrapper was made available for use in 1899.

When the protectorate's name was changed to Nyasaland Protectorate all items of postal stationery continued to be valid.

== See also ==
- Postage stamps and postal history of the Nyasaland Protectorate
- Postage stamps and postal history of Malawi
- Revenue stamps of Nyasaland and Malawi
