= Revenue stamps of Rhodesia =

Stamps issued by Rhodesia

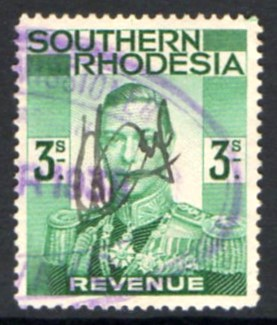
A Southern Rhodesia revenue stamp from 1937.

Rhodesia, now divided between Zambia and Zimbabwe, first issued revenue stamps in 1890, and Zimbabwe continues to do so to this day.

== British South Africa Company ==
The British South Africa Company issued revenue stamps for use in all of Rhodesia from 1890 to 1909. The first issue had four values from £1 to £10 and they bore the company's coat of arms. These were issued in the form of postage stamps but due to their high values they never required for postal use so they are regarded by many as purely revenue stamps. In 1896, some of these were surcharged with values between £50 and £200. These are exceedingly rare as few were printed. Later in 1896, a new square design still featuring the coat of arms but with a more ornate frame was issued. This was replaced in 1898 with a design similar to the original 1890 issue but with some differences in the stamp's border. This set included a £100 cherry red value, which is very rare and only six copies of the stamp are known to exist. Around 1907, some of these stamps were overprinted REVENUE to disqualify them from postal use, and in 1909 the £1 to £5 values were overprinted RHODESIA when the company approved this usage on its stamps. These continued to be used until the 1920s.

Around 1905, a set of cigarette excise stamps were issued, and these are rare as they were usually torn upon use.

== Southern Rhodesia ==
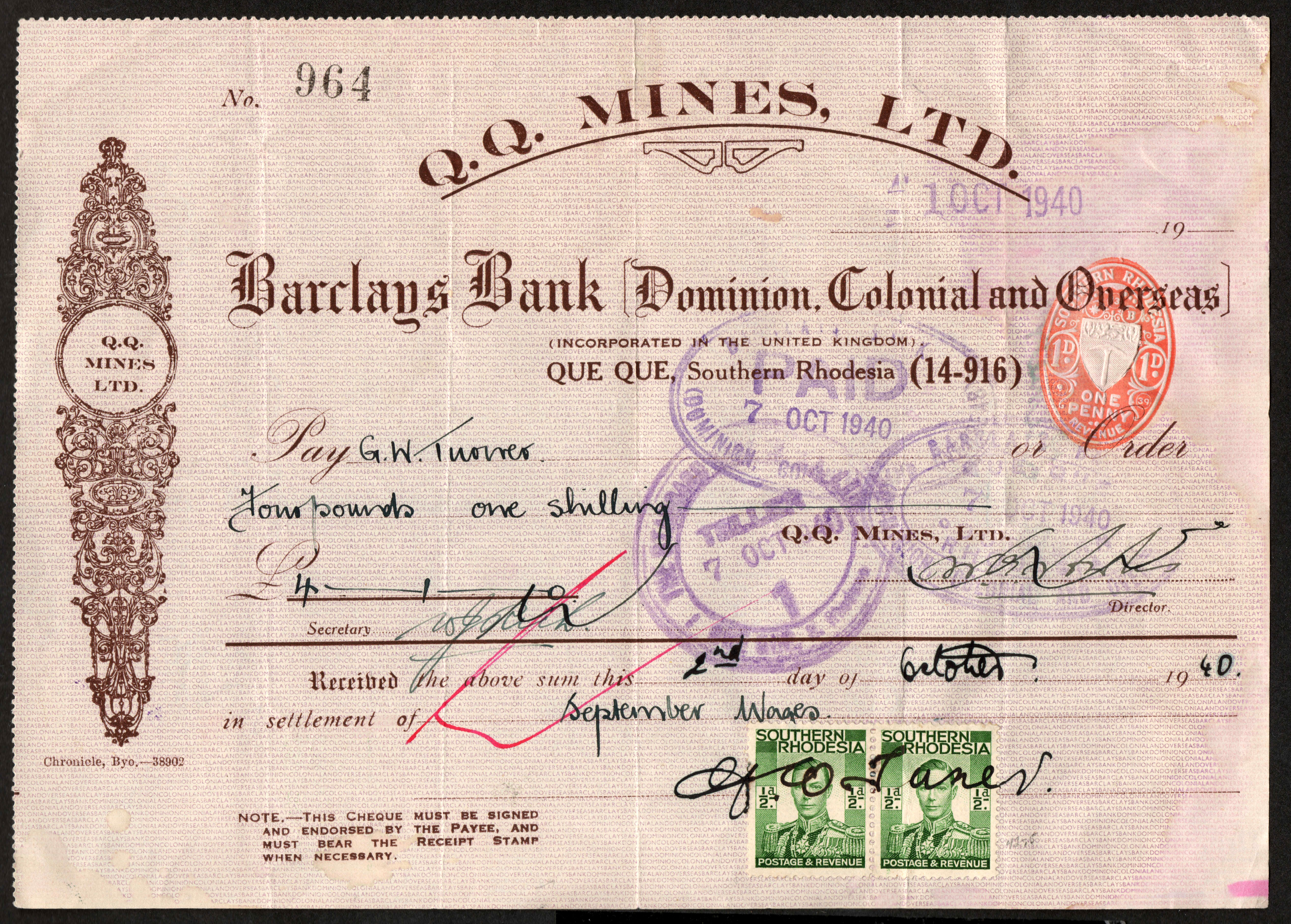
Southern Rhodesian postage and revenue stamps fiscally used on a cheque in 1940.

Southern Rhodesia became a separate colony in 1923, and in 1924 its first revenue issues portraying King George V in a military uniform were issued. These were replaced by a new issue portraying an elderly King George in 1930. Following his death, in 1937 a set showing the new monarch King George VI was issued. This had nine values from 3/- to £50. The rarest value is the 7/6 black as it was withdrawn soon after issue, and genuinely used stamps can now fetch over £3000. In 1954, a large set showing the coat of arms was issued with values ranging from 1d to £50. In the 1930s, banderole excise stamps were used to pay cigarette taxes. From around 1937 to the 1940s, various postage stamps were handstamped EXCISE or E for the same purpose. Between 1961 and 1964 various stamps were issued for Personal Tax. These exist with various roulettes, perforations and combinations of both.

Southern Rhodesia joined the Federation of Rhodesia and Nyasaland and used its revenue stamps from 1953 to 1963.

== Rhodesia ==
Following Rhodesia's Unilateral Declaration of Independence in November 1965, the country assumed independence and issued its first revenues a year later. They used the 1954 Southern Rhodesia design but with altered inscriptions. One of the values - the 6d red and black - is very rare despite it being one of the most commonly used rates as it was the stamp duty tax on cheques. Its rarity is probably because old stocks of Southern Rhodesian revenues continued to be used instead of it. In 1970 the set was reissued denominated in Rhodesian dollars. There were some provisional surcharges made in 1980 just before the country was renamed Zimbabwe.

== Zimbabwe ==
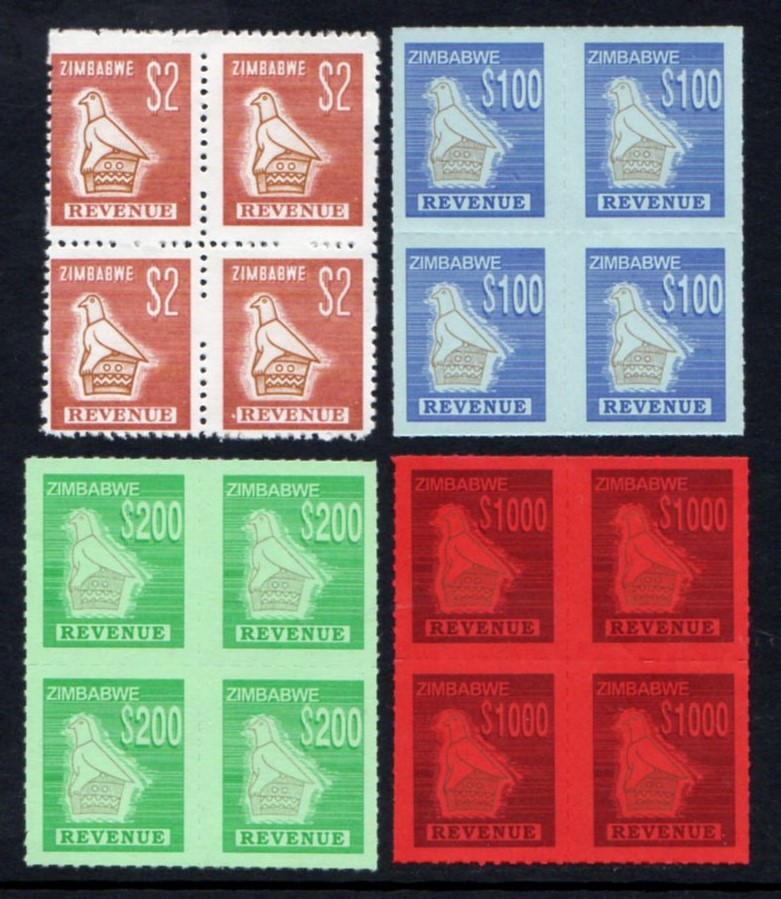
Modern Zimbabwean revenues in blocks of four

In 1980, Rhodesia was renamed Zimbabwe following the end of the civil war. Initially it used Rhodesian revenues with the name obliterated by hand in ink, but in 1981 a new design showing the Zimbabwe Bird was issued. Since around 2000 perforated stamps were withdrawn and replaced by rouletted issues on coloured paper. Due to inflation, these have values up to $200,000.

== Northern Rhodesia ==
Northern Rhodesia became a separate protectorate in 1924, and it issued its first revenue stamps a year later with values from £2 to £50. These portrayed King George V and showed a local scene with giraffes, elephants and other wildlife. These continued to be used until the 1950s. Postage stamps were used for revenue transactions of lower values. In 1953, Queen Elizabeth II postage stamps were overprinted with a large R indicating revenue use. About two years later, the 1925 King George V design was reissued with the portrait of the Queen, this time with values ranging from 1d to £50.

In the 1930s, various cigarette excise stamps were also issued, and an employment stamp featuring the coat of arms was issued around 1962.

Northern Rhodesia joined the Federation of Rhodesia and Nyasaland and used its revenue stamps from 1953 to 1963.

== Zambia ==
Following the dissolution of Rhodesia and Nyasaland in 1963, Northern Rhodesia became independent as Zambia in 1964. Its first revenues were issued in 1964 and depicted the coat of arms. The design was reissued in 1968 denominated in the Zambian kwacha.

== See also ==
- Postage stamps and postal history of Zambia
- Postage stamps and postal history of Zimbabwe
- Revenue stamps of the Federation of Rhodesia and Nyasaland
