= Excise stamp =

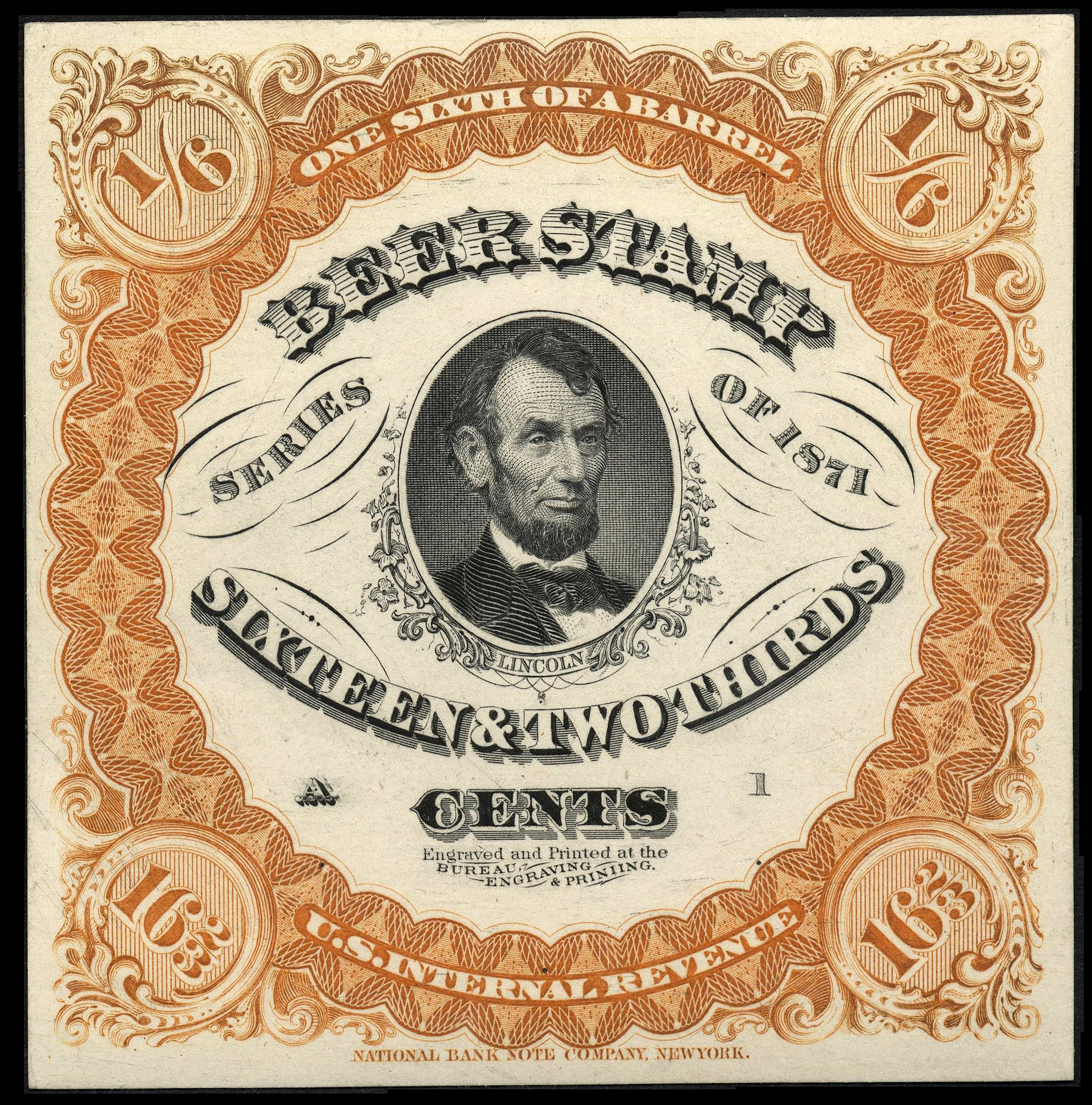
1871 Beer excise stamp

An excise stamp is a type of revenue stamp affixed to some exciseable goods to indicate that the required excise tax has been paid by the manufacturer. They are securities printed by the finance ministry of the relevant country.

== Security measures ==
Excise stamps are often as detailed in their design as banknotes - usually made from the same type of paper and containing holograms and other anti-counterfeit devices. The reason for such measures is that excise duty is extremely expensive, in most EU countries accounting for around half the market price of the product.

== Usage ==
Excise stamps are most commonly found on tobacco and alcohol products, which reach the consumer in neatly packaged units (namely packets and bottles) to which the adhesive stamp is easily affixed. Since counterfeit alcohol and cigarettes are extremely common in many countries, the presence of a genuine excise stamp also goes some way towards guaranteeing the genuineness of the product, as only certified producers may legally buy excise stamps. (However, illegally obtained or counterfeit stamps are common in some countries.)

Manufacturers will buy a certain quantity of excise stamps from the government at their excise value which they are then obliged to affix to every packet of cigarettes or bottle of spirits produced. The excise stamps are ideally affixed with strong glue over the cap of a bottle or across the lid of a box of cigarettes (and underneath the plastic/foil wrapper on the bottleneck or the cellophane of the cigarette-box) in such a way that they are destroyed when the product is opened. This is so that they cannot be reused, since this would constitute contraband.

In countries where excise stamps are required, all cigarettes and alcohol produced legally will bear a stamp. Some countries have separate stamps for domestically-produced and imported excisable goods; others require separate stamps for products destined for duty-free sale, which are still subject to excise but not VAT; some countries do not require stamps for wines, while others do.

== In the United Kingdom ==
In the UK, excise stamps have been in use for spirits since 2006.^{(view image)} While these are usually printed on the back label of the bottle by the manufacturer rather than being a special security bought from the government, they still have to adhere to strict specifications, such as containing UV-visible inks. UK law does not require such physical stamps for cigarettes, either - instead, the words "UK Duty Paid" are printed in bold on all packs as part of the manufacturing process, while other forms of control are implemented by HM Revenue & Customs to verify that this is indeed the case. Meanwhile, foreign-bought cigarette packets bearing revenue stamps can be widely seen across the UK, mainly due to the comparatively high price of British cigarettes, leading people to (often illegally) import them from abroad.

== Gallery ==
Russian excise stamps (2000s)

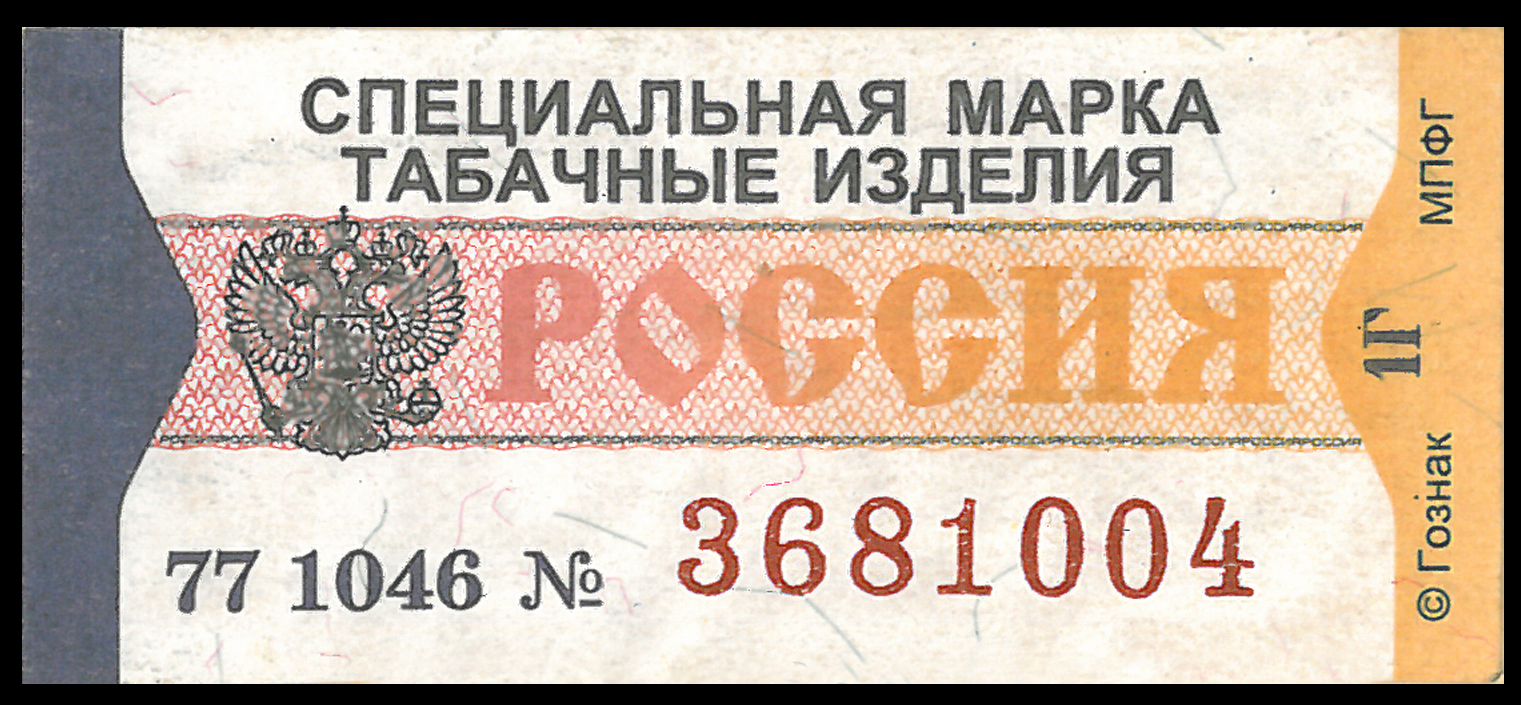
Cigarettes (domestic)

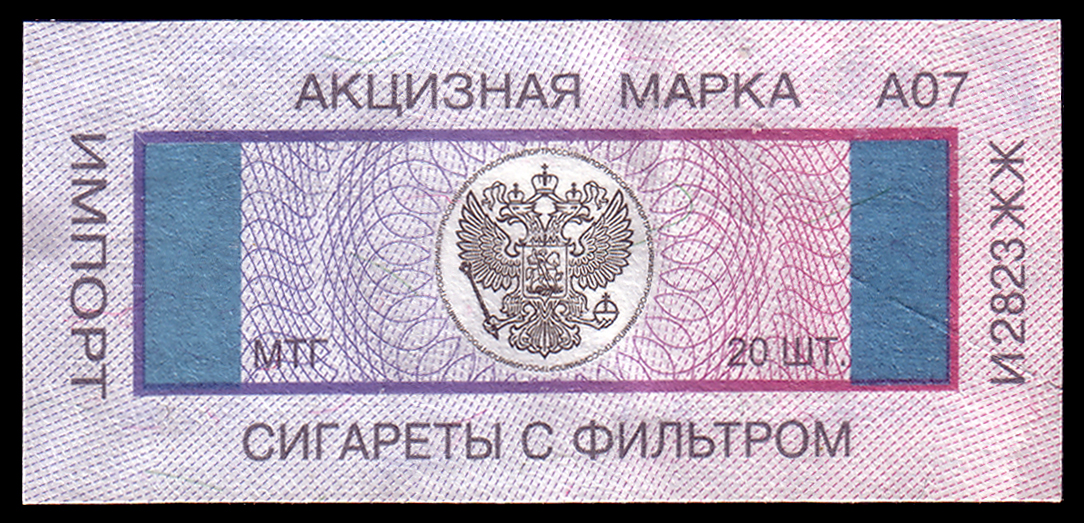
Cigarettes (import)

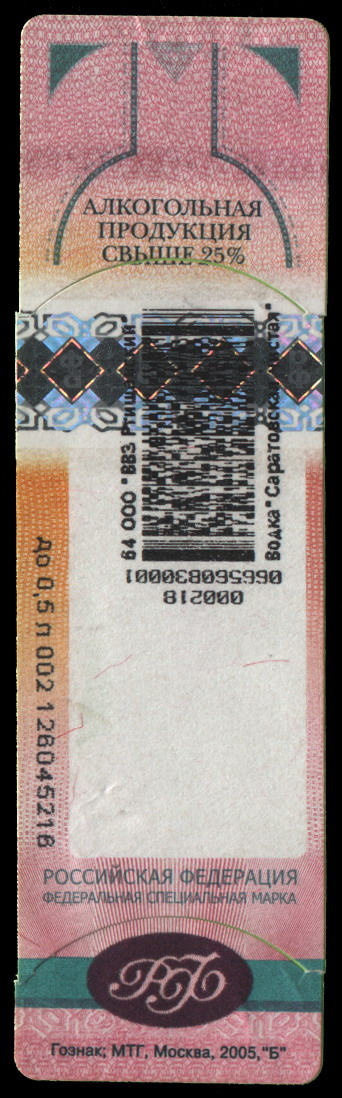
Spirits

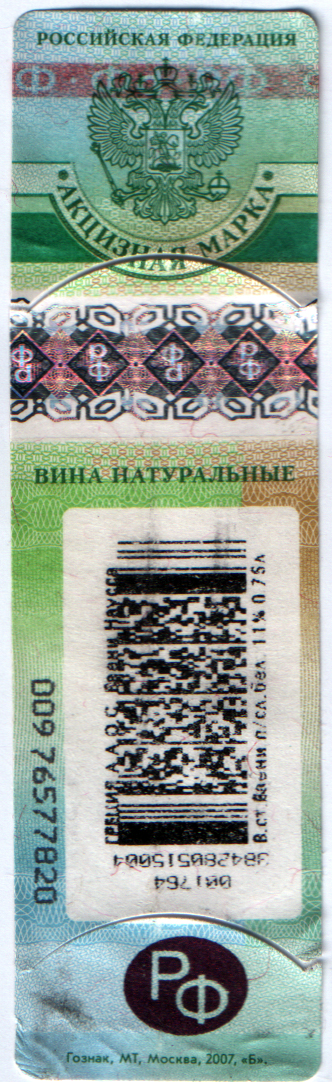
Wines

== See also ==
- Excise stamps of Russia
- Excise stamps of Ukraine
- Tobacco and alcohol revenue stamps
