= List of postal services abroad =

In the latter part of the 19th and early part of the 20th century, a number of countries maintained post offices in foreign countries, arranged by treaty. Most such offices were operated by European powers in the Middle and Far East. They were partly motivated by the desire to provide reliable postal service for merchants and other foreign nationals in major cities, and partly by suspicion of the local postal service. The currency in use could be either the local currency, or that of the home country.

Additionally, it became the practice of occupying military powers to establish postal services in the occupied country.

== List ==
Austrian Post Abroad
Italy (Austrian Occupation) 1918 only
Lombardy-Venetia 1850–1866
Montenegro (Austrian Occupation) 1917 only
Romania (Austrian Occupation) 1917–1918
Serbia (Austrian Occupation) 1916 only
Austro-Hungarian Post in China 1904–1919
Crete (Austro-Hungarian Post) 1903–1914
Austro-Hungarian Post in the Ottoman Empire 1867–1915

Palestine (Austrian Post Offices) 1854–1914

Austro-Hungarian Military Post 1915–1918

Belgian Post Abroad
Eupen and Malmedy (Belgian Occupation) 1920 only
German East Africa (Belgian Occupation) 1916–1918
Germany (Belgian Occupation) 1919–1920

British Post Abroad
British post offices abroad
British post offices in Africa various issues
Baghdad (British Occupation) 1917 only
Bangkok (British Post Office) 1882–1885
Batum (British Occupation) 1919–1920
British Levant 1885–1923
Bushire (British Occupation) 1915 only
Cameroons (British Occupation) 1915 only
China (British Railway Administration) 1901 only
China (British Post Offices) 1917–1930
Crete (British Post Offices) 1898–1899
East Africa Forces 1943–1948
Eastern Arabia (British postal agencies) 1948–1966
Egypt (British Forces) 1932–1943
Eritrea (British Military Administration or British Administration) 1948–1952
German East Africa (British Occupation) 1917 only
Iraq (British Occupation) 1918–1923
Japan (British Post Offices) 1859–1879
Japan (British Commonwealth Occupation Force) 1946–1949
Long Island (British Occupation) 1916 only
Madagascar (British Consular Mail) 1884–1895
Mafia Island (British Occupation) 1915–1916
Malaya (British Military Administration) 1945–1948
Middle East Forces 1942–1947
Morocco Agencies 1898–1957
North Borneo (BMA) 1945 only
Salonika (British Field Office) 1916 only
Sarawak (British Military Administration) 1945 only
Somalia (British Military Administration or British Administration) 1948–1950
Tangier 1927–1957
Tripolitania (British Military Administration or British Administration) 1948–1952

Chinese Post Abroad
Chinese post offices in Tibet 1911–1912

Egyptian Post Abroad
Gaza (Egyptian Occupation) 1948–1967
Jaffa (Egyptian Post Office) 1870–1872

Finnish Post Abroad
Aunus (Finnish Occupation) 1919 only
Eastern Karelia (Finnish Occupation) 1941–1944

French Post Abroad
Andorra (French Offices) 1931 –
Arad (French Occupation) 1919 only
Castelrosso (French Occupation) 1920–1921
Cilicia (French Occupation) 1918–1921
Ethiopia (French Post Offices) 1906–1908
Japan (French Post Offices) 1865–1880
Klaipėda 1923 only
Korce (Koritza) 1917–1919
Madagascar (French Post Offices) 1885–1896
Majunga (French Post Office) 1895 only
Memel (French Administration) 1920–1923
Morocco (French Post Offices) 1862–1914
Syria (French Occupation) 1919–1923
Tangier (French Post Office) 1918–1942
Saar (French Administration) 1920–1935
French post offices abroad
China (French Post Offices) 1894–1922

Tientsin (French Post Office) 1903–1922

Crete (French Post Offices) 1902–1913
Egypt (French Post Offices) 1899–1931

Alexandria (French Post Office) 1899–1931
Port Said (French Post Office) 1899–1931

Zanzibar (French Post Office) 1889–1904
Ottoman Empire (French Post Offices) 1885–1923

Beirut (French Post Office) 1905 only
Dedeagatz (French Post Office) 1893–1914
Kavalla (French Post Office) 1893–1914
Port Lagos (French Post Office) 1893–1898
Vathy (French Post Offices) 1893–1914
Palestine (French Post Offices) 1854–1914

Postage of the Free French Forces in the Levant 1942–1946

German Post Abroad
German Ninth Army Post 1918 only
Albania (German Occupation) 1943–1944
Alsace-Lorraine (German Occupation) 1870–1871
Alsace (German Occupation) 1940–1941
Belgium (German Occupation) 1914–1918
Dalmatia (German Occupation) 1943–1945
Dorpat (German Occupation) 1918 only
Estonia (German Occupation) 1941 only
Laibach (German Occupation) 1943–1945
Latvia (German Occupation) 1941 only
Lithuania (German Occupation) 1941 only
Lorraine (German Occupation) 1940–1941
Luxembourg (German Occupation) 1940–1944
Macedonia (German Occupation) 1944 only
Montenegro (German Occupation) 1943–1945
Ostland (German Occupation) 1941–1945
Poland (German Occupation WWI) 1915–1918
Poland (German Occupation WWII) 1939–1945
Romania (German Occupation) 1917–1918
Serbia (German Occupation) 1941–1944
Ukraine (German Occupation) 1941–1944
Zante (German Occupation) 1943–1945
Zanzibar (German Postal Agency) 1890–1891
China (German Post Offices) 1886–1917
Morocco (German Post Offices) 1899–1917
German post offices in the Ottoman Empire 1884–1914
Postage of German Occupation Forces (WWI) 1914–1918
Postage of German Occupation Forces (WWII) 1939–1945
Eastern Command Area 1916–1918
Western Command Area 1916–1918
Palestine (German Post Offices) 1898–1914

Germany (Allied Occupation)
Baden (French Zone) 1947–1949
Postage of Berlin-Brandenburg in the Russian Zone 1945 only
Postage of Mecklenburg-Vorpommern in the Russian Zone 1945–1946
Postage of North West Saxony in the Russian Zone 1945–1946
Saxony (Russian Zone) 1945–1946
Postage of South East Saxony in the Russian Zone 1945–1946
Thuringia (Russian Zone) 1945–1946
Württemberg (French Zone) 1947–1949
American, British and Russian Zones 1946–1948
Anglo-American Zones (Civil Government) 1948–1949
Anglo-American Zones (Military Government) 1945–1946
French Zone (General Issues) 1945–1946
Postage of the Rhineland – Palatinate in the French Zone 1947–1949
Russian Zone (General Issues) 1948–1949
Saar (French Zone) 1945–1947

Greek Post Abroad
Greek Post Offices in the Turkish Empire 1861–1881
Albania (Greek Occupation) 1940–1941
Kavalla (Greek Occupation) 1913 only
Khios (Greek Occupation) 1913 only
Lemnos (Greek Occupation) 1912–1913
Lesbos (Greek Occupation) 1912–1913
Dodecanese Islands (Greek Occupation) 1947 only

Indian Overseas Forces
Gaza (Indian UN Force) 1965 only
Indo-China (Indian Forces) 1954–1968
Korea (Indian Custodian Forces) 1953 only
Mosul (Indian Forces) 1919 only
Congo (Indian UN Force) 1962 only
China Expeditionary Force 1900–1923
Indian Expeditionary Forces 1914–1922

Indo-Chinese Post in China
Canton (Indo-Chinese Post Office) 1901–1922
China (Indo-Chinese Post Offices) 1900–1922
Hoi-Hao (Indo-Chinese Post Office) 1902–1922
Kouang-Tcheou 1898–1943
Mong-Tseu (Indo-Chinese Post Office) 1903–1922
Pakhoi (Indo-Chinese Post Office) 1903–1922
Tchongking (Indo – Chinese Post Office) 1903–1922
Yunnanfu (Indo-Chinese Post Office) 1903–1922

Israeli Post Abroad
Golan (Israeli Post Offices) 1967 –
Sinai (Israeli Post Offices) 1967–1982
West Bank and Gaza (Israeli Post Offices) 1967 –

Italian Post Abroad
Albania (Italian Occupation) 1939–1943
Austria (Italian Occupation) 1918-1919
Benghazi (Italian Post Office) 1901–1912
Cephalonia and Ithaca (Italian Occupation) 1941 only
Corfu and Paxos (Italian Occupation) 1941 only
Corfu (Italian Occupation) 1923 only
Dalmatia (Italian Occupation) 1919–1923
Ethiopia (Italian Occupation) 1936 only
Lubiana (Italian Occupation) 1941 only
Montenegro (Italian Occupation) 1941–1943
Saseno (Italian Occupation) 1923 only
Trentino (Italian Occupation) 1918–1919
Tripoli (Italian Post Office) 1909–1912
Venezia Giulia (Italian Occupation) 1918–1919
Fiume and Kupa Zone 1941–1942
Ionian Islands (Italian Occupation) 1941–1943
Italian post offices in Africa
Italian post offices in China

Pechino (Italian Post Office) 1917–1922
Tientsin (Italian Post Office) 1917–1922

Italian post offices in Crete

Khania (Italian Post Office) 1900–1912

Italian post offices in Egypt
Italian post offices in the Ottoman Empire 1873–1923

Constantinople (Italian Post Office) 1908–1923
Durazzo (Italian Post Office) 1902–1916
Jannina (Italian Post Office) 1909–1911
Salonika (Italian Post Office) 1909–1911
Scutari (Italian Post Office) 1909–1915
Smirne (Italian Post Office) 1909–1911
Valona (Italian Post Office) 1909–1916
Palestine (Italian Post Offices) 1908–1914

Japanese Post Abroad
Brunei (Japanese Occupation) 1942–1945
Burma (Japanese Occupation) 1942–1945
Central China (Japanese Occupation) 1941–1944
Honan (Japanese Occupation) 1941
Hong Kong (Japanese Occupation) 1945 only
Hopei (Japanese Occupation) 1941
Inner Mongolia (Japanese Occupation) 1941–1943
Japanese Taiwan (Formosa) 1945 only
Java (Japanese Occupation) 1943–1945
Kelantan (Japanese Occupation) 1942–1945
Korea (Japanese Post Offices) 1900–1901
Kwangtung (Japanese Occupation) 1942–1945
Malaya (Japanese Occupation) 1942–1945
Manchukuo 1932–1945
Mengkiang (Japanese Occupation) 1942–1945
Nangking and Shanghai (Japanese Occupation) 1941–1945
North Borneo (Japanese Occupation) 1942–1945
North China (Japanese Occupation) 1942–1945
Sarawak (Japanese Occupation) 1942–1945
Shansi (Japanese Occupation) 1941
Shantung (Japanese Occupation) 1941
South China (Japanese Occupation) 1942
Sumatra (Japanese Occupation) 1943–1945
Supeh (Japanese Occupation) 1941
Japanese post in occupied China 1941–1942
Philippines (Japanese Occupation) 1942–1945
China (Japanese Post Offices) 1900–1922
Japanese Naval Control Area 1942–1943

Jordanian Post Abroad
Egypt and Jordan 1948–1967

North Korean Post Abroad
South Korea (North Korean Occupation) 1950 only

Polish Post Abroad
Central Lithuania (Polish Occupation) 1920–1922
Constantinople (Polish Post Office) 1919–1921
Danzig (Polish Post Office) 1924–1939
Polish post offices in the Turkish Empire
Polish Army in Russia 1942 only
Polish Corps in Russia 1918 only
Polish Government in Exile 1941–1945

Romanian Post Abroad
Banat Bacska (Romanian Occupation) 1919–1920
Constantinople (Romanian Post Office) 1896, 1919–1922/23
Debrecen (Romanian Occupation) 1919–1920
Hungary (Romanian Occupation) 1919–1920
Temesvar (Romanian Occupation) 1919 only
Transylvania (Romanian Occupation) 1919 only
Romanian post offices in the Turkish Empire 1896–1919

Russian Post Abroad
North Korea (Russian Occupation) 1946–1948
South Lithuania (Russian Occupation) 1919 only
Russian post offices abroad
China (Russian Post Offices) 1899–1920
Crete (Russian Post Offices) 1899 only
Russian post offices in the Ottoman Empire 1863–1914

Beirut (Russian Post Office) 1879–1910
Constantinople (Russian Post Office) 1909–1910
Dardanelles (Russian Post Office) 1909–1910
Kerrasunde (Russian Post Office) 1909–1910
Mount Athos (Russian Post Office) 1909–1914
Mytilene (Russian Post Office) 1909–1914
Rizeh (Russian Post Office) 1909–1910
Salonika (Russian Post Office) 1909–1914
Smyrne (Russian Post Office) 1909–1910
Trebizonde (Russian Post Office) 1909–1910
Palestine (Russian Post Offices) 1868–1914

Serbian Post Abroad
Baranya (Serbian Occupation) 1919 only
Hungary (Serbian Occupation) 1919 only
Temesvar (Serbian Occupation) 1919 only

Spanish Post Abroad
Andorra (Spanish Offices) 1928 –
Morocco (Spanish Post Offices) 1903–1914
Tangier (Spanish Post Offices) 1921–1957
Tetuan (Spanish Post Office) 1908–1909

Thai Post Abroad
Malaya (Thai Occupation) 1943–1945

Togo (Allied Occupation)
Togo (Anglo-French Occupation) 1914–1919

Turkish Post Abroad
Thessaly (Turkish Occupation) 1898 only

US Post Abroad
Guam (US Administration) 1899–1901
US post in Japan 1867–1874
Shanghai (US Postal Agency) 1919–1922
Philippines (US Administration) 1899–1945

== See also ==
- Extraterritorial Office of Exchange
- List of postal entities
- Articles about postal systems by country, postal organisations by country

== Bibliography ==
- Stanley Gibbons Ltd, various catalogues
- Stanley Gibbons Ltd, Europe and Colonies 1970, Stanley Gibbons Ltd, 1969
- Rossiter, Stuart & John Flower. The Stamp Atlas. London: Macdonald, 1986. ISBN 0-356-10862-7
- XLCR Stamp Finder and Collector's Dictionary, Thomas Cliffe Ltd, c.1960
