= French post offices abroad =

Former network of French Post offices in foreign countries

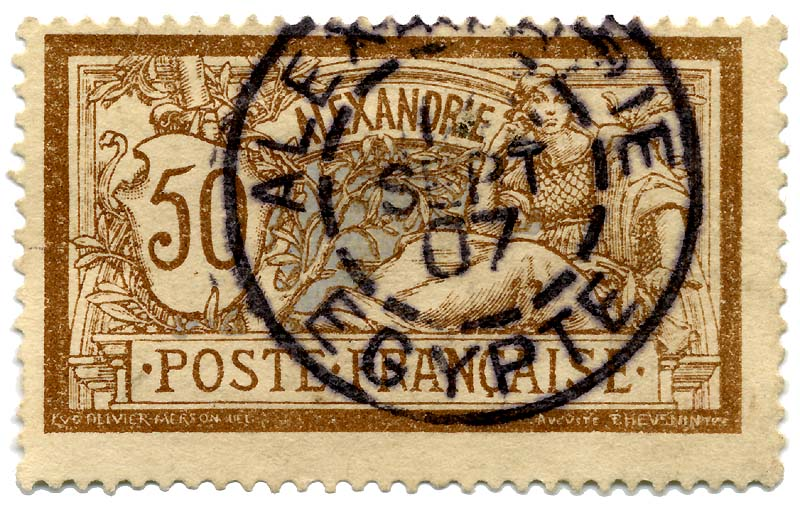
A French Merson type stamp for use in the city of Alexandria in Egypt.

The French post offices abroad were a global network of post offices in foreign countries established by France to provide mail service where the local services were deemed unsafe or unreliable. They were generally set up in cities with some sort of French commercial interest.

They started appearing in the early 19th century, reached their heyday at the beginning of the 20th century, then started closing down in the 1910s and 1920s, with the office at Kwangchou in China holding out until the 1940s.

Offices abroad:

- French post offices in China
- French post offices in Crete
- French post offices in Egypt
- French post offices in the Ottoman Empire
- French post offices in Zanzibar

== Sources ==
- Stanley Gibbons Ltd: various catalogues
- AskPhil – Glossary of Stamp Collecting Terms
- Encyclopaedia of Postal History
- Rossiter, Stuart & John Flower. The Stamp Atlas. London: Macdonald, 1986. ISBN 0-356-10862-7
