= French post offices in the Ottoman Empire =

Postal Office Operated in The Ottoman Empire By French Post

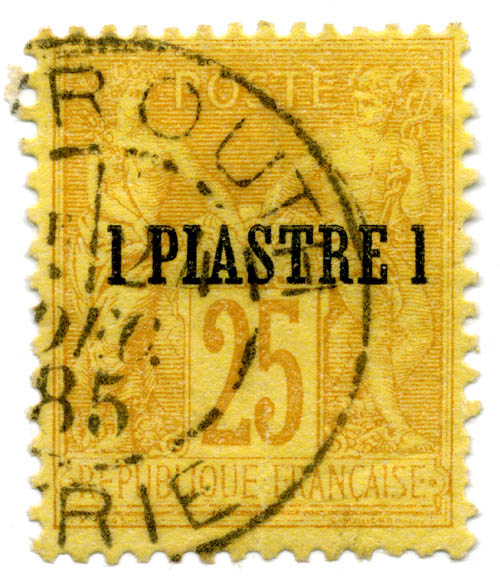
1 piaster overprint on 25-centime Type Sage, used at Beirut in December 1885

The French post offices in the Ottoman Empire were post offices in various cities of the Ottoman Empire run by France between 1812 and 1923. France was one of a half-dozen European countries, the others being Austria, Russia, Great Britain, Germany and Italy, which had been granted the right to maintain post offices within the Empire. This privilege was distinct from the so-called "Capitulations" which, since the 16th century, had been negotiated with a much larger number of countries and which granted some extraterritorial rights to citizens and commercial enterprises of those countries. Initially restricted to consular mail, these post offices could soon be used by foreign and local businesses and individuals, provided they used the postage stamps of the post office concerned. The system came to end with the Treaty of Lausanne in 1923.

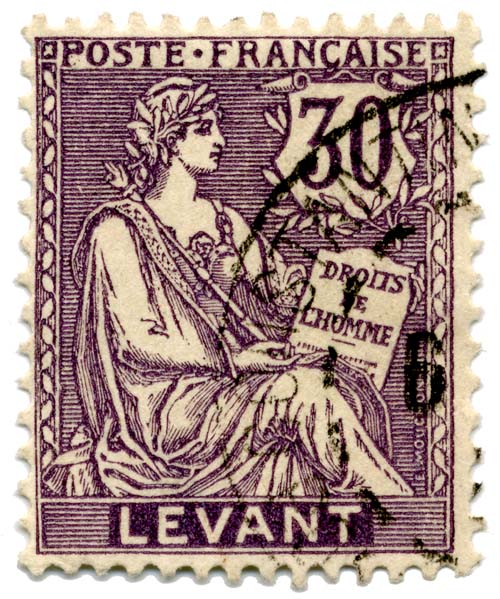
30c, 1902

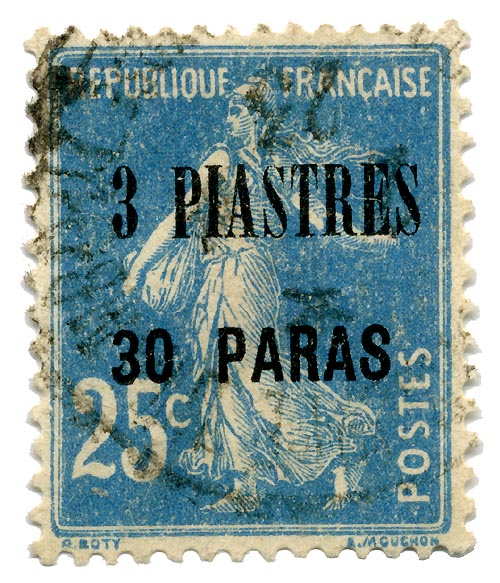
3-piaster 30-para overprint on French 25c

Originally, the post office used postage stamps of France, but these were denominated in centimes and francs instead of the local piasters, so beginning in 1885, some French stamps were surcharged in piasters, at a rate of four piasters to the franc.

Beginning in 1902, stamps of the Blanc, Mouchon and Merson series were issued with the inscription "LEVANT", both as centime/franc, and with higher values surcharged in piasters. In 1905, 15c stamps in Beirut were surcharged with "1 Piastre / Beyrouth".

World War I forced the closure of all the post offices on 13 October 1914. After the war, only the office in Istanbul reopened, operating from August 1921 to July 1923. Stamps of France were again surcharged, with values from 30 paras to 75 piasters.

== Post offices ==
- Alexandretta
- Beirut
- Candia (now Iraklion)
- Canea (now Chania)
- Castellorizo
- Cavalle
- Constantinople
- Dedeagh
- Galata
- Gallipoli
- Jaffa
- Jerusalem
- Kustendje (now Constanţa)
- Latakia
- Mersin
- Port Lagos
- Rhodes
- Rodosto
- Salonica
- Sinope
- Smyrna
- Sulina
- Trebizond
- Tripoli
- Tulcea
- Varna
- Vathy
- Volos

Four post offices also issued their own stamps between 1893 and 1903: Cavalle (present-day Kavala), Dedeagh (Dedeagatch, present-day Alexandroupoli), Port Lagos, and Vathy (Samos).

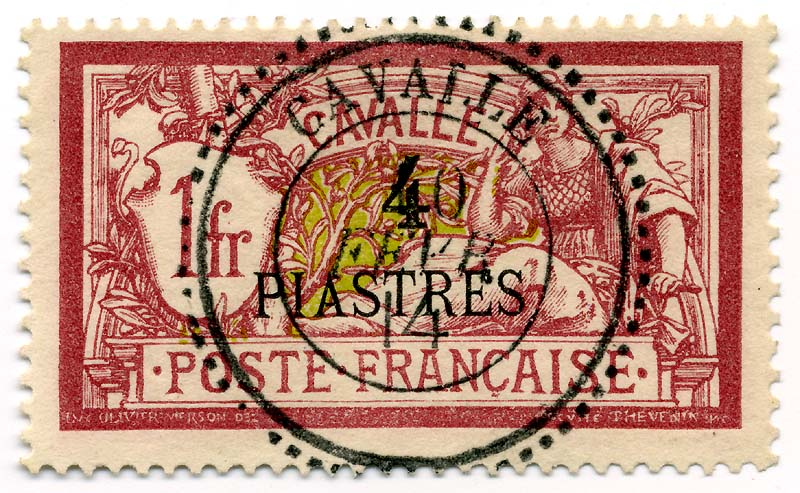
Cavalle 4pi

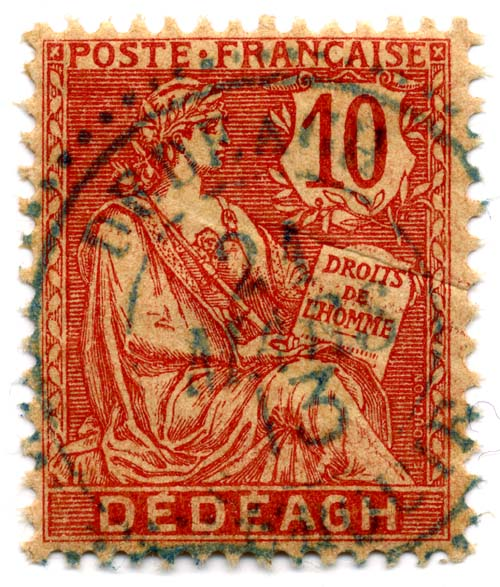
Dedeagh 10c, postmarked 21 March 1913

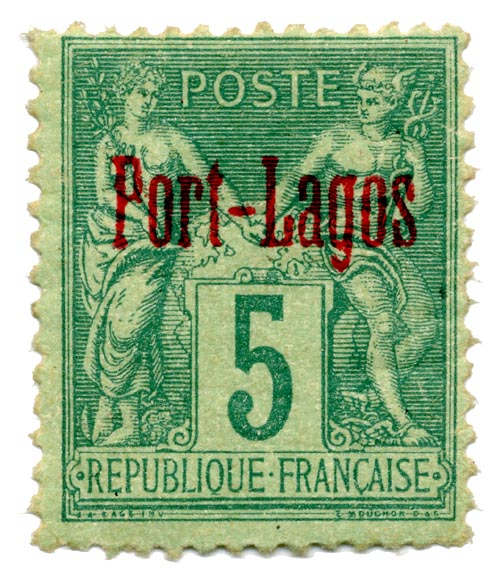
Port Lagos overprint on 5c

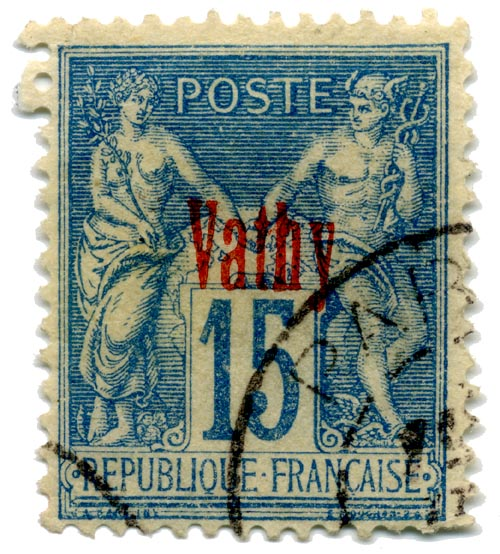
Vathy overprint on 15c

== See also ==
- French post offices abroad
- French post offices in Crete
- French post offices in Egypt
