= Lietuvos paštas =

Lietuvos paštas Lithuanian Post

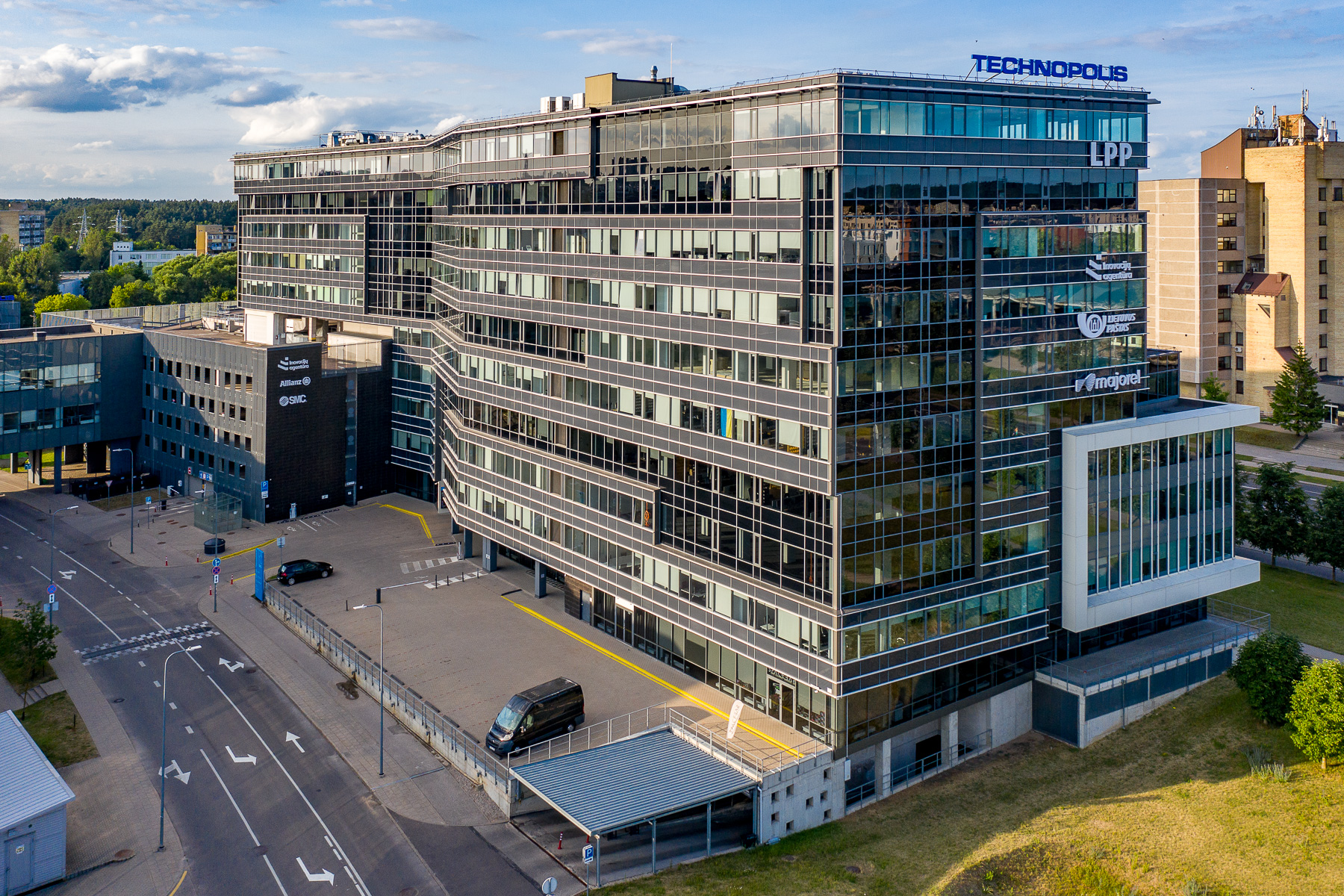
- Headquarters of Lietuvos Paštas
- Type: Government-linked company
- Founded: 16 November 1918 (re-established)
- Headquarters: Vilnius, Lithuania
- Key people: Kastytis Valantinas (CEO)
- Services: Letter post, parcel service, EMS, delivery
- Revenue: ▲€99.370 million (2024)
- Operating income: ▼€0.480 million (2024)
- Net income: ▼€0.242 million (2024)
- Owner: Ministry of Finance
- Number of employees: 2 609 (2024)
- Website: post.lt

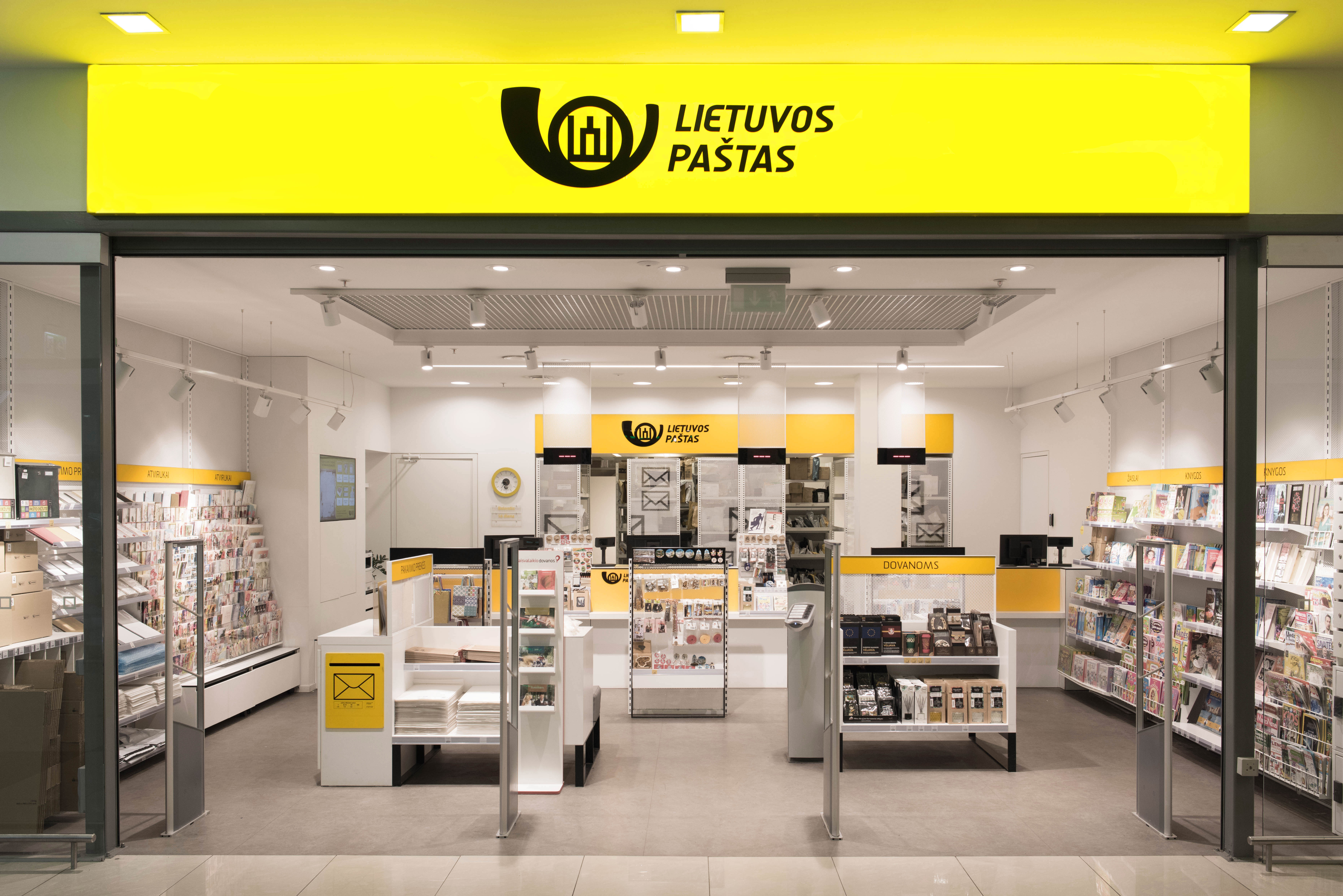
Post office in a shopping mall

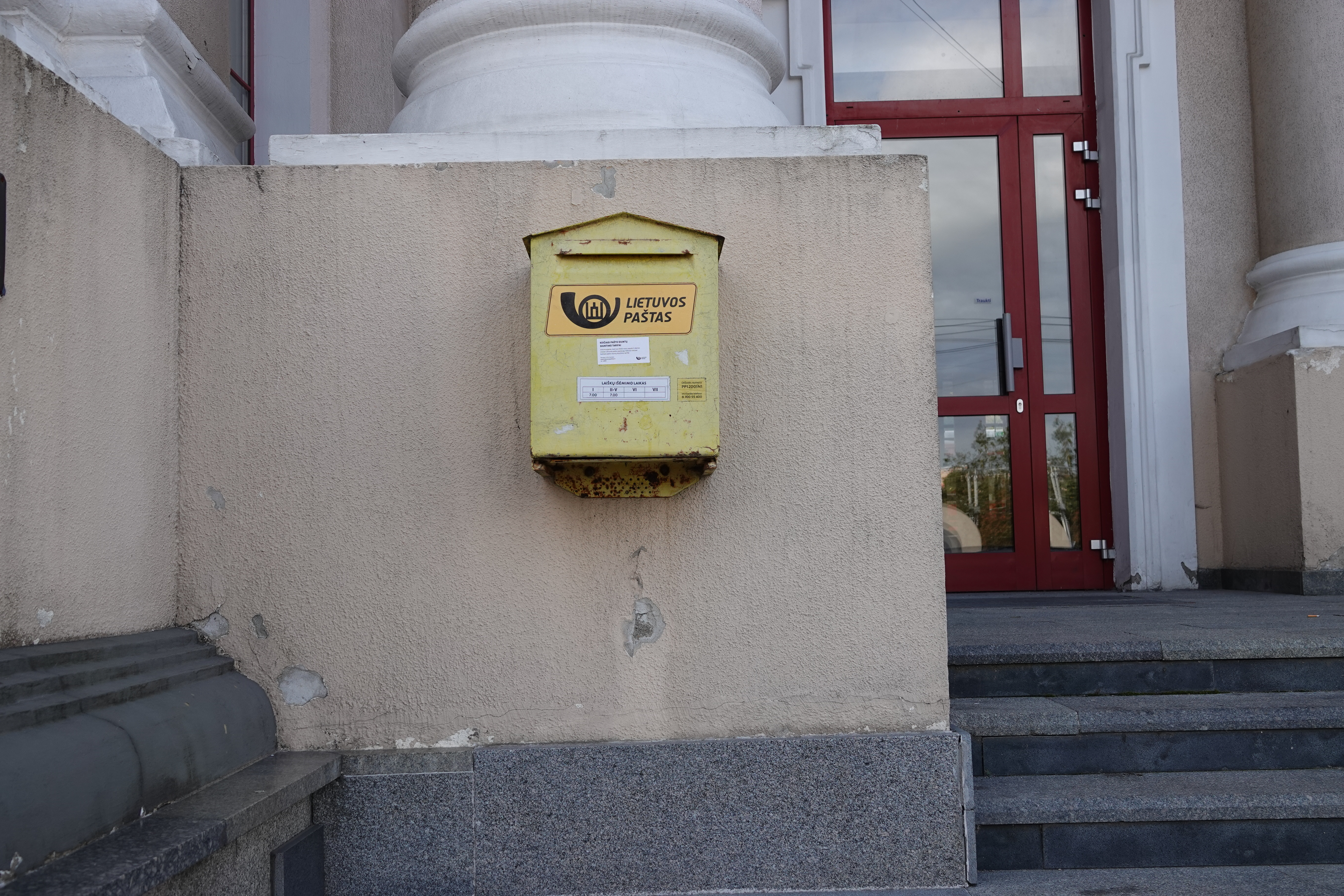
A post box on the Vilnius railway station

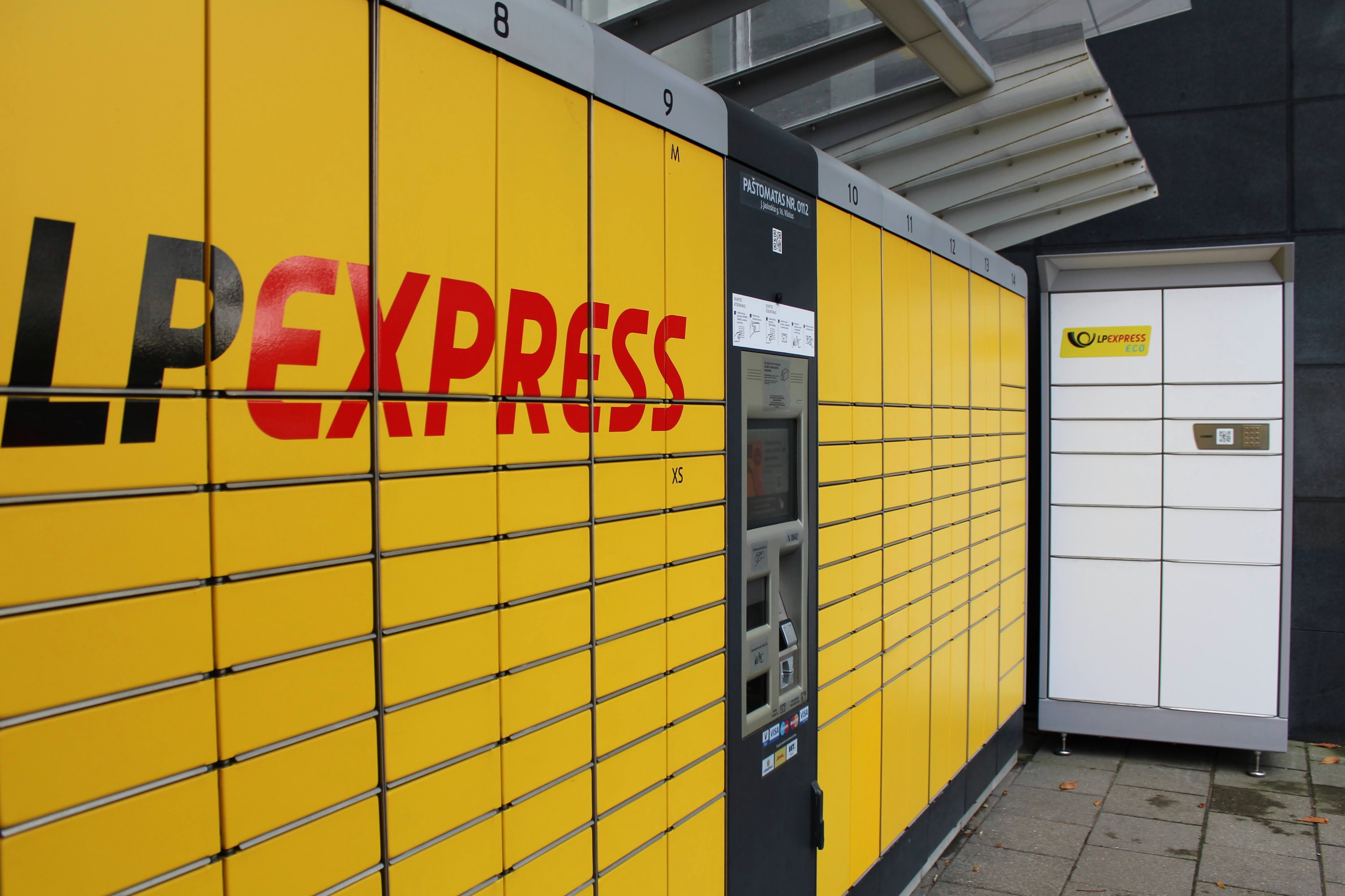
A postal machine to pick up parcels in Lithuania

Lietuvos paštas (Lithuanian pronunciation: [/ˈlʲiətʊvos ˈpaʃtɐs/], lit. 'Lithuanian Post') is the company responsible for postal service in Lithuania. The company was re-established on 16 November 1918, and this date is celebrated as Post Lithuania day.

In 2018, Lithuanian Post consisted of 546 fixed post offices, 85 mobile service locations and 120 smart postmen in 12 districts.

== History ==
On 11 July 1562, the Grand Duke of Lithuania and the King of Poland Sigismund Augustus commissioned Christopher Taxis to organise a regular mail transport route Vilnius-Kraków-Vienna-Venice. At that time, letters between Kraków and Vilnius were delivered in 7 days. The importance of post increased after 1583, when the King-Grand Duke Stephen Báthory enforced standardised mail charges, thus providing universal access to mail. At that time, mail began to be delivered on a regular basis.

On 16 November 1918, the Lithuanian Ministry of Finance, Trade and Industry minister Martynas Yčas signed a decree establishing a Lithuanian postal board. This date is considered the official founding day of Lithuanian postal history and is celebrated as National Post Day. During the Soviet occupation, the Lithuanian Post activities were taken over by the Soviet authorities.

On 7 October 1990, the mail came into circulation once again with the release of the first independent Lithuanian stamp series – "Angel". On 17 December 1991, Lithuania decided to reorganise the management structure of national communications, separating postal and electrical connections and forming two separate state enterprises: Lithuanian Post and Lietuvos Telekomas acting as the public telephony operator. In 2006, the company was reorganised into a joint stock company.

The group of companies of Lietuvos paštas, which has the widest network of access points to services in the country, provides not only postal services, but also services of logistics, financial intermediation, and electronic services.

== Board ==
All shares of AB Lietuvos paštas are controlled by the State represented by the Ministry of Transport and Communications of the Republic of Lithuania.

The Company’s managerial body is the General Meeting of Shareholders, the Board and CEO. The Board consists of five members elected by the General Meeting of Shareholders for a term of four years.

FULL NAME	POSITION	POSITION WITH THE BOARD
Nerijus Datkūnas	Management Consultant, Chairman Of The Board at UAB „Investment and Business Guarantees“, President at Association of Financial Analysts.	Chairman of the Board
Gražvydas Jukna	Commercial Director at „UAB „Vilniaus duona“.	Member
Danielius Merkinas	Commercial Director at „NNL LT“.	Member
Žaneta Kovaliova	Managing Director at „UP Consulting Group“	Member
Darius Kuliešius	Senior Adviser to the Budget and State Property Management Department of the Ministry of Transport and Communications.	Member
