= British post offices in Crete =

British postal service in Crete (1898–1899)

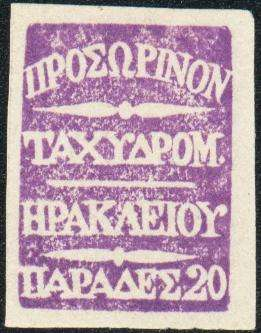
20-para stamp of the British administration in Crete issued in 1898 and inscribed in Greek

British post offices in Crete provided the postal service in the territory of the island of Crete. Stamps inscribed in Greek were used in the British sphere of administration (Heraklion) during the Great Powers occupation of the island in 1898–1899.

== Postal history ==
In 1898 Crete obtained autonomy under Ottoman suzerainty. The Cretan State was under international guarantee and protection; after the departure of the Ottoman garrison, it was garrisoned by an international military force from Britain, France, Italy and Russia and every force controlled one district.

British post offices were established by the military administration in the district under British control, but they never operated. They were in Heraklion and in 9 villages. The postmarks are HPAKΛEION, AΓ. ΘΩMAΣ, AΓ. MYPON, APXANAIΣ, EΠIΣKOΠH, KAΣΤΈΛΛΊ, MOIPAIΣ, MOXOΣ, XAPAKAΣ and XEPΣONHΣOΣ.

== Stamp issues ==
Britain issued 5 postage stamps inscribed in Greek. The stamps had face values in Ottoman Turkish paras (1 piastre = 40 paras) using the word ΠAPAΔEΣ. The first one, a hand struck issue, is shown on the picture above. In 1898 a blue 10 paras and a green 20 paras followed, and in 1899 a brown 10 paras and a red 20 paras, all lithographic issues.

Formerly it was thought that mail was forwarded via the Austrian office at Heraklion with an Austrian CANDIA postmark, because a very few surviving envelopes and some British stamps bear the postmarks of both the British agencies and the Austrian post office in Candia. But nearly all mail from British people in Crete during the period bears only Austrian stamps, and there is no proof that the British stamps had international validity or that there was a British postal service in Crete. Full sheets of stamps 2-5 have been pre-cancelled with the HPAKEION postmark. Nevertheless, the rare franked covers and the stamps themselves remain attractive for the collectors.

== See also ==
- Austrian post offices in Crete
- French post offices in Crete
- International Squadron (Crete intervention, 1897-1898)
- List of British post offices abroad
- Postage stamps and postal history of Crete
- Postage stamps and postal history of Great Britain
- Russian post offices in Crete
