= Type Sage =

Postage stamp

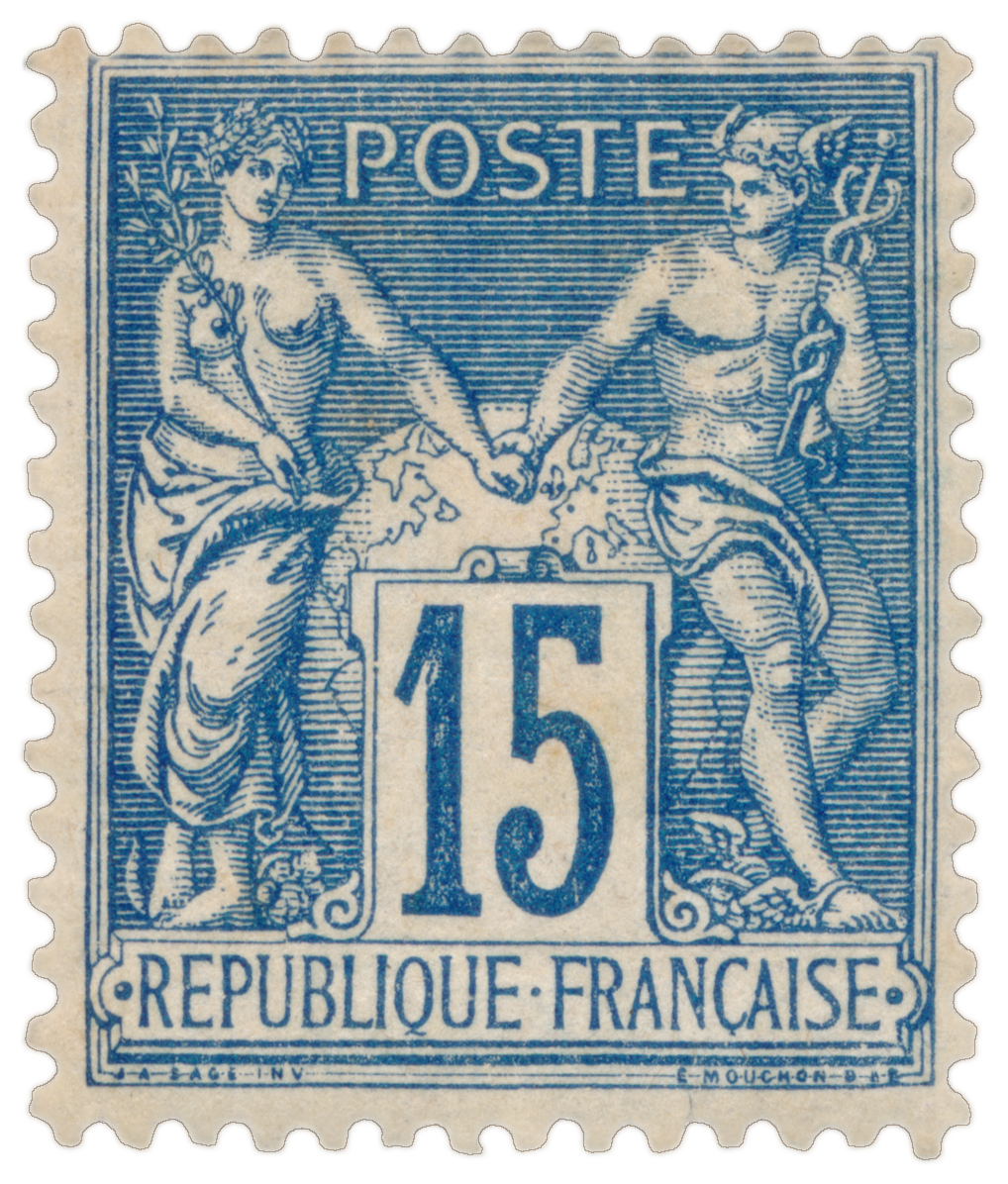
An 1892 "Type Sage/Peace and Commerce" stamp

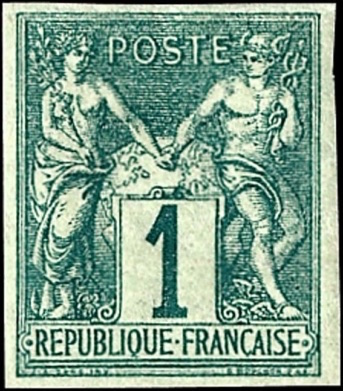
An imperforate "Type Sage/Peace and Commerce" stamp for French colonies

"Type Sage" (also referred to as "Peace and Commerce") is a reference to the definitive series of postage stamps issued by the post office of France between 1876 and 1900. Printed in a variety of colors and shades, the two central figures are allegories of Peace (left) and Commerce (right), giving rise to the name of the series. The name "Type Sage" comes from the tendency of French stamp collectors to refer to the series by the name of the designer of the artwork, in this case Jules Auguste Sage, whose name appears as "J. A. SAGE INV" along the lower left edge of the stamp beneath the word "REPUBLIQUE" of "REPUBLIQUE FRANCAISE."

The Type Sage or Peace and Commerce series is one of the more extensive definitive series from the late 19th century. The Scott Catalogue notes 44 different stamps in this series, ranging in face value from 1 centime to 5 francs, not counting overprints and minor varieties.

Stamps of this design issued with perforations were used in France proper and were also used at French post offices abroad. No stamps specifically prepared for use overseas were created until the mid- to late-1890s, when stamps of this series were overprinted in a variety of styles prior to sale.

Stamps of this design issued as imperforates were prepared for use in French colonies which did not issue their own distinctive stamps at the time.

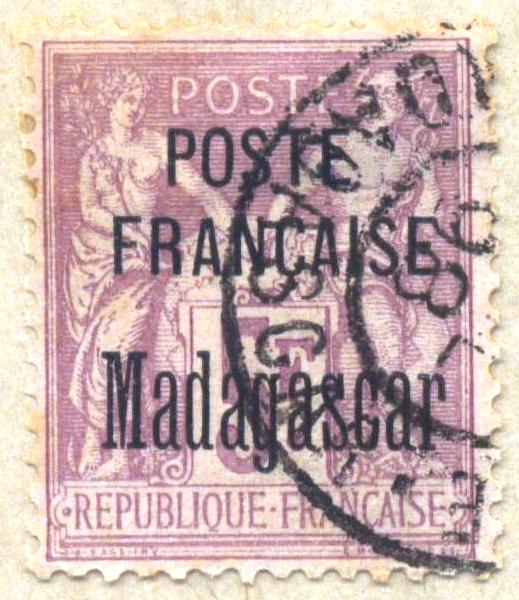
Madagascar

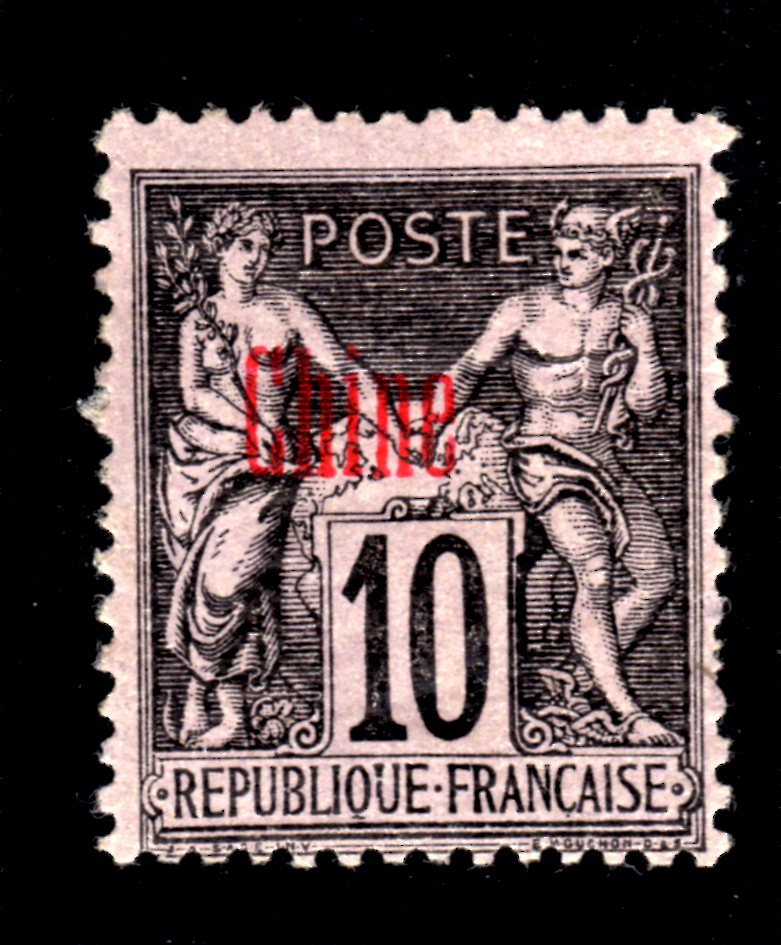
French post offices in China

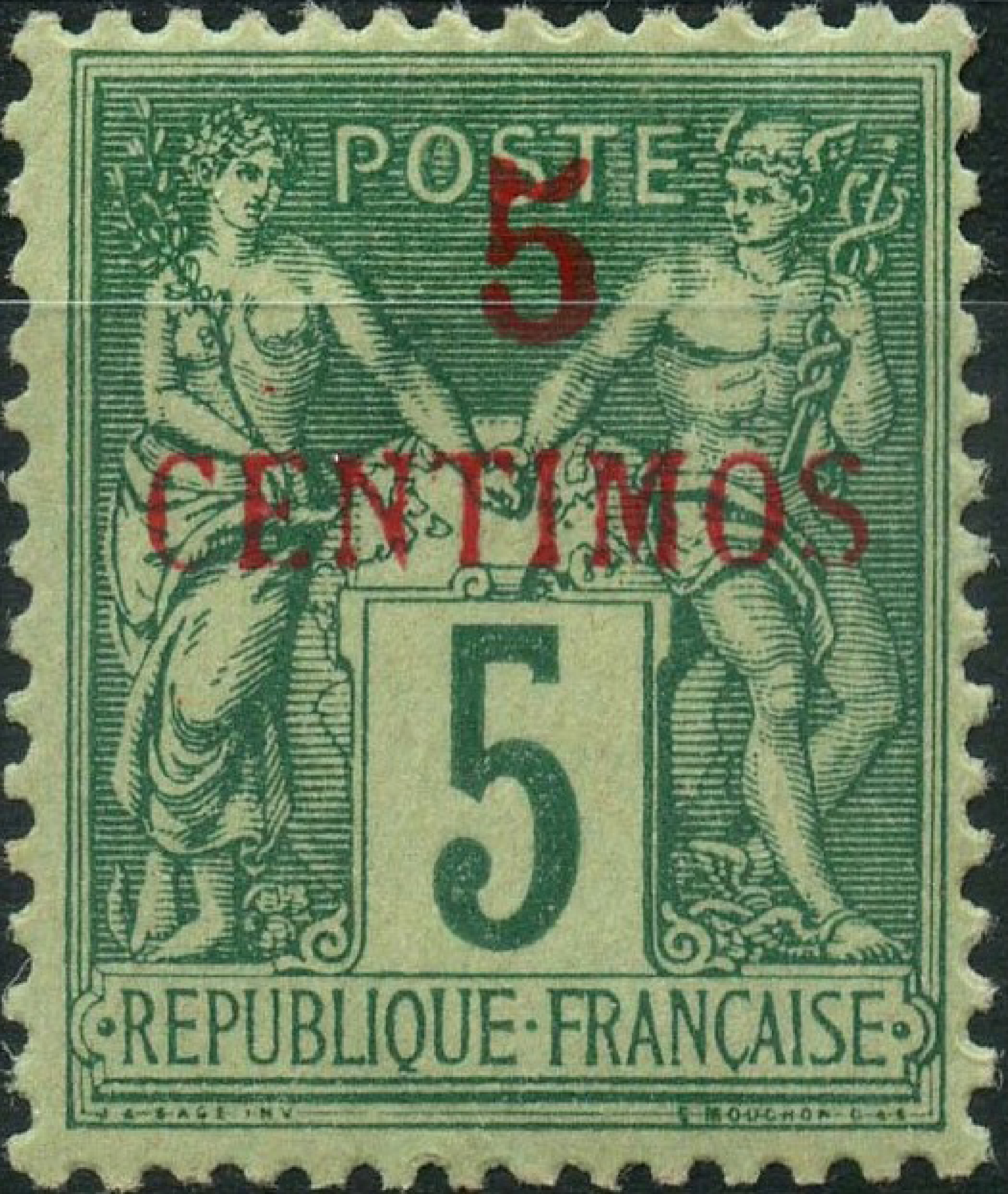
French post offices in Morocco

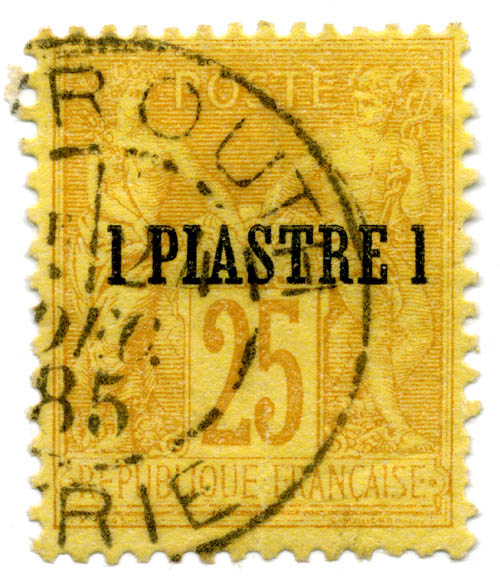
French post offices in the Ottoman Empire

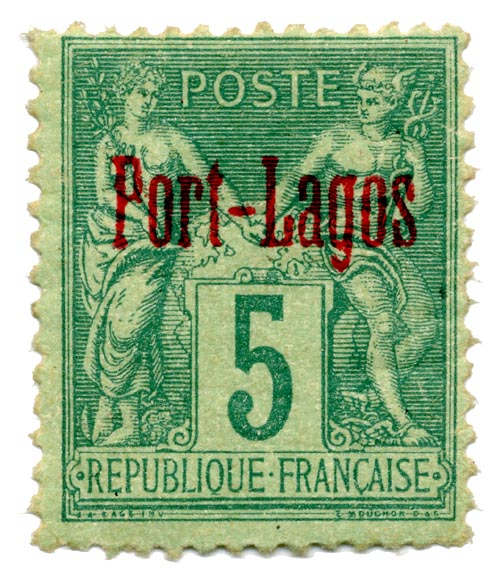
French post offices in Port Lagos

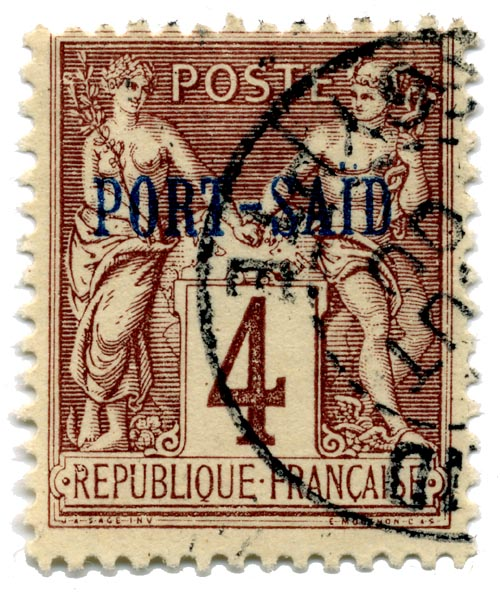
French post offices in Port Said

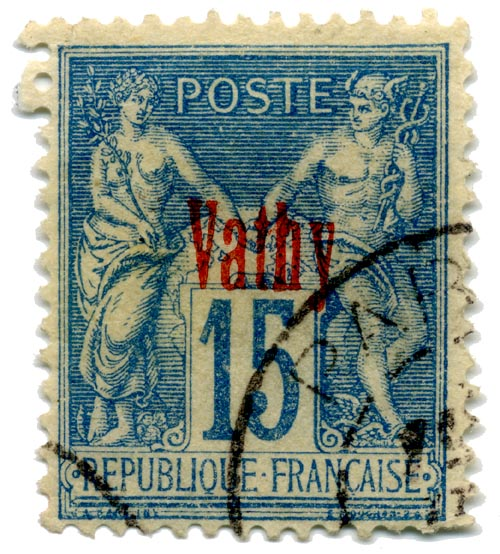
French post offices in Vathy

== Sources ==
- Scott Catalogue: various catalogues
- Yvert et Tellier: various catalogues
