= Postage stamps and postal history of Montenegro =

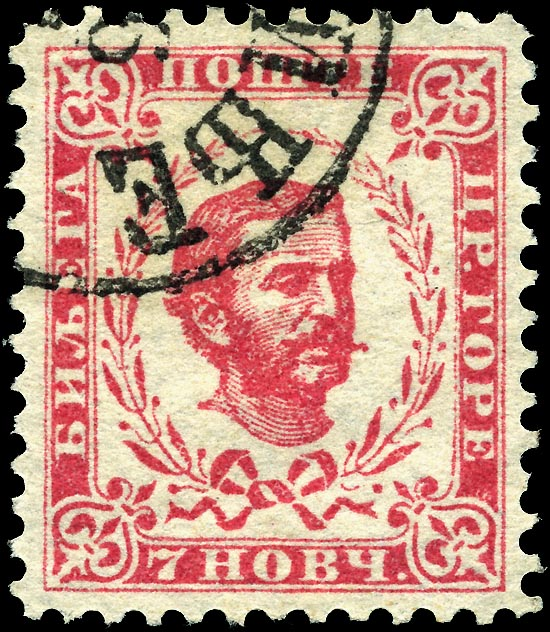
An 1874 stamp of Montenegro

This is a survey of the postage stamps and postal history of Montenegro.

== Early postal history ==
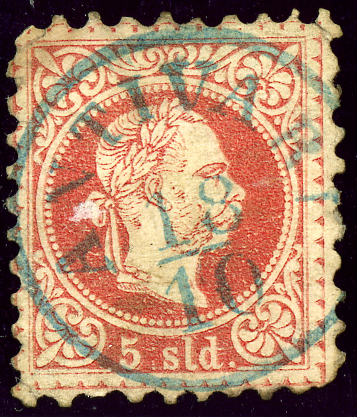
Austrian stamp cancelled at Antivari

During the first part of the 19th century private letters from Montenegro are very rare. It is mainly official and ecclesiastical letters carried by couriers that are to be found.

== Austrian post offices ==
In 1854 an Austrian Post Office, operated by Österreichischer Lloyd, was opened in Antivari, then in the Ottoman Empire, now known as Bar; this office was closed in 1878 when the town was returned to Montenegro. The stamps used during this period were the issues for Austrian post offices in the Ottoman Empire.

== First stamps of Montenegro ==
The first stamps to be issued by Montenegro were in 1874 which coincided with the opening of the first post office for public use. The design of the stamps had a bust of Prince Nicholas.

In 1893 seven different values of the existing stamps were overprinted to commemorate the 400th Anniversary of introduction of printing into Montenegro. In 1896 a range of 12 stamps were issued for the bicentenary of the Petrović-Njegoš dynasty. 1902 saw the introduction of new currency and new stamps with a new design and a new bust of Prince Nicholas.

Montenegro was one of the few European countries to issue a stamp for the Avis de réception service.

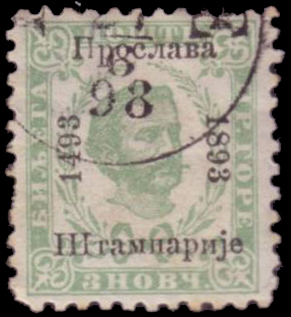
An 1874 stamp of Montenegro commemorating the 400th Anniversary of introduction of printing

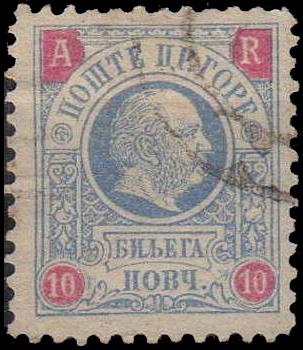
An 1895 Avis de Réception stamp

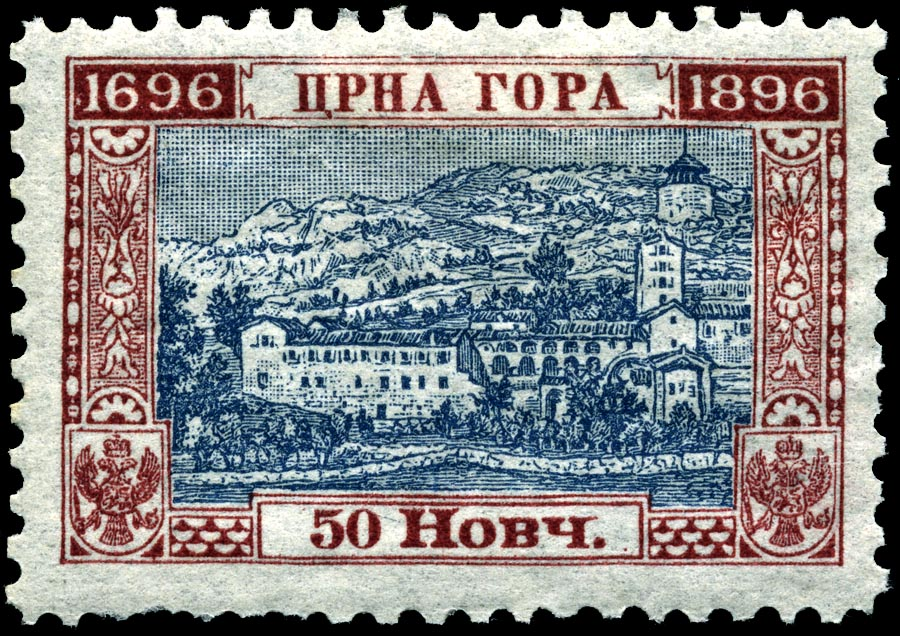
An 1896 stamp of Montenegro marking the bicentenary of the Petrović-Njegoš dynasty

== Twentieth century ==
In 1905 a new Constitution was passed in Montenegro and this resulted in existing stamps being overprinted to commemorate the event. Another change in currency in 1907 produced new stamps with another design incorporating the bust of Prince Nicholas.

On the 50th anniversary of the reign of Prince Nicholas, in 1910, he was crowned King of Montenegro and the principality was proclaimed a kingdom. This resulted in a new range of stamps being issued to commemorate this event.

In 1912 a new set of definitive stamps incorporating the bust of King Nicholas was issued.

=== Austro-Hungarian occupation ===
==== March 1917 overprint ====
Austria-Hungary occupied Montenegro in 1915. Austro-Hungarian military stamps were overprinted Montenegro and issued in 1917. Only two stamps were officially issued by Austria-Hungary during World War I on 1 March 1917: 10 heller and 15 heller Feldpostmarken with a double vertical overprint K.u.K. Milit.-Verwaltung Montenegro. The general public, however, used stamps of Austria during the occupation.

==== Non-official overprint ====
Stamps with horizontal Montenegro overprint are not official nicht verausgabte, and were printed for the first anniversary of Austrian troops occupation

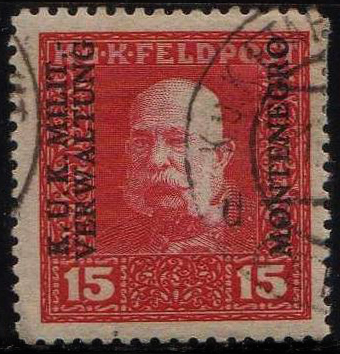
Overprinted 15-heller Austro-Hungarian military stamp

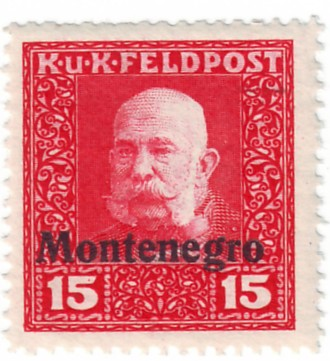
Non-issued Montenegro overprint in 1917

=== Kingdom of Serbs, Croats and Slovenes ===
On 13 November 1918 Montenegro was united with Serbia. In 1922 it became part of the Kingdom of Serbs, Croats and Slovenes. Then in 1929 this became the Kingdom of Yugoslavia.

=== WWII ===
Montenegro was occupied by Italy in 1941. The Protectorate of Montenegro was established and issued stamps until 1943. After the withdrawal of Italy from the war, the territory of Montenegro was occupied by Germany in September 1943.

==== Kotor issues ====
In April 1941, Kotor and the adjacent territories of the Montenegrin coast were annexed and incorporated into Italy as the Province of Cattaro of the Governorate of Dalmatia. After Italy surrendered to the Allies, the territory of the province of Cattaro was occupied by German troops in September 1943. Stamps were issued under the German military administration for Kotor in 1944.

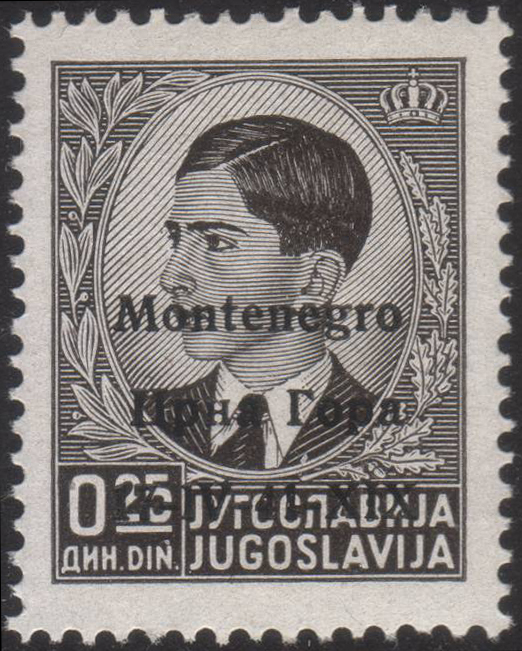
A Yugoslav stamp overprinted for Montenegro under Italian occupation

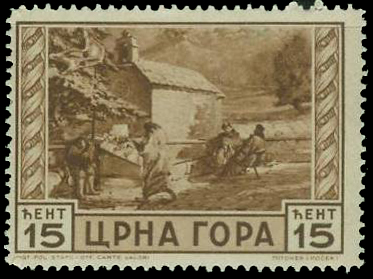
Stamp of Montenegro under Italian occupation

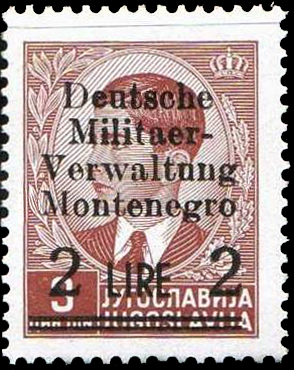
A Yugoslav stamp overprinted "Deutsche / Militär- / Verwaltung / Montenegro" ("German Military Administration of Montenegro") for Montenegro under German occupation

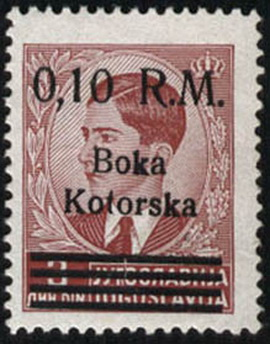
A Yugoslav stamp overprinted for Kotor under German occupation

=== Post war ===
After 1944 Montenegro became part of the federal republic of Yugoslavia and then the Union of Serbia and Montenegro in 2003.

== Modern Montenegro ==
Stamps for Montenegro again resumed issuing in 2005. Montenegro declared independence on 3 June 2006.

== Postal stationery ==
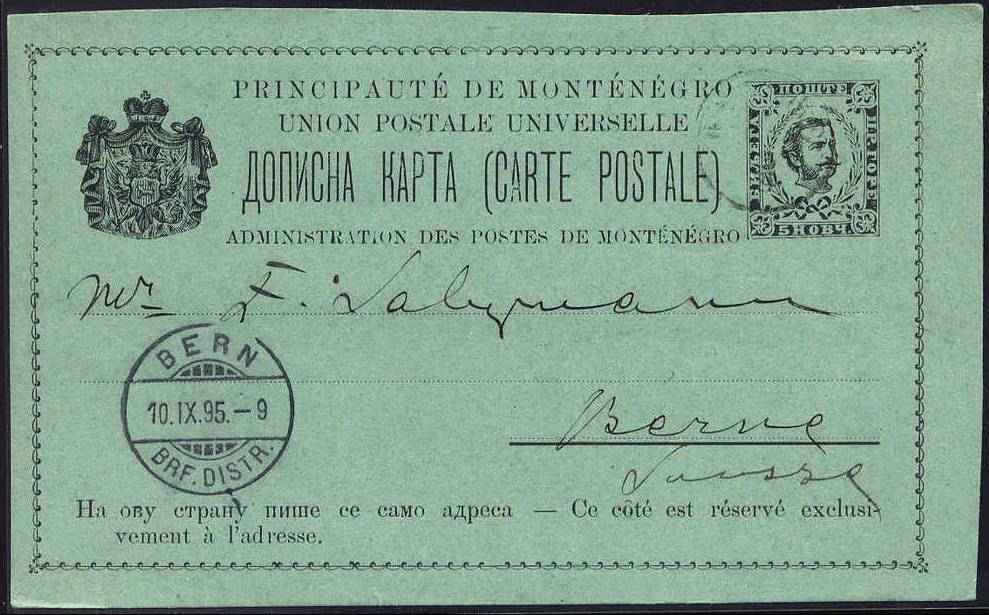
An 1895 postal card of Montenegro

The postal stationery issued by Montenegro used the same designs as those used for stamps.

Postcards were first issued in 1888, envelopes and newspaper wrappers in 1893, and lettercards in 1894. The design of all these was the bust of Prince Nicholas as first used for stamps in 1874.

In 1893, only envelopes and postcards were overprinted to commemorate the 400th anniversary of introduction of printing into Montenegro.

In 1896 all the different items of stationery were issued for 200th anniversary of Petrovich Niegush Dynasty.

The 1902 new stamp design of the bust of Prince Nicholas was also employed on all the items of postal stationery.

In 1906, envelopes, lettercards and postcards were overprinted to commemorate the granting of the constitution.

The 1907 and 1912 (in 1913) stamp designs were also used on all four items of postal stationery.
