= Postage stamps and postal history of Manchukuo =

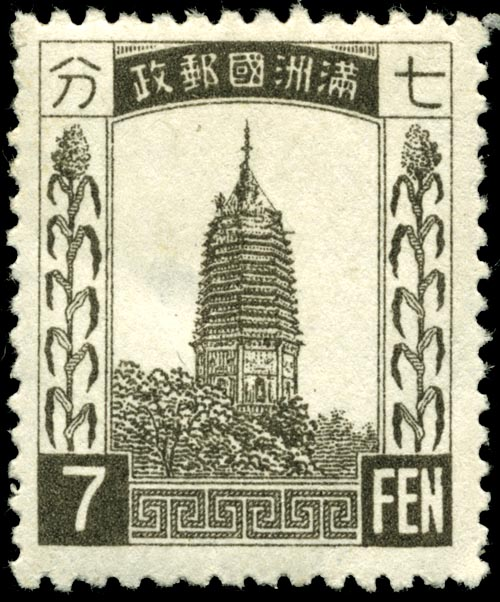
1932 Manchukuo postage stamp showing the pagoda at Liaoyang

Manchukuo (Japanese for "Manchu State") was a constitutional monarchy in Manchuria and eastern Inner Mongolia, the region being the historical homeland of the Manchus who founded the Qing dynasty of China. In 1931, it was seized by Imperial Japan following the Mukden Incident and in 1932, a puppet government was created. This was abolished in 1945 after the defeat of Imperial Japan at the end of World War II.

Manchukuo issued its first postage stamps on 26 July 1932. A number of denominations existed, with two designs: the pagoda at Liaoyang and a portrait of Puyi. Originally the inscription read (in Chinese) "Manchu State Postal Administration"; in 1934, a new issue read "Manchu Empire Postal Administration". An orchid crest design appeared in 1935, and a design featuring the "Sacred White Mountains" in 1936.

The year 1936 also saw a new regular series featuring various scenes and surmounted by the orchid crest. Between 1937 and 1945, the government issued a variety of commemoratives: for anniversaries of its own existence, to note the passing of new laws, and to honor Japan in various ways, for instance, on the 2600th Anniversary Celebrations of the Japanese Empire in 1940. The last issue of Manchukuo came on 2 May 1945, commemorating the 10th anniversary of an edict.

After the dissolution of the government, successor postal authorities locally handstamped many of the remaining stamp stocks with "Republic of China" in Chinese and so forth. In addition, the Port Arthur and Dairen Postal Administration overprinted many Manchukuo postage stamps between 1946 and 1949.

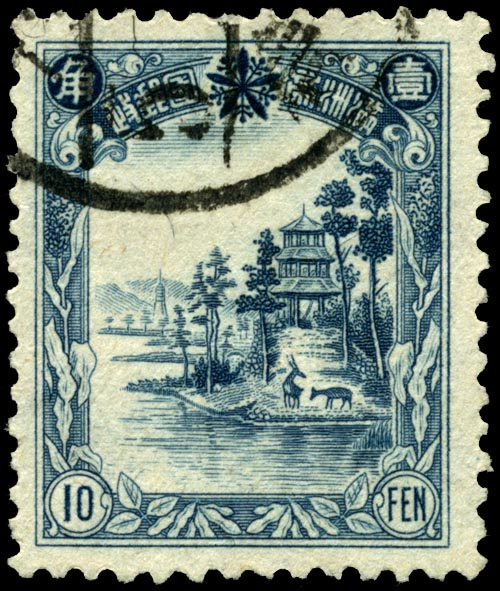
1936 Manchukuo stamp.

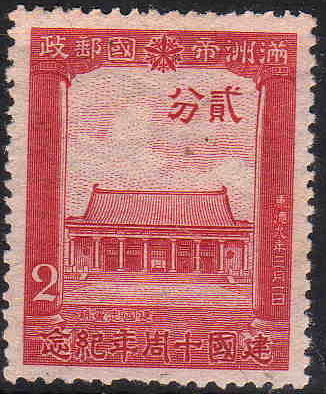
10th anniversary of Manchokuo stamp

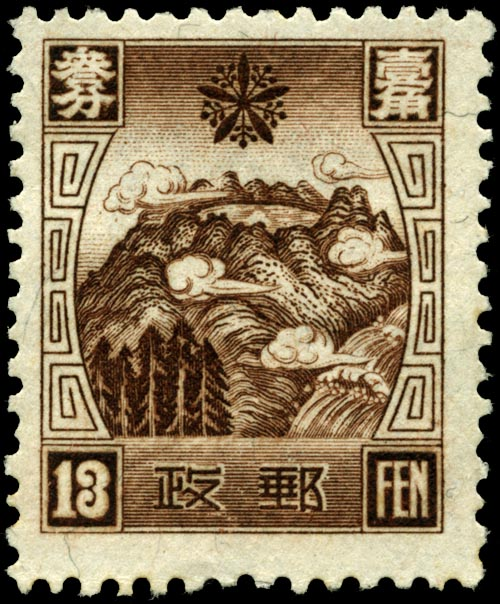
Stamp issued with no country name inscribed for use on mail to China which did not recognize Manchukuo. Its reference to the self-declared state was the Imperial Seal.

== References and sources ==
Sources

- Stanley Gibbons Ltd, various catalogues
- Stuart Rossiter & John Flower, The Stamp Atlas, W H Smith, 1989
- XLCR Stamp Finder and Collector's Dictionary, Thomas Cliffe Ltd, c.1960
- "A Guide to the stamps of Manchukuo based upon a private collection". manchukuostamps.com.
