= List of British post offices abroad =

List of post offices

Great Britain has introduced postal services throughout the world and has often made use of British definitives bearing local overprints. The following is a partial list of British postal services abroad. The list does not include agencies in South America, such as in Buenos Aires, Rio de Janeiro and Valparaiso.

== British post offices abroad ==
- British post offices in Africa various issues
- Baghdad (British Occupation) 1917 only
- Bangkok (British Post Office) 1882–1885
- Batum (British Occupation) 1919–1920
- Beirut (British Post Office) 1906 only
- British post offices in the Turkish Empire 1885–1923
- British postal agencies in Eastern Arabia 1948–1966
- Bushire (British Occupation) 1915 only
- Cameroons (British Occupation) 1915 only
- China (British Post Offices) 1917–1930
- China (British Railway Administration) 1901 only
- Crete (British Post Offices) 1898–1899
- East Africa Forces 1943–1948
- British post in Egypt (Consular Offices) 1839–1882
- British post in Egypt (British Military Occupation) 1882–1914
- Egypt (British Forces) 1932–1943
- Eritrea (British Administration) 1950–1952
- Eritrea (British Military Administration) 1948–1950
- German East Africa (British Occupation) 1917 only
- Iraq (British Occupation) 1918–1923
- Japan (British Commonwealth Occupation) 1946–1949
- Japan (British Post Offices) 1859–1879
- Mafia Island (British Occupation) 1915–1916
- Malaya (British Military Administration) 1945–1948
- Middle East Forces (MEF) 1942–1947
- Morocco Agencies 1898–1957
- North Borneo (BMA) 1945 only
- Salonika (British Field Office) 1916 only
- Sarawak (BMA) 1945 only
- Somalia (British Administration) 1950 only
- Somalia (British Military Administration) 1948–1950
- Tangier 1927–1957
- Tripolitania (British Administration) 1950–1952
- Tripolitania (British Military Administration) 1948–1950
- Uzunada, formerly Chustan Island (British Occupation) 1916 only

== See also ==
- Postage stamps and postal history of Great Britain

== Bibliography ==
- Proud, Edward B. The Postal History of the British Post Offices Abroad. Heathfield, E.Sussex: Proud-Bailey Co. Ltd., 1991 ISBN 9781872465098 551p.
- Rossiter, Stuart & Flower, John (1986). The Stamp Atlas. London: Macdonald. ISBN 0-356-10862-7.
- Stanley Gibbons Postage Stamp Catalogue – British Commonwealth. London: Stanley Gibbons Ltd, various editions.
- Wood, Hugh W. British Post Offices Abroad: Display given to the Royal Philatelic Society London, 30th April 2009. London: The Author, 2009 103p.
