= Post Office, Beirut =

Post Office is located in down town Beirut, Lebanon.

== Overview ==
In 1946, six architects and engineers teamed up to complete the design and build Beirut's existing central Post Office. Damaged during the Lebanese Civil War, the building was renovated in 1996.

== History ==
In 1899, the Ottoman Post and Telegraph Administration had its first central office in a building in Souk Al-Jamil. It was moved in 1900 to a building in the harbor area, which was later demolished to allow the enlargement of the harbor quays. Several western powers had previously developed their own national postal agencies, usually located in their consulates. France's post office was established in 1853 in the new trade center of Khan Antoun Bey, near the harbor. It was moved in 1864 to the Geday palace in Mousseitbeh. At the outbreak of World War I, all foreign post offices closed in Beirut. A French military post was however set up in 1918, followed by a postal service for civilians. Both services officially ended in 1946, when a design competition was launched for the building of what was named at the time ‘Hôtel des Postes et Télégraphes.’ Six architects and engineers were co-winners and teamed up to complete the design and build Beirut's existing central Post Office. Damaged during the Civil War (1975-1990), the building of the Post Office was renovated in 1996.

== Timeline ==
1853: France's post office was established in Khan Antoun Bey.

1864: French Post Office moved to Geday palace in Mousseitbeh.

1899: First central office for the Ottoman Post and Telegraph Administration in Souk Al-Jamil.

1900: The offices were moved to the harbor area.

1914: All foreign post offices were closed in Beirut.

1918: French military post was set up, followed by postal service for civilians.

1946: End of both services and launch of a design competition for the building of the "Hôtel des Postes et Télégraphes".

1975-1990: New building of the postal services was damaged during the Lebanese Civil War.

1996: The Post Office was renovated.

== See also ==
- Souk Al-Jamil
- Khan Antoun Bey
- Hotel des Postes et Télégraphes

== Sources ==
- Tadmori, Khaled and Agha-Kassab Sawsan (2002) Beirut during the reign of Sultan Abdul Hamid II, Municipality of Beirut and Terre du Liban Publishing, Beirut.
- Semaan, Bassil (2009) Seventy years of Postal History at the French Post Office in Beirut, in English and French, The Lebanese British Friends of the National Museum, London; Beirut.
