= Extraterritorial Office of Exchange =

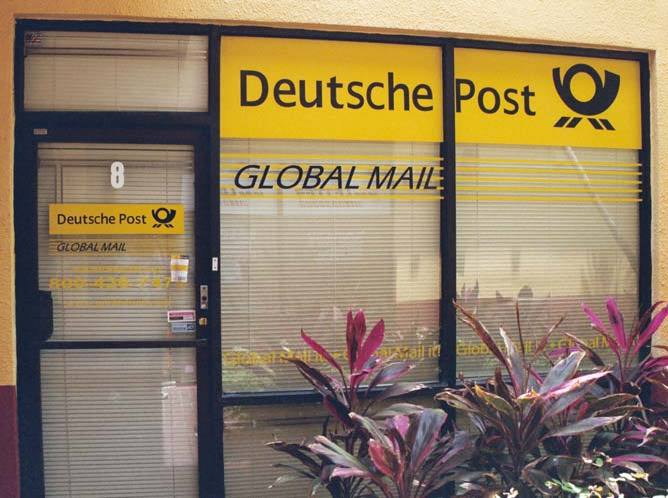
An Extraterritorial Office of Exchange operated by Deutsche Post near Miami International Airport.

An Extraterritorial Office of Exchange (ETOE) is a commercially oriented postal office or facility operated by or in connection with a postal operator in a country other than its parent country. At its 2004 Congress in Bucharest, the Universal Postal Union decided that traffic originating from ETOEs is strictly commercial which is not covered by the provisions of the UPU Convention, unless the laws or policies of the destination country allow ETOE traffic to be considered as international mail. Items exported from ETOEs operating in the United States must be accompanied by commercial customs documentation, that is, commercial airway bills; these items are not considered as international mail.
