= French post offices in Zanzibar =

Postal Office Operated in Zanzibar By French Post

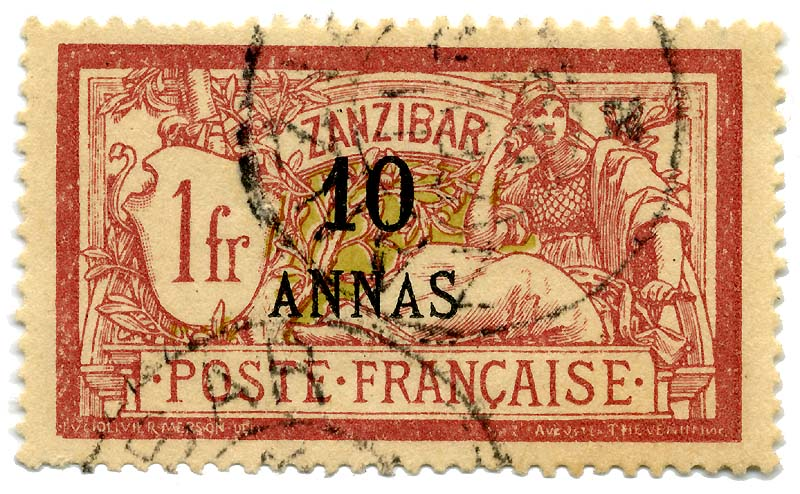
10-anna overprint on a 1-franc Type Merson, postmarked Zanzibar in 1903

The French post offices in Zanzibar were post offices operated by France in Zanzibar from January 16, 1889, to July 31, 1904, when the United Kingdom took direct control of what had previously been a protectorate.

The first issues prepared by France for use in Zanzibar were French stamps of the "Type Sage" design, overprinted with denominations expressed in annas (i.e. a sub-division of the Zanzibar rupee) across the top of the stamp. These began to appear in 1894. In 1896, France re-issued these stamps with an additional "ZANZIBAR" overprint across the bottom of the stamp. Many of the stamps of this design, especially those of 1897 created by printing on stamp margins, are very rare and expensive.

In 1902 French stamps of the "Type Blanc", "Type Mouchon", and "Type Merson" design were issued for use. These stamps incorporated the word "Zanzibar" as a part of the design, but still overprinted with denominations in annas. Stamps of this design were not regularly issued without the surcharge in annas.

== See also ==
- Postage stamps and postal history of Tanzania
- Postage stamps and postal history of Zanzibar

== Sources ==
- Stanley Gibbons Ltd: various catalogues
- AskPhil – Glossary of Stamp Collecting Terms
- Encyclopaedia of Postal History
- Rossiter, Stuart & John Flower. The Stamp Atlas. London: Macdonald, 1986. ISBN 0-356-10862-7
