= Postage stamps and postal history of Andorra =

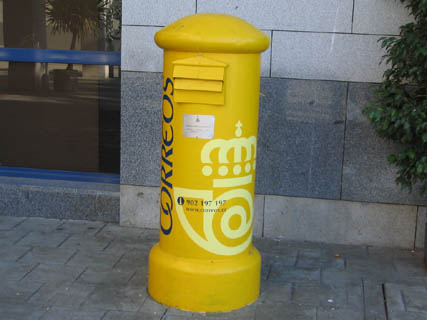
An Andorran post box

Andorra, officially the Principality of Andorra, is a small country located in the Pyrenees mountains and bordered by Spain and France. The official language is Catalan, although Spanish, French, and Portuguese are also commonly spoken.

== Overview ==
Postal services in Andorra are unique in that they are not operated by the country itself but by its two larger neighbouring countries, Spain and France. Correos of Spain and La Poste of France operate side by side.

Both postal administrations issue their own postage stamps for use in Andorra featuring unique designs, as those of Spain and France are not valid. These stamps are used only for international mail, as mail can be sent domestically within Andorra for free.

All the stamps produced by both postal services are digitised on the website of the Museu Postal D'Andorra, which closed in 2022, and now holds its collection digitally.

== French stamps ==
The 1931 issues were those of France overprinted "ANDORRE".

Its first set of stamps was produced in 1932 inscribed "Vallees d'Andorre", which depicted churches such as Our Lady's Chapel, Meritxell and St. Michael's Church, Engolasters.

There are currently [when?] a total of seven French post offices operating in Andorra.

== Spanish stamps ==
In 1928 Spanish stamps were overprinted "CORREOS ANDORRA" for use in Andorra.

The first set of Andorran themed stamps, specifically printed by Correos for the country, was issued in 1929. The stamps showed images from the Andorran valleys.

There are currently [when?] a total of eight Spanish post offices operating in Andorra.
