= Postage stamps and postal history of Dalmatia =

This is a survey of the postage stamps and postal history of Dalmatia.

== Postal history ==
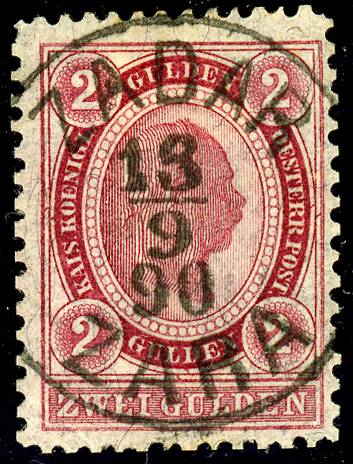
Austrian stamp used in Zadar

Before World War I, the stamps of Austria were used in Dalmatia. Some parts of Dalmatia were occupied by Italy during World War I, and used Italian stamps. In 1919 Italy printed special stamps for these Dalmatian territories. In 1920, this occupation was confirmed by the Treaty of Rapallo, including the annexation of Zadar to Italy. Following which Italian stamps were used. After the 1943 surrender of Italy to the Allies in World War II these former Italian parts of Dalmatia were occupied by German troops and Italian stamps were overprinted by German authorities for use. After troops under Marshal Tito took these areas, the stamps of Yugoslavia were used.

== Italian occupation ==
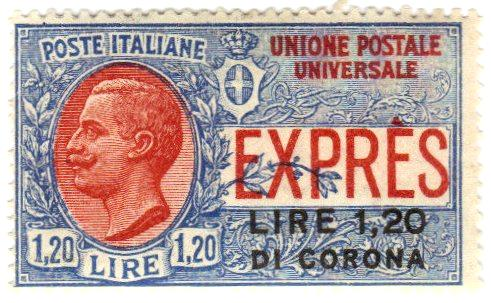
An Italian express mail stamp overprinted for use in Dalmatia, 1922

In May 1919, Italy issued special postage stamps for the part of Dalmatia it had occupied during World War I.

The stamps were produced as surcharges of Italian stamps; the first appeared 1 May 1919, and consisted of the Italian 1-lira overprinted "una / corona". 5c and 10c overprints were issued in 1921, reading "5[10] / centesimi / di corona", followed by an additional five values in 1922. Similar overprints were made for special delivery and postage due stamps.

Soon after the annexed territories switched to Italian currency and stamps. As a result, usage was uncommon and validly-used stamps are today worth about 50-100% more than unused. They are easily confused with the Italian issues used in occupied Austria; the Dalmatian overprints are distinguished by their use of a sans serif typeface.

== German occupation ==
Parts of Dalmatia were occupied by Germany in September 1943 after the withdrawal of Italy and stamps of Italy were overprinted for use in this area, centered on Zara.
