= Postage stamps and postal history of Morocco =

A 1979 stamp of Morocco

The postal history of Morocco is complex due to the country's political development in the 20th century. Mail was sent via post offices operated by the Sherifian post created by the Sultan, and by the European powers. After Morocco was partitioned into protectorates of France and of Spain in 1912, both European administrations established postal services in their respective zones.

== Early stamps ==
The first Moroccan postal stamps were produced in 1891 by private companies which managed courier services between cities.

The system was replaced after a reorganization in 1911, the Sherifian post was created to handle local mail, and produced two series of stamps which were valid for use until 1915 and until 1919 in Tangier.

== Sherifian post ==
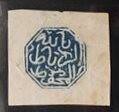
Old Moroccan stamp of the 19th century. The letters of private individuals were obliterated by an octagonal seal and the official courier by a round seal. Each city had a specific stamp.

In 1881, upon learning that foreigners were preparing to set up a local post office between Mazagan (El Jadida) and Marrakesh, Sultan Moulay Hassan I ordered the port officials to organize the Moroccan post office. On 22 November 1892 the first structure of mail transport was created in Morocco by Dahir Sultan. The text of the Royal Decree laid down the rules of organization and operation of the postal administration. Postal links were subsequently created by individuals to provide postal service between the various cities. The local postmen were called the "Rakkas". The stamps used bore the names of the cities of dispatch and destination:

El Jadida / Marrakesh (1891) Tangier / Fez (1892) Essaouira / Marrakesh (1892) Fez / Sefrou (1894) Tangier / Assilah (1895) Tétouan / Chaouen (1896) Tangier / Tétouan (1896) Ksar Elkbir / Ouazzen (1896) Tétouan / Ksar Elkbir (1897) Fez / Meknes (1897) Tangier / Ksar Elkbir (1898) Tangier / Larache (1898) Safi / Marrakesh (1898) Essaouira / Agadir (1900) Demnat / Marrakesh (1906)

The Makhzen Post first used negative Arabic inscriptions, called "Makhzen stamps", bearing the name of the office and a call for the protection of God. The letters of private individuals were obliterated by an octagonal seal and the official courier by a round seal. Each city had a specific stamp.

In 1911, the "Moroccan Telegraph Company" was given the task of organizing the national post office and establishing postage stamps instead of stamps. The new postal service was inspired by a European model and started its activity on 1 March 1912 under the name of the Cherifian Administration of Telegraph and Telephone Posts. She issued her first stamp on 22 May 1912.

An agreement signed on 1 October 1913 between Morocco and France led to the creation by Dahir of the Office Chérifien des Postes des Telegraphes et Telephones.

=== List of private courier transmission lines ===
- Demnate – Marrakesh
- Ksar-el-Kebir – Ouezzane
- Fez – Meknes
- Fez – Sefrou
- Mazagan – Azemmour – Marrakesh
- Mazagan – Marrakesh
- Mogador – Agadir
- Mogador – Marrakesh
- Safi – Marrakesh
- Tangier – Asilah
- Tangier – Ksar-el-Kebir
- Tangier – Fez
- Tangier – Larache
- Tangier – Tétouan
- Tétouan – Chefchaouen
- Tétouan – Ksar-el-Kebir

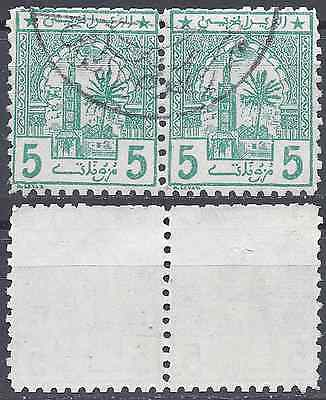
A Moroccan stamp, dating to the early 20th century. The inscription in Arabic mentions the price of the stamp, 5 mouzouna, which is a subdivision of the Hassani Rial, the local Moroccan currency used in the 19th and early 20th century.

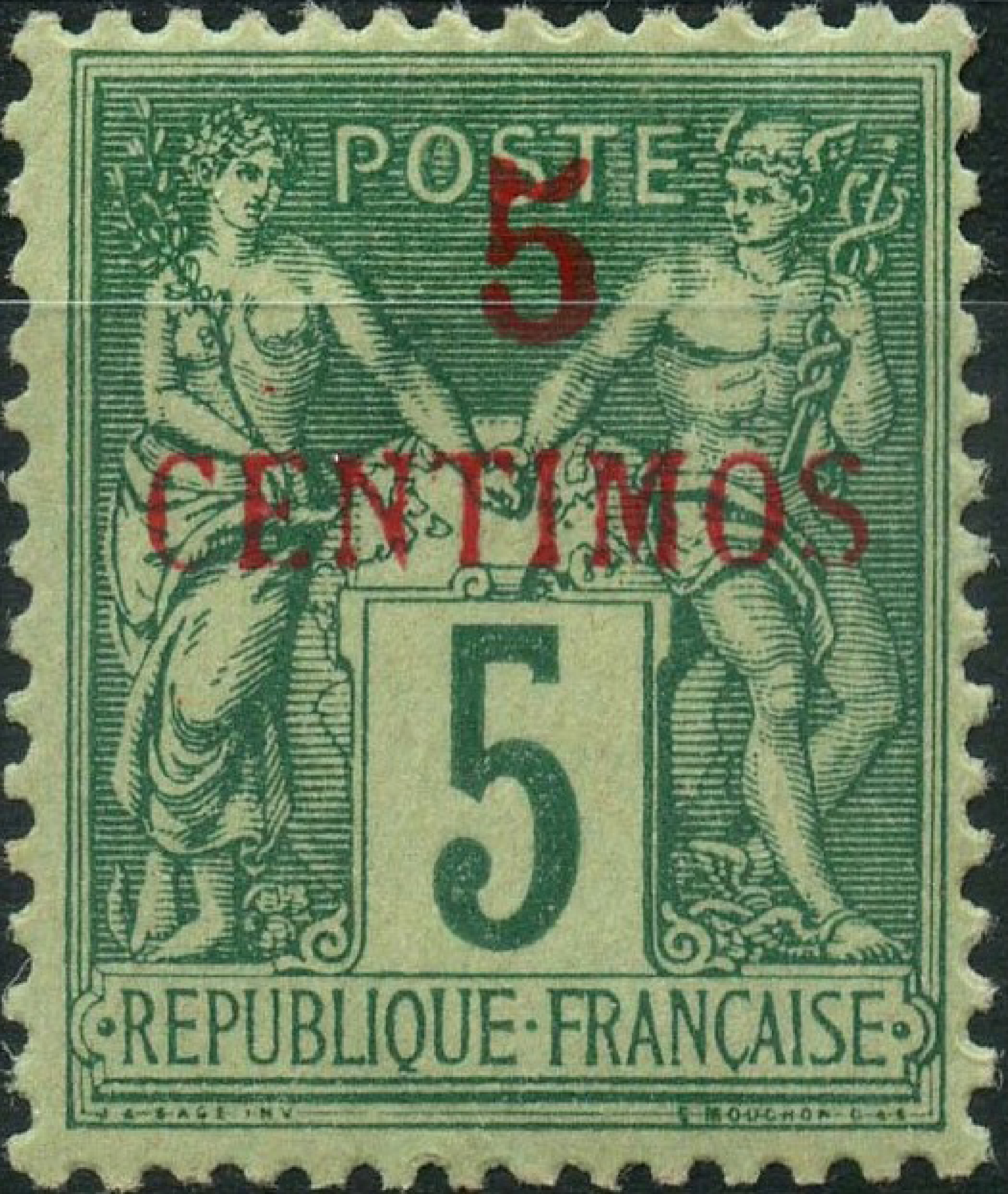
A French stamp surcharged for the French Post Office in Morocco, 1891

== Foreign post offices in Morocco ==
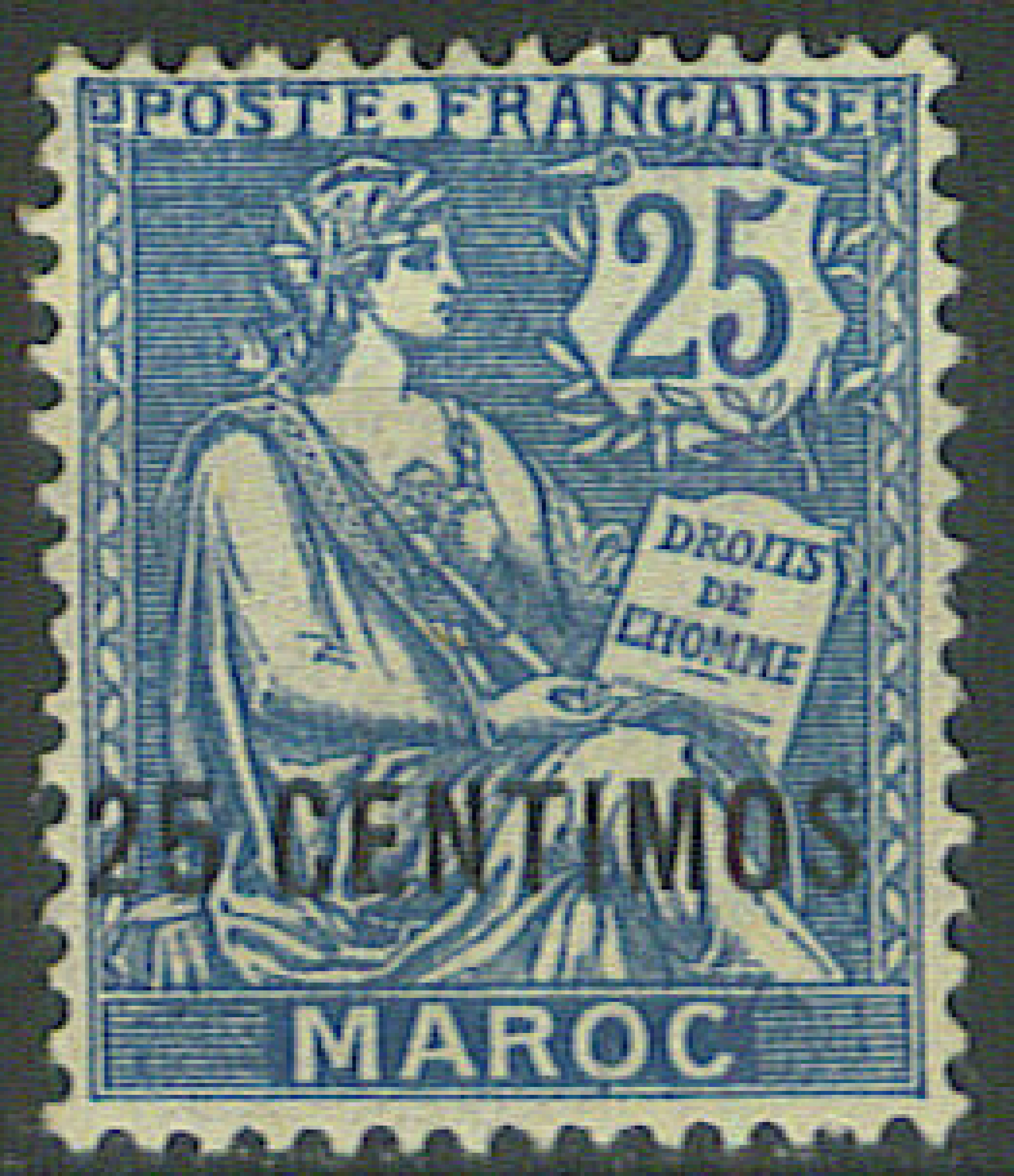
1902 stamp for the French Post Office in Morocco

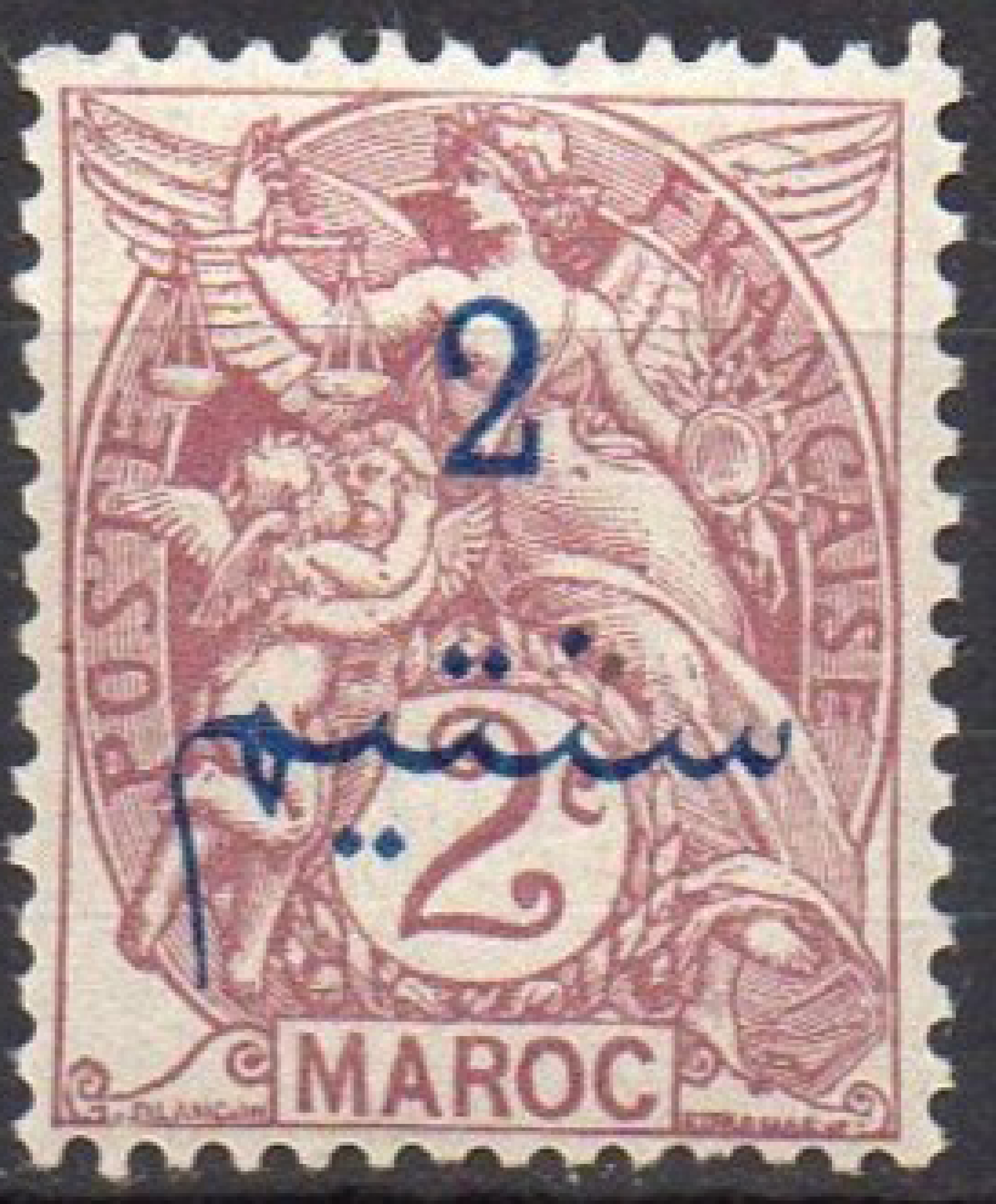
1911 stamp for the French Post Office in Morocco overprinted in Arabic

=== French post offices in Morocco ===
A French postal agency had sent mail from Tangier as early as 1854, but the formal beginning of the system was in 1891, when French post offices were established throughout the sultanate. The offices issued postage stamps of France surcharged with values in pesetas and centimos, at a 1–1 ratio with the denominations in French currency, using both the Type Sage issues, and after 1902, Mouflon issues inscribed "MAROC" (which were never officially issued without the surcharge). In 1911, the Mouflon issues were overprinted in Arabic.

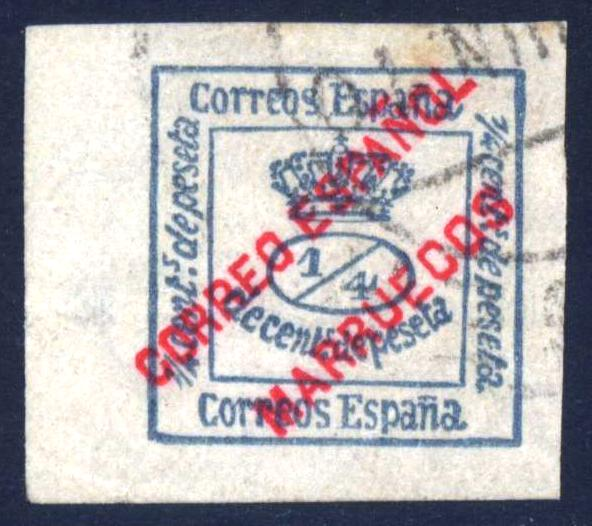
Postage stamp for the Spanish Post Office in Morocco, issued 1903

=== Spanish post offices in Morocco ===
The first Spanish post office in Morocco opened in 1867 and issued stamps in 1903.

== Morocco under European rule ==
=== French protectorate ===
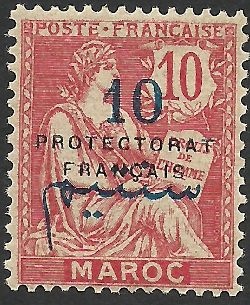
Stamp overprinted "PROTECTORAT FRANCAIS" in 1914

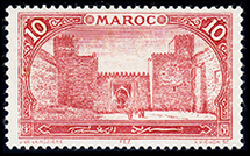
A 1917 stamp of the French protectorate of Morocco

The first stamps of the protectorate appeared 1 August 1914, and were just the existing stamps with the additional overprint reading "PROTECTORAT FRANCAIS". The first new designs were in an issue of 1917, consisting of 17 stamps in six designs, denominated in centimes and francs, and inscribed "MAROC" in French and Arabic.

=== Spanish protectorate ===
After the Spanish protectorate was established, Spanish stamps overprinted "Marruecos" were issued in 1914, followed by stamps overprinted "Protectorado Español en Marruecos" in 1915. A set of definitives inscribed "Zona Protectorado Español en Marruecos" were issued in 1928, with later issues marked "Marruecos/Protectorado Español".

The first stamps for the southern zone called Cape Juby were issued in 1916, overprinting "CABO JUBI" on stamps of Río de Oro. Later issues were overprinted on stamps of Spain from 1919 to 1929, and then on stamps of Spanish Morocco. From 1950, Cape Juby used stamps of Spanish Sahara.

=== Tangier ===
Tangier, as an international zone, had French post offices which used the stamps of French Morocco overprinted with the name of the city. Spain also maintained post offices in Tangier which had stamps issued specifically for them. The British post offices in Tangier issued its own stamps in 1927. German post offices in Tangier opened until 1919.

== Ifni ==
Spain began issuing postage stamps for Ifni, then a Spanish territory, in 1941, initially overprinting Spanish stamps with "TERRITORIO DE IFNI", then issuing new designs in 1943. Issues followed at the rate of about ten per year with the last on 23 November 1968. Most are commonly available and are more often seen unused than used.

== After independence ==
In 1955, the kingdom of Morocco regained independence and postal autonomy. Tangier was reintegrated into the Moroccan state.

From 1956 to 1957, stamps were issued in francs and Spanish pesetas for the southern zone and northern zone, respectively. The franc was used throughout Morocco from 1958 and the first stamps for the entire country were the issue for the World Fair in Brussels.

After the Ifni War in 1958, Cape Juby was re-incorporated into the Moroccan state. The Moroccan postal service was extended in 1969 to the former Spanish Ifni and 1975 to the northern half of Western Sahara. Since 1979, the Moroccan Post has operated in the entire Western Sahara within the Moroccan Walls.

== Stamps marked Western Sahara ==
Stamps marked República Saharaui (Saharan Republic), Sahara Occidental (Western Sahara) or Sahara Occ. R.A.S.D. relate to the disputed region of Western Sahara occupied by Morocco. The Moroccan post office, in a Universal Postal Union circular, has stated that they do not regard these stamps as legitimate. However, the Moroccan post office have themselves issued stamps celebrating Moroccan sovereignty over the region.

== See also ==
- List of postal codes in Morocco
- British post offices in Morocco
- German post offices in Morocco

== References and sources ==
Sources

- Stanley Gibbons Ltd, Europe and Colonies 1970, Stanley Gibbons Ltd, 1969
- Rossiter, Stuart & John Flower. The Stamp Atlas. London: Macdonald, 1986. ISBN 0-356-10862-7
- XLCR Stamp Finder and Collector's Dictionary, Thomas Cliffe Ltd, c.1960
