= French post offices in China =

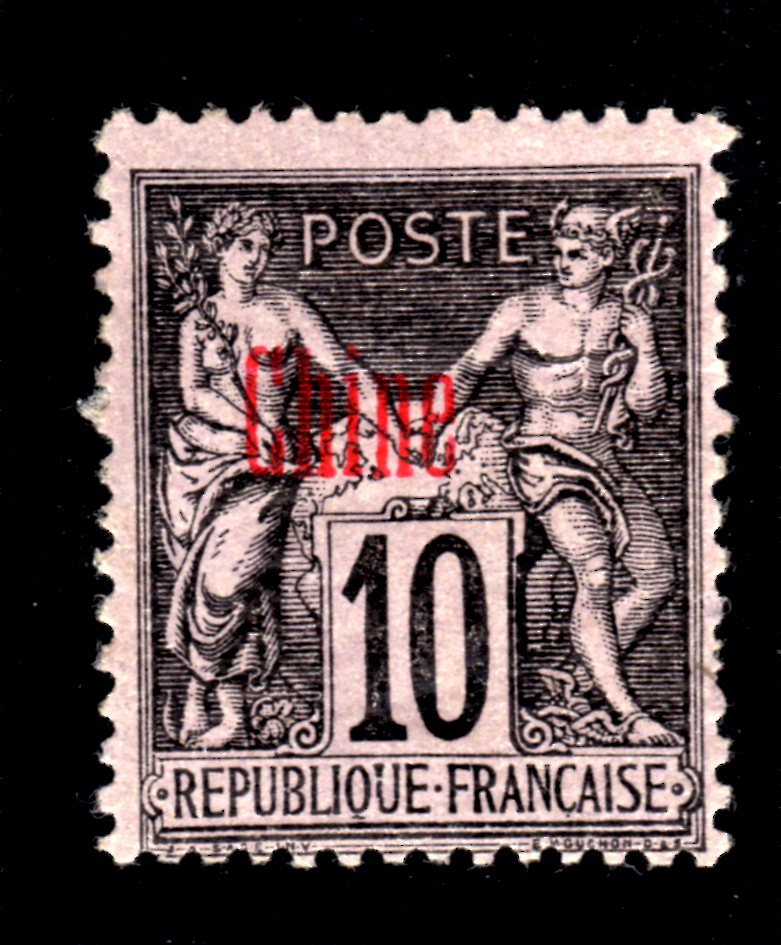
French stamp overprinted for use in China, 1894

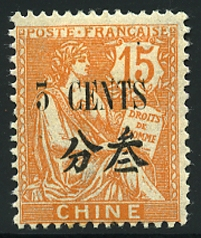
French stamp overprinted with Chinese currency face value in French and Chinese

The French post offices in China were among the post offices maintained by foreign powers in China from the mid-19th century until 1922. In 1862, the first civilian French post office in China was opened in Shanghai. Initially, the French government used ordinary French postage stamps (e.g. Napoleon III, Laureated Empire, Ceres, Sage) issues for these offices. These forerunner stamps can be shown to have been sold or used in China only by a postmark. For example, stamps used in Shanghai prior to 1894 can only be identified by diamond-shaped cancel made of a type referred to (in French) as a "losange à gros chiffres" with the numbers "5104" in the center of the cancel or a Shanghai c.d.s. There are actually two types of "5104" obliterators differ by the shape of the "4", one straight and the other curved.

== Operation ==
Unlike other foreign post offices in China, the French operated two distinct types of post offices in China. Offices of the first type, typically located in French concessions and mostly in northern China, were run directly by the French Ministry of Foreign Affairs. The offices of the second type, also referred to as the "Indochinese Offices" were located in southern China and operated under the direction of the postal administration of the nearby colony of French Indochina.

=== Run by France ===
The Paris-run Post Offices in China and their opening dates are as follows:

1862

- Shanghai (spelled as "Shang-haï" in the French postmark of the period)

1889

- Tianjin (Tien-tsin)

1898

- Hankou (Han-kéou)
- Zhifu (Tché-fou)

1900

- Arsenal Pagoda
- Beijing (Pékin)
- Fuzhou (Fou-Tchéou)
- Ningbo (Ning-po)

1902

- Xiamen (Amoy)

For the above post offices, the French government issued stamps of the "Peace and Commerce" series overprinted with the word "CHINE" beginning in 1894. Stamp issues of the 20th century initially included overprints applied to some of the stamps issued for use in French Indochina, and continued with stamps printed specifically for use in China. Some earlier 20th century stamps were issued only with face values expressed in French francs, but all later issues were overprinted with the equivalent of the stamp's Chinese currency face value expressed in both French and Chinese.

In addition to ordinary postage stamps, France also issued postal stationery and postage due stamps for use at the Paris-run Chinese post offices.

=== Run by French Indochina ===
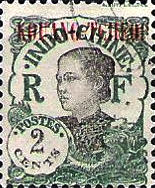
French Indochina stamp overprinted for use in Kouang-Tchéou-Wan

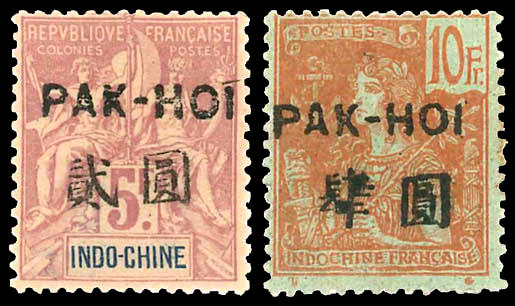
Two stamps of the French colony of Indochine overprinted for use in Pak-Hoi (Beihai)

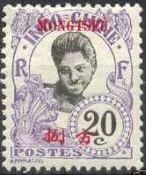
French Indochina stamp overprinted for use in Mongtseu

The post offices run by French Indochina differed from the other French Post Offices in China in a number of areas. Initially, the general issues of the Paris-run French Offices in China (c. 1902–1904) were used, and these can be found with postmarks applied by the Indochinese offices. Shortly thereafter, stamps were issued with overprints specific to the office that issued them. For instance, the Canton office issued stamps overprinted "CANTON" rather than "CHINE". Seven such Indochinese post offices had these overprints (here written as they appeared on the stamps) along with their opening dates:

1900

- Hoi Hao
- Kouang Tchéou Wan
- Yunnan Fou

1901

- Canton

1902

- Pakhoi
- Mongtze

1903

- Tchongking

One additional way that the Indochinese offices differed from the other French Post Offices in China was that their issues were all overprints applied to the then-current stamps of French Indochina, rather than to the stamps of France. The Paris-run offices would not accept mail franked with unoverprinted stamps of French Indochina, but the Indochinese run-offices are known to have done so. For this reason, French Indochina stamps are sometimes found legitimately used with cancels from one of their Chinese offices. Stamps from the Indochinese offices in China can likewise be found with cancels from Indochina proper, although these were likely applied at Hanoi or other locations through which mail had to pass, (i.e. these are essentially paquebot cancels). From 1923, remainder stocks of the Indochinese office issues were used up in Indochina and Kouang-Tchéou-Wan, see below.

The Indochinese Offices in France also sometimes opened sub-post offices within the area they served. For instance, the Canton office would eventually open six branches within the area it served. The specific branch a Canton stamp was used at can sometimes be seen in the postmark. Earlier Canton postmarks read "Canton / Chine" whereas later cancels include a code letter from A to F to show at which branch of the Canton office they were used. Although covers are uncommon to scarce with some index letters (code letter C being most common), on adhesives these cancels are quite common on the overprinted Indochina issues. Recently it has been suggested that these code letters could be time code instead of name of branch offices. Time coding was used by the British post office in Canton on its cancels at around this time. Code A was used in the morning shift and code B in the afternoon shift.

== Closure ==
All foreign-run post offices in China permanently closed on 31 December 1922, if they had not been closed earlier. - The remainder stocks of the Indochinese office issues were called back by the French Indochina postal authorities and used up in Indochina and Kouang Tchéou Wan. They are seen on commercially used covers, also used in mixed frank with regular issues, until the mid-1930s. Particular the stocks of high denomination stamps took a long time to be exhausted.

== Guangzhouwan ==
One notable exception to this were the post offices in Kouang-Tchéou-Wan, which was a territory leased by treaty to France for a 99-year period starting in 1898. This arrangement is comparable to that of the New Territories in Hong Kong.

As it remained a leased territory even after 1922, Kouang-Tchéou-Wan was the only French postal entity in China to issue airmail stamps and semi-postal stamps, though most of these were issued by the government of Vichy France. Due to war-time conditions and the fact that the colonial authorities in Kouang-Tchéou-Wan did not recognize the Vichy government, Vichy-issued stamps for Kouang Tchéou Wan were never placed in use there.

French postal operations in Kouang-Tchéou-Wan continued until 1943, when the colony was occupied by the Japanese army. Although France resumed sovereignty briefly over the colony for a few months at the end of the Second World War, the territory was returned to China in early 1946.

== Sources ==
- Stanley Gibbons Ltd: various catalogues
- Yvert et Tellier: various catalogues
- AskPhil – Glossary of Stamp Collecting Terms
- Encyclopaedia of Postal History
- Stuart Rossiter & John Flower: The Stamp Atlas
- The Hong Kong Philately Society Journal J23, J25, J26, J27, J28 Postal History and Philately articles by Dr. Andrew Cheung FRPSL, AIEP and Mr. Dennis Chow on French Post Offices in China
