= Postage stamps and postal history of Lithuania =

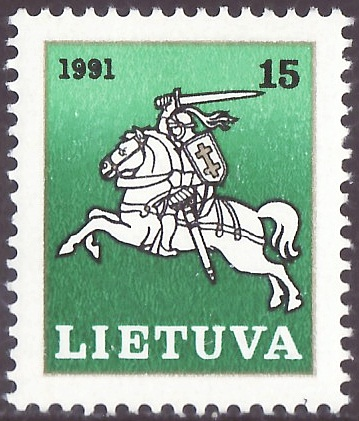
A 1991 stamp of Lithuania depicting Vytis, an armour-clad knight on horseback holding a sword and shield

This is a survey of the postage stamps and postal history of Lithuania.

== Early postal history ==
The postal history of Lithuania started around the 10th or 12th century or even earlier, with a pre-Christian messaging system known as krivūlė. The first mail service was introduced in 1562, connecting Vilnius with Kraków, and Venice.

== German occupation, 1916–1919 ==
Lithuania was under the rule of the Russian Empire until the 20th century. After the outbreak of World War I, Germany occupied Lithuania and Courland in 1915. The civil administration of the Oberbefehlhaber Ost was created in the German-occupied territory of the Russian Empire. Stamps of Germany overprinted "Postgebiet Ob. Ost" were issued in 1916.

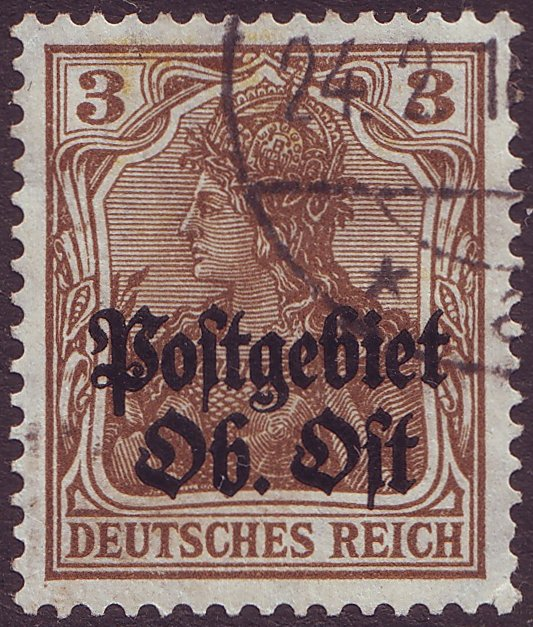
Stamp issued for use in Ober Ost during WWI, overprinted on German stamp, 1916

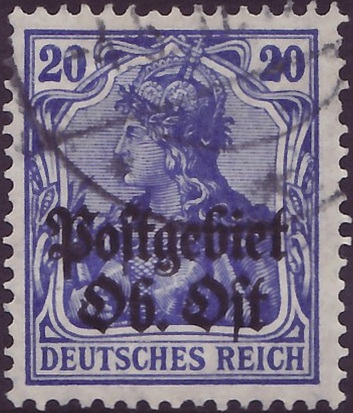
Stamp issued for use in Ober Ost during WWI, overprinted on German stamp, 1916

== First stamps of the Republic ==
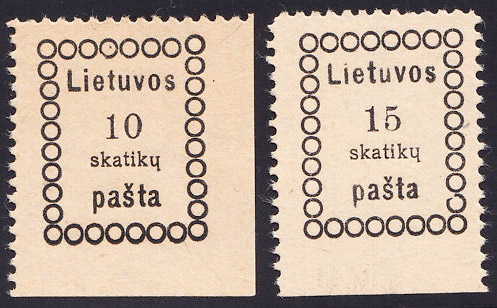
The First stamps of Lithuania - First Vilnius Issue (date of issue: December 27, 1918; Michel cat. No. 1-2)

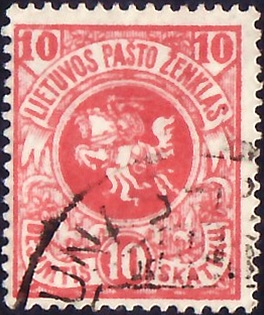
A 1919 stamp of Lithuania

The Act of Independence of Lithuania was adopted on 16 February 1918, proclaiming Lithuania as an independent republic. The first Lithuanian postage stamps ("Baltukai" issue) were issued in Vilnius in 1918. A total of 768 stamps of different designs were issued by the Republic of Lithuania between 1918 and 1940, with more than 2,000 variations due to errors, misprints or perforations. The first airmail stamps were issued in 1921.

== Soviet occupation, 1940–1941 ==
After the 1940 occupation by the Soviet Union, Lithuanian postage stamps were overprinted "LTSR" (Lietuvos Tarybų Socialistinė Respublika, Lithuanian for Lithuanian Socialist Soviet Republic). These were then replaced by Soviet stamps.

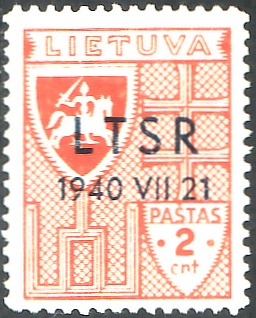
Lithuanian stamp overprinted "LTSR", 1940

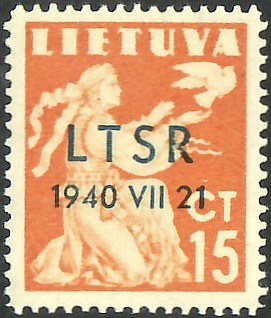
Lithuanian stamp overprinted "LTSR", 1940

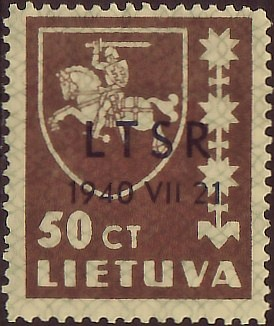
Lithuanian stamp overprinted "LTSR", 1940

== German occupation, 1941–1945 ==
On June 22, 1941, Nazi Germany invaded the Soviet Union. Following the German occupation, Soviet stamps were overprinted "Nepriklausoma Lietuva 1941-VI-23" (Independent Lithuania 1941-VI-23) in 1941. Lithuania became part of the Reichskommissariat Ostland, the German occupation administration. Stamps were issued for use in the Reichskommissariat Ostland by overprinting "Ostland" on stamps of Germany.

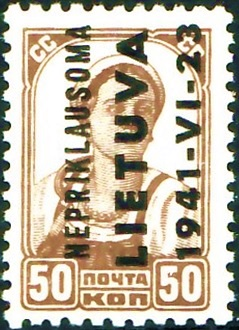
Soviet stamp overprinted "NEPRIKLAUSOMA LIETUVA 1941-VI-23"

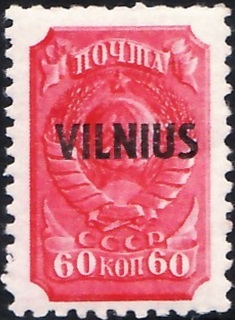
Soviet stamp overprinted "VILNIUS", local issue for the Vilnius region, 1941

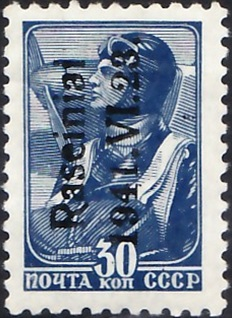
Soviet stamp overprinted "Raseiniai 1941.VI.23", local issue for Raseiniai, 1941

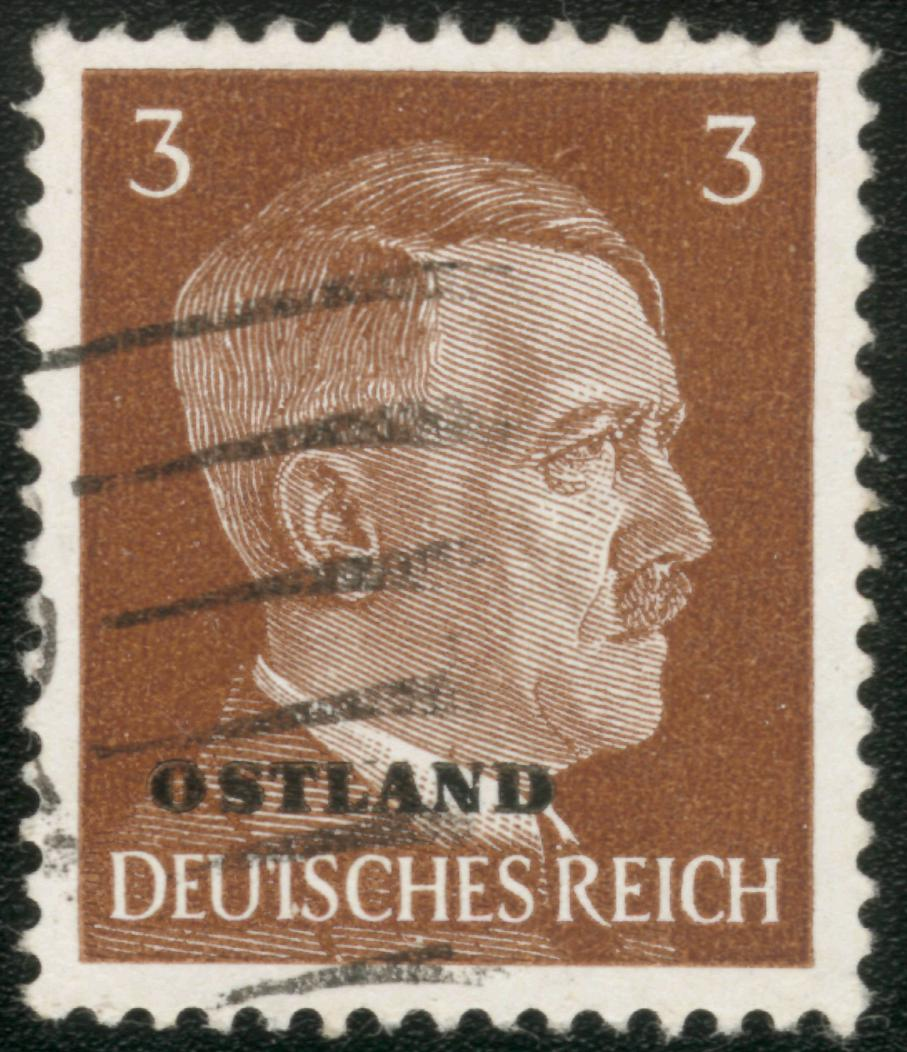
Stamp for the Reichskommissariat Ostland, 1941

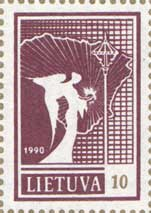
The 1990 issue of Lithuania featuring an angel and the map of Lithuania

== Soviet era ==
After the war, the Soviet Union reestablished occupation over Lithuania and Soviet stamps came into use again.

== Restoration of independence ==
After Lithuania declared the restoration of independence on 11 March 1990, Lithuania again issued own stamps. Lithuania's independence was recognized by the Soviet Union on September 6, 1991.

== Local issues ==
There were also several local issues, including the Raseiniai local issue (1919), Telšiai Postmaster's provisional issue (1920), Grodno issue (1919), and others.

=== Central Lithuania ===
In the course of the Polish–Soviet War, pro-Polish separatists proclaimed the creation of the Republic of Central Lithuania (Litwa Środkowa) centered around Vilnius in October 1920. Central Lithuania issued stamps from 1920 until annexation by Poland in 1922.

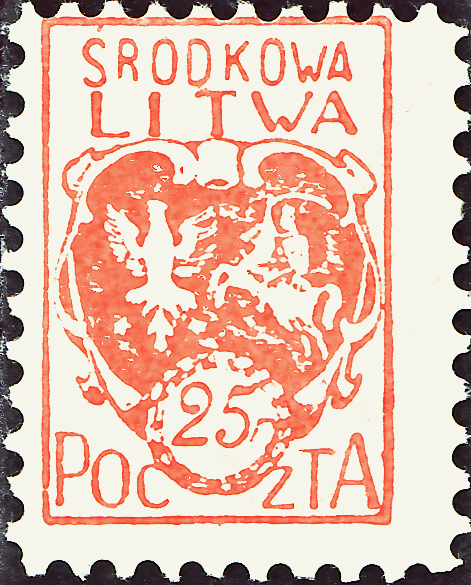
Stamp of Central Lithuania, 1920

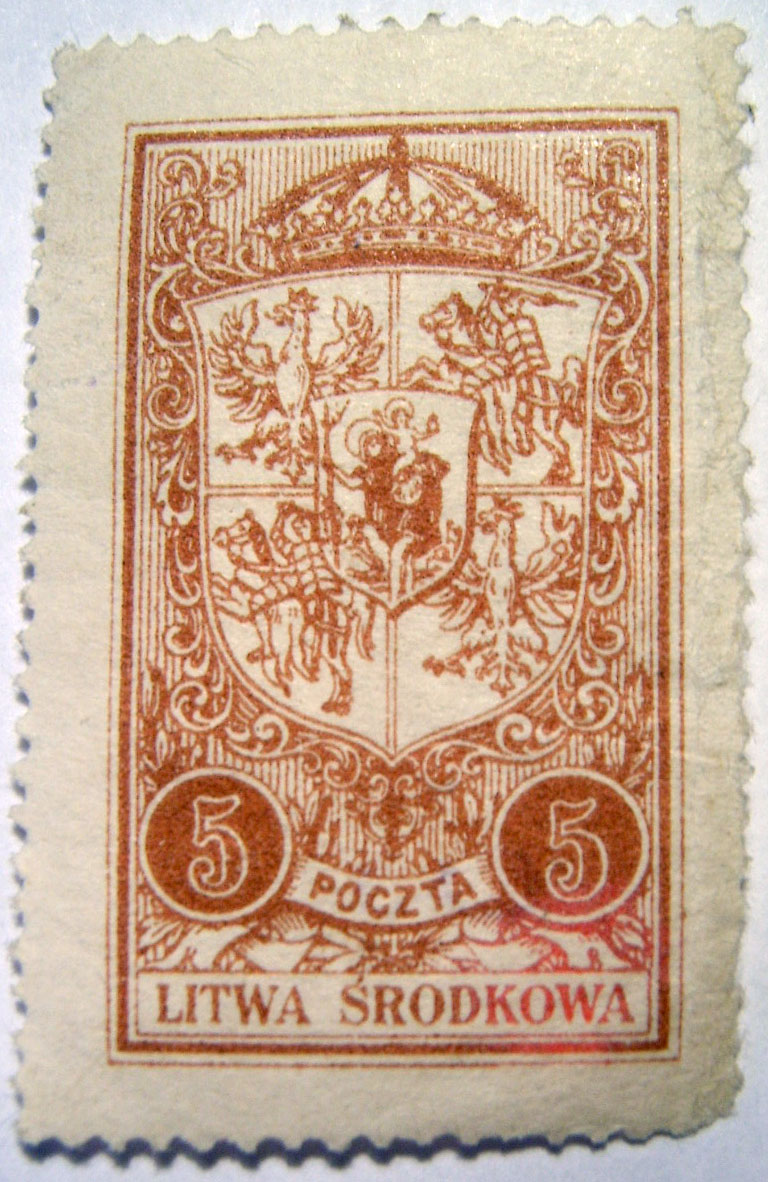
Stamp of Central Lithuania, 1920

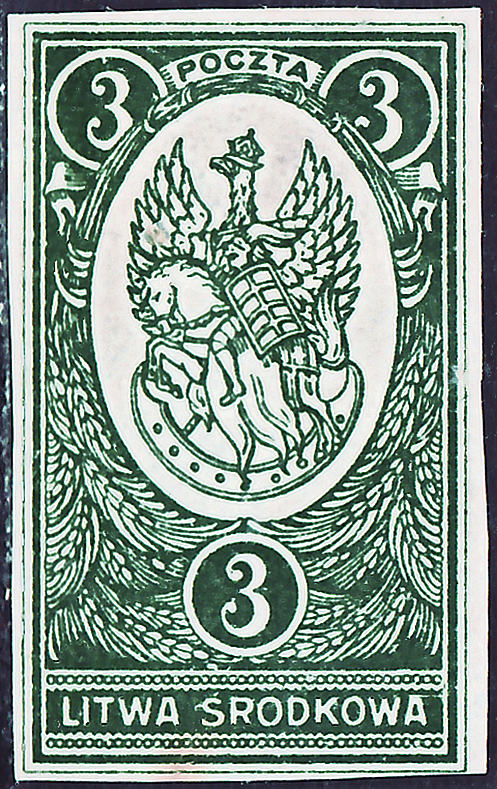
Stamp of Central Lithuania, 1921

=== Memel ===
In 1920, according to the Treaty of Versailles, the German area north of the Memel river was given the status of Territoire de Memel under the administration of the Council of Ambassadors, and French troops were sent for protection.

On 9 January 1923, Lithuania occupied the territory during the Klaipėda Revolt and the territory was annexed by Lithuania.

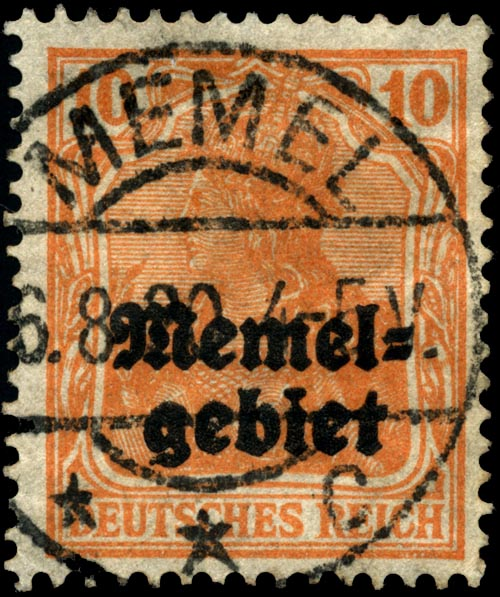
German stamp overprinted "Memelgebiet" by the French administration, 1920

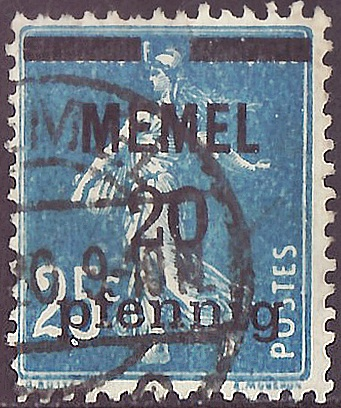
French stamp overprinted "MEMEL" and surcharged, 1920

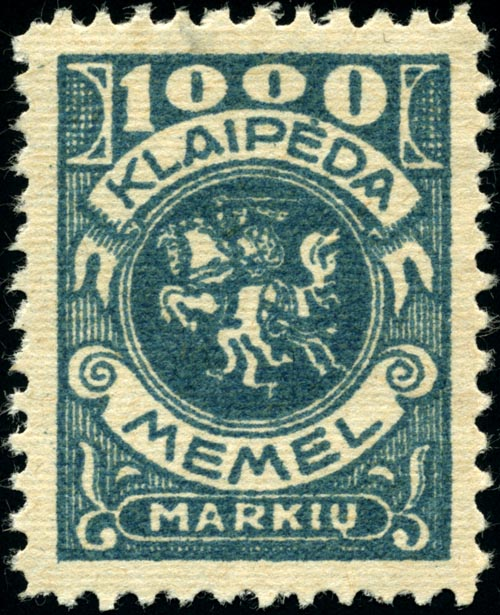
Stamp issued by Lithuania for Memel (Klaipėda), 1923

== Sources ==
- Postage Stamp of Lithuania (1979, New York) ISBN 0-912574-33-X
- Lietuvos pasto zenklai: Pasto zenklu katalogas ISBN 5-417-00448-0
