= French post offices in Egypt =

Postal Office Operated in Egypt By French Post

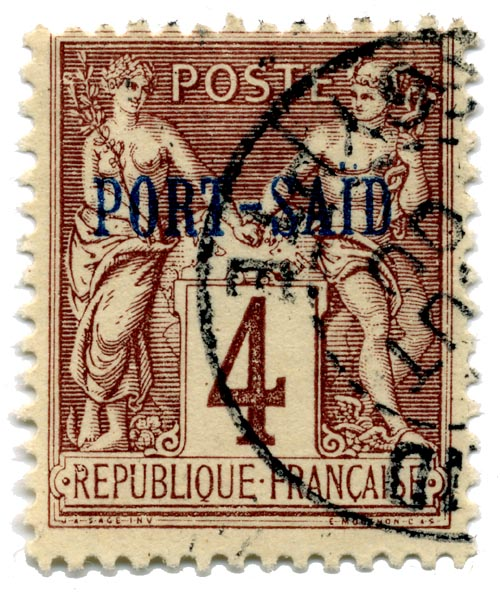
1899 Port Said overprint on 4-centime, used in 1900

The French post offices in Egypt were a system of post offices maintained by France in Egypt during the 19th century and the early years of the 20th century. They were primarily intended to facilitate commercial and trading interests that needed to communicate between France and points east.

The post offices were located at Alexandria, Cairo, Suez and Port Said.

Initially, in the pre-stamp period, letters were sent with appropriate postal markings to indicate payment and non-payment (letters traveling "bearing" in philatelic terms). In 1857, the regular postage stamps of France were distributed for use at the French Consular Post Offices in Egypt. Although letters could still be sent without postage affixed, in practice most letters were sent franked with stamps paying the required rate. The use of the generally issued stamps of France stopped in 1898 and in 1899, stamps were officially overprinted for the post offices at Alexandria and Port Said (the post offices at Suez and Cairo closed prior to this change). France issued postage stamps for each of the two remaining post offices, generally at the same time and with the same general characteristics, with the one overprinted or inscribed "ALEXANDRIE" and the other "PORT-SAID".

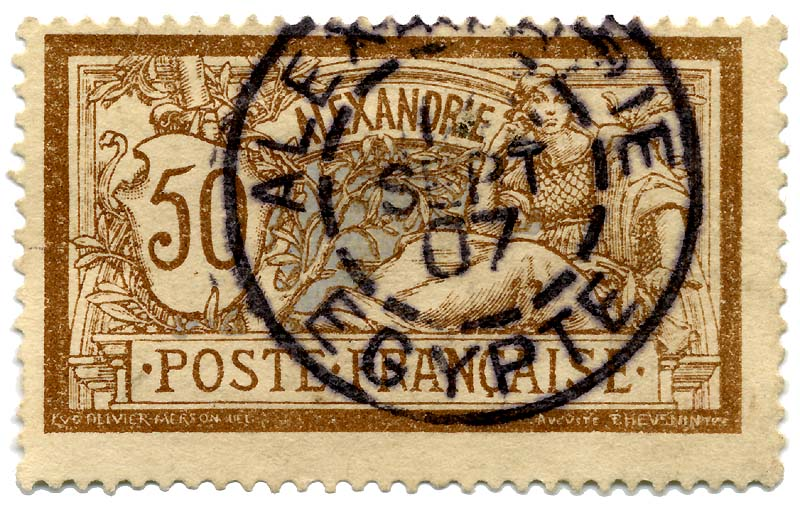
50-centime Type Merson design for Alexandria, issued 1902, this one used in the city in 1907

The first issue appeared in 1899; it consisted of the post office name (as described above) overprinted on the current "Type Sage" stamps, a total of 15 values ranging from one centime to five francs. A shortage of the 25c values at Port Said necessitated surcharges on the 10c value, reading "PORT SAID / VINGT / CINQ". A few of these were additional overprinted with "25" in red ink.

The first stamps inscribed for these post offices were the French designs of 1900 modified to include the post offices' names. The 15 values appeared in 1902 and 1903.

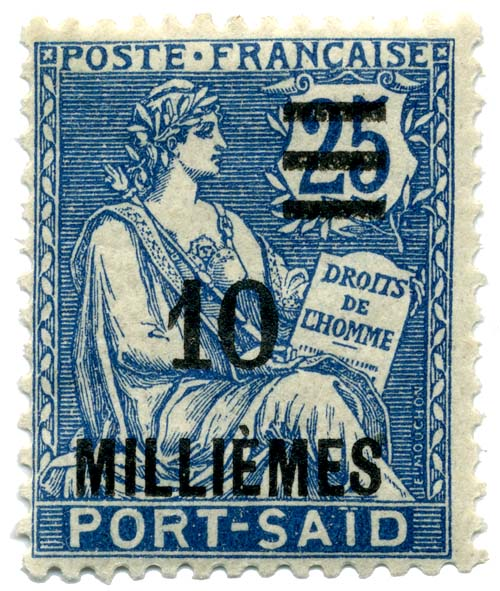
10-millieme overprint with bars obscuring the 25-centime value for Port Said, 1925

In 1921 the stamps were surcharged in Egyptian currency, at the rate of about 2.5 centimes per millieme. Several forms of the surcharge exist. In Alexandria, local surcharges read "4 Mill." etc., while in Port Said they read "4 / Milliemes", with the number in a sans-serif typeface. Soon after Paris-produced surcharges arrived in both offices; they read "4 / MILLIEMES" etc. A new round of surcharges in 1925 added black bars to obscure the French currency values.

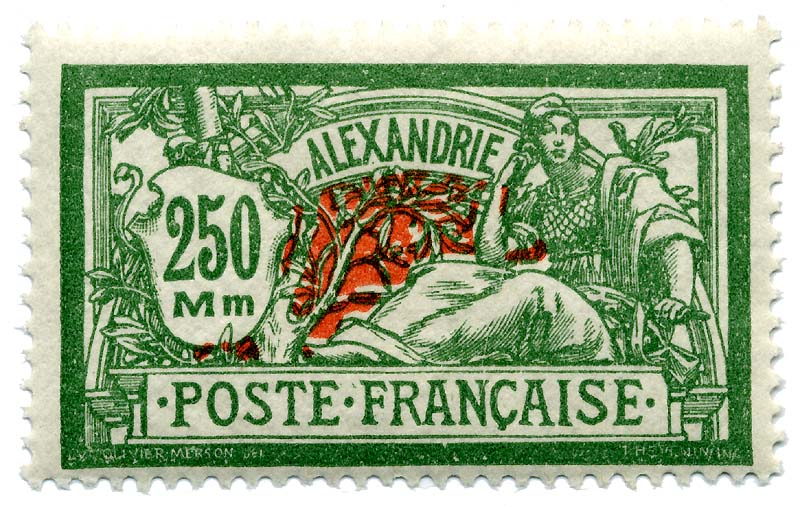
250-millieme Type Merson for Alexandria, 1927

In 1927 and 1928 the old designs were reprinted but with millieme values substituted, ranging from 3 m to 250 m.

== See also ==
- Postage stamps and postal history of Egypt

== Sources ==
- Stanley Gibbons Ltd: various catalogues
- AskPhil – Glossary of Stamp Collecting Terms
- Encyclopaedia of Postal History
- Rossiter, Stuart & John Flower. The Stamp Atlas. London: Macdonald, 1986. ISBN 0-356-10862-7

== Annotations ==
"Mm" as shown on some stamps means milliemes.
