= French post offices in Crete =

Postal Office Operated in Crete By French Post

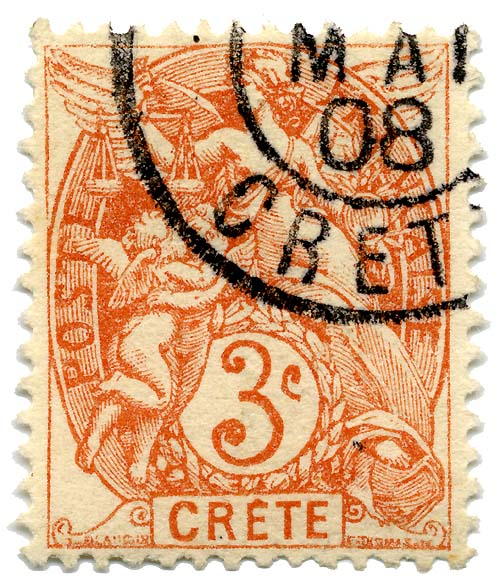
3-centime Type Blanc, used in May 1908

The French post offices in Crete were among a collection of post offices maintained by foreign countries during the late 1800s/early 1900s, after Crete had broken away from the Ottoman Empire, and until 1914 after Crete united with Greece in 1913. The offices were in Chania LA CANEE Rethymnon RETHYMNO Heraklion CANDIE Sitia SITIA Ierapetra HIERAPETRA and Agios Nikolaos SAN NICOLO; the last three were already closed end of 1899

France issued postage stamps for its offices in Crete in 1902 and 1903. The first set included 15 values, from one centime to five francs, consisting of the design of the French stamps of 1900, modified to be inscribed "CRETE". This was only a partial solution, since the local currency was still in piastres, and so in 1903 the post offices issued five of the larger values surcharged with values from one to twenty piastres.

== Sources ==
- Stanley Gibbons Ltd: various catalogues
- AskPhil – Glossary of Stamp Collecting Terms
- Encyclopaedia of Postal History
- Rossiter, Stuart & John Flower. The Stamp Atlas. London: Macdonald, 1986. ISBN 0-356-10862-7
