= Jewish–Ukrainian relations in Eastern Galicia =

Interethnic relations in western Ukraine during 1795–1944

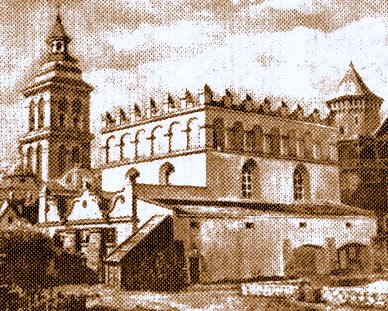
Golden Rose synagogue in Lviv, Ukraine. Destroyed during World War II, it was the oldest synagogue in Ukraine

Eastern Galicia refers to the heartland of the medieval Kingdom of Galicia–Volhynia, currently spread over the provinces of Lviv, Ivano-Frankivsk, and Ternopil in modern western Ukraine. Along with Poles and Ukrainians, Jews were one of the three largest ethnic groups in Eastern Galicia with almost 900,000 people by 1910. From the late 18th century until the early 20th century, eastern Galicia had the largest concentration of Jews of any region in Europe.

== Under Austria (later Austria-Hungary) during 1795–1918 ==
In 1795, Poland was divided between Russia, Prussia and Austria. Eastern Galicia became a part of Austria. Relations between Jews and Ukrainians were much more peaceful on the Austrian side of the post-1795 border than they were in the territories east of the Zbruch river that had become a part of Russia. The multiple pogroms that occurred in Russian-ruled Ukraine did not spread across the border into Galicia. Whatever anti-Jewish political agitation existed in Galicia was limited to Polish political parties operating in areas where not many Ukrainians lived.

The national agitation that emerged among the Ukrainian community in the second half of the 19th century was anti-Polish and anti-Jewish in nature. Such was the nature of the newspaper Batkivshchyna, founded in 1879, that in its very first issue it declared that Ukrainians in Galicia have "two terrible enemies: one of them is the clever Jew, who sucks our blood and gnaws our flesh; the other is the haughty Pole, who is after both our body and soul." In 1881, Batkivshchyna praised the anti-Jewish pogroms happening in Russian Ukraine as being directed against exploitation and truly Cossack in spirit, but advised against organizing them in Galicia, since in the end only Jews gain from them.

Jews in Eastern Galicia were more likely to cooperate with Poles than Ukrainians, due to the superior political role of Poles, fear of pogroms by the mainly Ukrainian peasantry, and historically good relations between the Polish landed gentry and the Jewish community. Assimilation into Polish culture was also much higher than into Ukrainian culture, especially in 1880s. In the Austrian census of 1900, in which Yiddish could not be given, 77% of Jews gave Polish as their language of intercourse, 17% gave German, and only 5% gave Ukrainian.

Thus, while in the first election of 1873, Jewish assimilationists and Conservatives with pro-German views formed a joint bloc with Ukrainians, in the elections of 1879 and 1885 Jews formed an alliance with Poles. Jewish candidates ran on Polish lists and entered the Polish Circle in parliament. In the 1907 elections, Jews, specifically Zionists, after introduction of the universal manhood suffrage, allied themselves again with the Ukrainians. As a result, the Ukrainian national movement in Galicia opposed the Jews as allies of the Polish nobility.

Another pattern of conflicts was the economic competition. During the mid to late nineteenth century, Ukrainian community organizations created cooperatives and credit unions in which Ukrainians (mostly peasants) pooled their resources to buy and sell products collectively, without middlemen, and to obtain loans at low interest. Because the professions of moneylending and shopkeeping had traditionally been Jewish vocations in Galicia, the cooperative movement – whose focus was on keeping Ukrainian capital within the Ukrainian community – also created considerable financial hardship for the local Jewish community, by eliminating many Jewish jobs. The financial hardship caused antagonism between the two communities and was a cause for Jewish emigration from Galicia.

To an extent, increasing Ukrainian nationalism also contributed to greater self-awareness among the Jews of Galicia and served as an example for Jews adopting a nationalist or Zionist self-identification.

== During the struggle for independence ==
Following the collapse of Austria-Hungary in November 1918, eastern Galicia came under the control of the West Ukrainian People's Republic, which controlled much of eastern Galicia for approximately nine months before losing its war against Poland. Although relations between Poles and the West Ukrainian People's Republic were antagonistic, those between the Republic and its Jewish citizens was generally neutral or positive. Deep-seated rivalries existed between the Jewish and Polish communities, and antisemitism, particularly supported by the Polish National-Democratic Party, became a feature of Polish national ideology. A wave of pogroms swept parts of Poland in the fall of 1918, and many Jews came to associate the beginning of the armed Polish fight for independence with pogroms. As a result, many Jews came to consider Polish independence as the least desirable option following the first world war.

In contrast to the antagonistic position by Polish authorities towards Jews, the West Ukrainian government actively supported Jewish cultural and political autonomy as a way of promoting its own legitimacy. The West Ukrainian government guaranteed Jewish cultural and national autonomy, provided Jewish communities with self-governing status, and promoted the formation of Jewish national councils which, with the approval of the Western Ukrainian government, in December 1918 established the Central Jewish National Council which represented Jewish interests in relation to the Ukrainian government and to the Western allies. The Council of Ministers of the West Ukrainian People's Republic bought Yiddish-language textbooks and visual aids for Jewish schools and provided assistance to Jewish victims of the Polish pogrom in Lviv. Ukrainian press maintained a friendly attitude towards the West Ukrainian republic's Jewish citizens, and Hebrew and Yiddish schools, cultural institutions and publishers were allowed to function without interference. Approximately one-third of the seats in the national parliament, an amount roughly equal to the share of the population, were reserved for the national minorities (Poles, Jews, Slovaks and others). The Poles boycotted the elections, while the Jews, despite declaring their neutrality in the Polish–Ukrainian conflict, participated and were represented by approximately 10 percent of the delegates. Localized anti-Jewish assaults and robberies by Ukrainian peasants and soldiers, while far fewer in number and less brutal than similar actions by Poles, occurred between January and April 1919. The government publicly condemned such actions, intervened in defence of the Jewish community, and imprisoned and even executed perpetrators of such crimes. The government also respected Jewish declared neutrality during the Polish–Ukrainian conflict. By the orders of Yevhen Petrushevych, it was forbidden to mobilize Jews against their will or to otherwise force them to contribute to the West Ukrainian military effort. In an effort to aid Western Ukraine's economy, the Western Ukrainian government granted concessions to Jewish merchants.

The West Ukrainian government's friendly attitudes towards Jews were reciprocated by many members of the Jewish community. Although Jewish political organizations officially declared their neutrality in the Polish-Ukrainian struggle, many individual Jews offered their support or sympathized with the West Ukrainian government in its conflict with Poland. Jewish officers of the defunct Austro-Hungarian Army joined the West Ukrainian military, and Jewish judges, lawyers, doctors and railroad employees joined the West Ukrainian civil service. From November 1918, ethnic Poles in the civil service who refused to pledge loyalty to the West Ukrainian government either quit en masse or were fired; these positions were filled by large numbers of Jews, who were willing to support the Ukrainian state. Jews served as judges and legal consultants in the courts in Ternopil, Stanislaviv, and Kolomyia. Jews were also able to create their own police units, and in some locations the Ukrainian government gave local Jewish militias responsibility for the maintenance of security and order. In the regions of Sambir and Radekhiv, approximately a third of the police force were Jews. Jews fielded their own battalion in the army of the West Ukrainian People's Republic. and Jewish youths worked as scouts for the West Ukrainian military. In general, Jews made up the largest group of non-ethnic Ukrainians who participated in all branches of the West Ukrainian government.

The liberal attitudes towards Jews by the West Ukrainian government could be attributed to the cultural influence of Austria-Hungary, whose tradition of inter-ethnic tolerance and cooperation affected the West Ukrainian intelligentsia and military officers of the late nineteenth and early twentieth centuries.

== Between the First and Second World Wars ==
After Polish victory over the West Ukrainian People's Republic in the Polish–Ukrainian War, Galicia's Jews and Ukrainians found themselves living within the Polish state – and were that state's largest ethnic minority groups. During this time relations between the two communities were initially positive – reflecting decades of previous cooperation – but subsequently deteriorated. In the early 1920s Ukrainians and Jews, at the initiative of Jewish leader Yitzhak Gruenbaum, formed a unified Bloc of National Minorities which sought to defend both groups' interests in the Polish government.

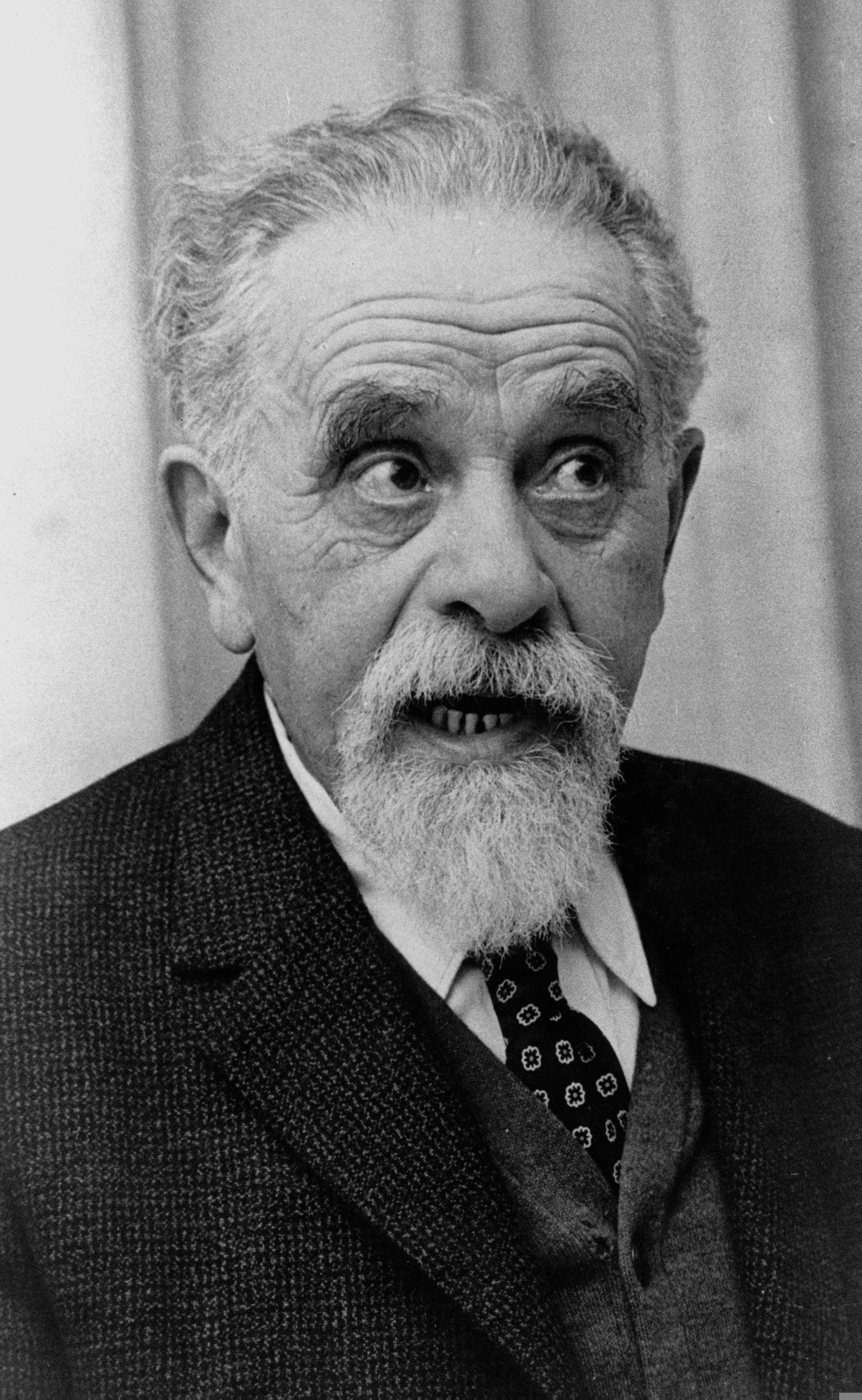
Yitzhak Gruenbaum, Jewish leader who initiated the Bloc of National Minorities in Poland that brought together Ukrainian and Jewish political parties

Relations between Ukrainians and Jews soured somewhat when, in 1925, Jewish political leaders signed a separate agreement with Poland in order to guarantee certain rights for their community. Ukrainian leaders accused Jews of preferring to reach an agreement with the Polish government instead of maintaining solidarity with the Ukrainians. The assassination in 1926 of Symon Petliura, Ukraine's exiled president, by Sholom Schwartzbard – a Jewish relative of victims of pogroms in central Ukraine – served to significantly furthermore undermine Ukrainian Galician attitudes towards Jews. Although Petliura was unpopular in Galicia due to his agreement to cede Galicia to Poland in exchange for Polish assistance in the war against the Soviet Union, his assassination and the subsequent acquittal of Schwartzbard sparked outrage within the Galician Ukrainian community. It was widely assumed that Schwartzbard was a communist agent, and his assassination of Petliura promoted the stereotype of Jewish cooperation with Bolshevism. The assassin's acquittal by a French court and defence by a French lawyer – and his support from the Jewish community around the world – suggested to many Ukrainian Galicians that the Western democracies, Jews, and Communists were all opposed to the idea of an independent Ukraine – an idea that contributed to Galicians' orientation towards Germany in the interwar period. In 1930, the coalition between the Jewish and Ukrainian parties collapsed due to the Ukrainian parties no longer wanting to run under its name. When in 1935 the largest Ukrainian political party, the Ukrainian National Democratic Alliance, came to an understanding with the Polish state, antisemitic actions – neither encouraged nor condemned by Ukrainian leaders – increased within Ukrainian society.

In spite of the worsening attitudes towards Jews within the Ukrainian community, political cooperation between Jews and Ukrainians did continue throughout the 1930s. When the Polish government attempted to limit the kosher slaughter of meat, Ukrainian political parties voted alongside their Jewish colleagues against this ban out of a feeling that limiting Jewish practices would set a precedent for limitations of their own traditions by the Polish state. This act of solidarity with the Jews was then condemned in the Polish press. When Jews were attacked by Poles in Brześć in 1937, an article in the Ukrainian press condemning this pogrom was titled "After the Jews Will Come Our Turn." In the face of increasing anti-Ukrainian actions by the Polish state, Ukrainian leaders began to once again call for cooperation between Jews and Ukrainians, while at the same time condemning supposed Jewish support for Communism. In spite of their criticism towards Jews, Ukrainian political leaders consistently rejected Polish offers of mutual cooperation against the Jews.

While the mainstream Ukrainian political parties cooperated with the Jews, and the leaders of the largest Ukrainian political parties refused to explicitly encourage antisemitic acts, the underground radical rightist Organization of Ukrainian Nationalists (OUN) – operating illegally in Galicia – developed close ties with the Nazi regime in Germany. Founded in 1929, the OUN was originally a fringe movement within eastern Galicia, although its popularity grew throughout the 1930s in response to Polish persecution against the Ukrainian community, often provoked by the OUN's terrorism. Initially supportive of Jews, the OUN later spread propaganda against Jews and organized attacks against them, such as during village riots in the Sokal area in 1933.

== During the Soviet Annexation of Western Ukraine (1939–41) ==
In September 1939, Poland was invaded and divided between Nazi Germany and the Soviet Union (USSR), with most of Eastern Galicia falling under Soviet rule. Although the Soviets initially sought to win over the local Ukrainian population, their policies grew increasingly repressive. Ukrainian organizations not controlled by the Soviets were limited or abolished. Hundreds of credit unions and cooperatives that had served the Ukrainian people between the wars were shut down, and Ukrainian libraries, reading rooms, and newspapers were similarly closed. Mass arrests led to the deportation of up to 500,000 Ukrainians from regions annexed by the USSR between 1939 and the German invasion.

During Soviet rule, eastern Galicia experienced a large influx of Jewish refugees fleeing Nazi terror on the other side of the new German-Soviet border; hundreds of thousands of Jews arrived in the territories newly annexed by the USSR. The civilian administration in those regions annexed from Poland was drawn mostly from the occupation force of eastern Ukrainians and Russians; only 20% of government employees were from the local population. It was falsely assumed by many Ukrainians that a disproportionate number of people working for the Soviet administration which was repressing western Ukrainians came from within the Galician Jewish community. The reason for this belief was that most of the previous Polish administrators were deported, and the local Ukrainian intelligentsia who could have taken their place were generally deemed to be too nationalistic for such work by the Soviets. In reality, although Ukrainians and Jews replaced the Polish administrators, most positions were staffed by ethnic Ukrainians from the Soviet Union. Nevertheless, in the eyes of many Ukrainians, the Jews came to be associated with Soviet rule, which contributed to rising anti-Jewish sentiments. In addition, Jews were often blamed by Ukrainians for allegedly denouncing Ukrainians to the Soviet authorities, resulting in the Ukrainians' arrest and deportation. This idea also served to markedly increase antisemitic feelings among Ukrainians.

The rising tide in Galicia of anti-Jewish sentiment among Ukrainians during Soviet rule was accompanied by the complete removal from Ukrainian society of moderate or liberal forces within that society when the Soviet authorities abolished all local Ukrainian political parties and arrested and deported most of the moderate politicians it could find – such as Dr. Dmytro Levitsky, the head of the moderate, left-leaning Ukrainian National Democratic Alliance, and chief of the Ukrainian delegation in the pre-war Polish parliament. Ultimately 20,000 to 30,000 Ukrainian activists would flee Galicia to German-occupied territory. The elimination by the Soviets of the individuals, organizations, and parties that represented moderate or liberal political tendencies within Ukrainian society left the extremist, violent, and increasingly antisemitic Organization of Ukrainian Nationalists – which operated in the underground – as the only political party with a significant organizational presence left among western Ukrainians.

== Under German rule (1941–1944) ==
=== During the Conquest ===
When the Germans conquered eastern Galicia in 1941, they exploited Ukrainians' perceptions of the links between Jews and Communism and encouraged brutal acts of revenge against the Jewish community by Ukrainians. The Germans flooded Ukraine with anti-Jewish propaganda and anti-Semitic posters. Immediately before withdrawing from western Ukraine, Soviet security forces massacred over 4,000 prisoners in Lviv and around 10,000 throughout western Ukraine in other prisons. Although Jews had also been among the victims of the Soviet massacres, they were accused as a group by some Ukrainians of having cooperated with the Soviets. Before the massacre, the Germans and the Ukrainians spread rumors implicating the Jews in killing Ukrainian political prisoners. Crowds of Ukrainians – sometimes relatives of those murdered – assaulted, tortured, raped and murdered Jewish civilians as German soldiers took pictures. The Ukrainian People's Militia (which soon became the Ukrainian Auxiliary Police) hastily created by the Organization of Ukrainian Nationalists after the occupation of Lviv participated in this pogrom. During the four-week pogrom from the end of June to early July 1941, it is estimated that nearly 6,000 Jews were murdered. Similar actions throughout eastern Galicia would claim tens of thousands more Jewish lives.

=== Under German administration ===
Due to Nazi antisemitic policies, Ukrainians willing to work in the civil service or state administration often chose to adopt antisemitism in order to become favored by the German overlords. Thus, many Ukrainians who before the war had not shown antisemitism or who had even been friendly towards Jews adopted a sort of "circumstantial antisemitism" in order to help their careers and acquire wealth or power in the new administration. Ukrainian police, who organized the "Petliura Days" pogrom in Lviv in 1941 which claimed between 2,000 and 5,000 lives, were particularly prone to anti-Jewish activities but were not alone in doing so. For example, in Zbarazh, Ukrainian students marched through the town singing anti-Jewish slogans before destroying the Jewish cemetery's headstones, and a pogrom in the town of Delatyn was organized by a local Ukrainian music teacher.

The underground Organization of Ukrainian Nationalists (OUN) displayed an ambivalent attitude towards Jews. According to German documents, the wartime OUN was willing to either kill or to help Jews depending on what they believed was more politically advantageous to them. During the war, the Ukrainian Insurgent Army (UPA), a large underground military force controlled by the OUN, engaged in the ethnic cleansing and killing of Poles and destruction of Polish villages. Jews hiding from the Germans with Poles in Polish villages were frequently killed by the UPA along with their Polish saviors, although in at least one case they were spared as the Poles were murdered. The UPA, many of whose leaders believed in a link between Jews and Bolsheviks and who saw that Jews tended to join underground Communist partisan groups, also liquidated bands of armed Jews hiding from the Germans in the forests. In some cases, they even coordinated their activities with the Germans. Despite the UPA's involvement in the killing of some Jews, there were cases of Jewish participation within the ranks of the UPA, including fighters and medical personnel.

In contrast to the antisemitic crimes committed both by members of the administration working for the Germans and by the Ukrainian anti-German Underground, many individual Ukrainians helped to conceal Jews. According to German documents, between October 1943 and June 1944, approximately 100 Ukrainians in Galicia were sentenced to death for hiding Jews. Philip Friedman notes that this implies a large number of Ukrainians aiding Jews, because the 100 executed represents only those who were caught (many more were never caught, or were given lighter sentences rather than executed), that often those found hiding Jews were executed immediately without a trial and therefore without their cases making it into official records, and the death sentences cover only a limited period of time. Those rescuing Jews include former servants, peasants, members of the Ukrainian intelligentsia, and middle class. Foresters frequently helped Jews hiding in the woods. For example, with the help of 35 Ukrainian and 5 Polish foresters, 1,700 Jews were concealed in the forests of Przemyslany district according to a report by a Ukrainian forester.

The Ukrainian Greek Catholic Church played a particularly helpful role for the Jews during the war. Its leader, Andrey Sheptytsky, was described by Philip Friedman as "always friendly" towards Jews, proficient in the Hebrew language and who communicated with the Jewish community in the Hebrew language. In February 1942, Sheptytsky addressed a letter to Heinrich Himmler condemning anti-Jewish actions which resulted in the German administration closing the Ukrainian National Council. In November 1942, Sheptytsky published an article in the official newspaper of the Ukrainian Catholic church entitled "Thou Shalt Not Murder" and threatened those who murdered for political reasons with excommunication. Not limiting his actions to words, Sheptytsky played an active role in saving members of the Jewish community. Sheptytsky at his own residence hid fifteen Jews, including Lviv rabbi David Kahane and two sons of Lviv's chief rabbi Ezekial Lewin. Additionally, he and his brother, the monk Klymentiy Sheptytsky, concealed 150 Jews, primarily children, in Ukrainian Catholic Studite monasteries. In contrast to such activities, some Ukrainian village priests incited people against the Jews, although others saved them.

== See also ==
- Borshchiv Ghetto

== Bibliography ==
- Himka, John-Paul (1990). "Ukrainian - Jewish Relations in Historical Perspective". In Aster, Howard; Potichnyj, Peter J. (eds.). Ukrainian-Jewish Antagonism in the Galician Countryside During the Late Nineteenth Century. Edmonton.
