= Postage stamps and postal history of West Ukrainian National Republic =

The West Ukrainian National Republic was a short-lived republic that existed in late 1918 and early 1919 in eastern Galicia. The republic managed to issue about one hundred types of postage stamps during its brief existence, all but two of which are overprints on existing stamps of Austria or Bosnia.

== The 1918–1923 stamps issues ==
=== First stamps in November 1918 ===
The first were four overprints of Austria overprinted in Lviv, with a design of a lion and the inscription "Zakhidno-Ukrainska Narodna Republika" were in use for only two days there. Another four Austrian stamps were surcharged with "УКР.Н.Р" (ukr.n.r in Cyrillic), and a new denomination in shahs (шаг), one with 5 sh and three with 10 sh. These are rather uncommon today, with prices for collectors ranging from €80 to €800 (US$100–1000), and forgeries are plentiful.

=== The 1919 stamps ===
In March 1919, officials in Stanislaviv surcharged sixteen values of 1916 Austrian stamps with "ПОШТА// УКР.Н.РЕП." (POSHTA UKR.N.REP.) and denominations ranging from three shahs up to ten hryvnia. The same surcharge was also applied to Austrian military stamps and postage due stamps, as well as to the 1904 postage dues of Bosnia.

In May, Austrian stamps were overprinted with the Ukrainian trident-in-shield arms with the letters "З. У. Н. Р." (Z. U. N. R.), one at each corner, for "West Ukrainian People's Republic". These saw very little use, and forged cancellations are commonplace.

The sole non-overprinted issue was a pair of registration stamps issued in Kolomyia, in the form of a label used for registered mail, but unlike most labels, denominated with values of thirty and fifty shahs, to pay registration fees.

Of the stamps issued, only the trident overprints are common, with the others being rare.

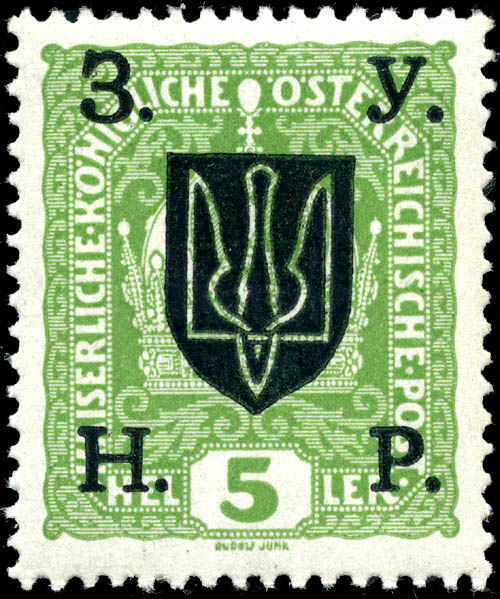
May 1919 overprint on a 5 heller stamp of Austrian Monarchy

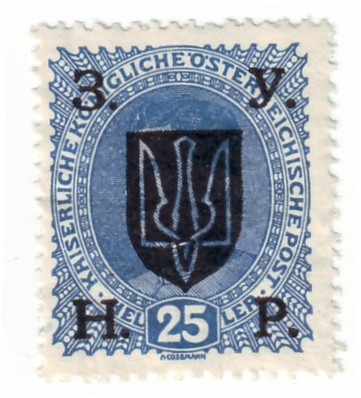
May 1919 Overprint on a 25 heller
