= Revenue stamps of Ethiopia =

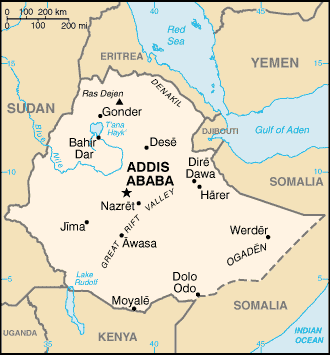
Map of Ethiopia

Ethiopia issued revenue stamps from when it was an independent empire onwards.

== Revenue ==
Ethiopia's first revenues were issued in 1930. The earliest issue consisted of four stamps printed by Waterlow and Sons, with a Lion of Judah in the centre. This issue exists either with a background design of ornamental scallops or with a plain background.

The Ethiopian Empire fell to Italy at the end of the Second Italo-Ethiopian War in 1936. During the Italian occupation, various revenue stamps inscribed Africa Italiana, Africa Orientale Italiana (Italian East Africa) or Colonie Italiane were used in Ethiopia, as well as in Italian Eritrea and Italian Somaliland. The cities of Addis Ababa, Dire Daua and Gondar also issued municipal revenue issues.

In the ensuing period, postage stamps were initially overprinted for fiscal use, and later a new set similar to the 1930 issue was printed. The stamps still depicted the Lion of Judah. Between 1948 and 1964, these were issued several times, denominated in Maria Theresa Dollars or Ethiopian birr.

After the Derg came to power during the Ethiopian Civil War, revenue stamps were issued in a similar design to the imperial issues but with different coats of arms and inscriptions. These exist for the Provisional Military Government of Socialist Ethiopia, the People's Democratic Republic of Ethiopia and the Federal Democratic Republic of Ethiopia.

The emblems which appeared on Ethiopian revenue stamps are as follows:

1930-1974

1974-1987

1987-1991

1995–present

== Other types of revenues ==
There were various other types of revenues issued in Ethiopia:

- Airport Passenger Service Charge
- Alcohol Tax
- Salt Tax
- Tobacco Monopoly

The Chamber of Commerce of Addis Abeba had its own revenues from 1949 to 1969. When Eritrea was part of Ethiopia, it still had separate revenues until the 1960s.

== See also ==
- Postage stamps and postal history of Ethiopia
- Revenue stamps of Eritrea
