= Eastern Galicia =

Geographical region in Ukraine and Poland

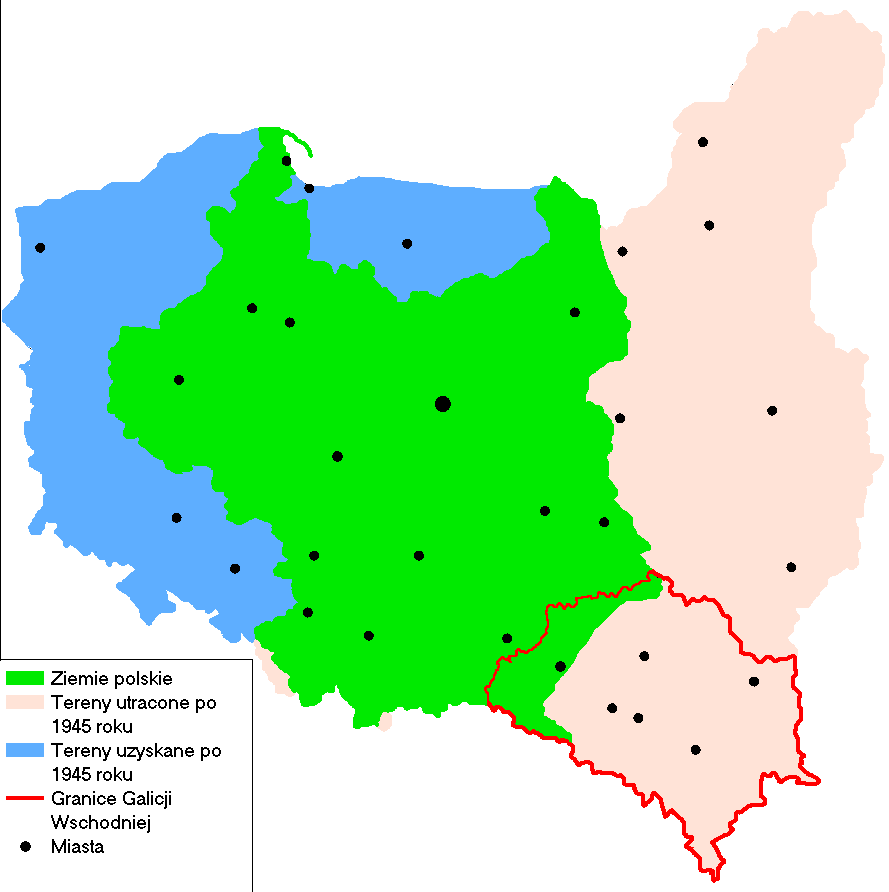
Eastern Galicia (outlined in red) shown on a map comparing pre-war and post-war Polish borders

Eastern Galicia (Ukrainian: Східна Галичина, romanized: Skhidna Halychyna; Polish: Galicja Wschodnia; Rusyn: Всхідня Галичына, romanized: Vskhidnya Halichyna; Yiddish: מזרח גאַליציע, German: Ostgalizien) is a geographical region comprising the eastern portion of the historical, Austro-Hungarian-defined region of Galicia in Eastern Europe, corresponding roughly with the historical region of Red Ruthenia (excluding the Chełm Land). It includes parts of Western Ukraine (present day oblasts of Lviv and Ivano-Frankivsk, most of Ternopil Oblast) and Southeastern Poland (parts of present day Subcarpathian and Lublin Voivodeships). It has an essential historic importance in Poland which it was an integral part of until 1939.

Before World War II Eastern Galicia had a mixed population consisting of a Ukrainian (Ruthenian) overall majority, with a Polish plurality (majority) in urban areas, as well as Carpatho-Rusyn, Ashkenazi Jewish, Forest German and other minorities. It was one of the two major regions of wartime Poland affected by the Massacres of Poles in Volhynia and Eastern Galicia, which is characterized by Polish sources as a genocide. Its Polish portion was also the site of the post-war Operation Vistula, a Stalinist-led effort to purge UPA activity from the region through forced resettlement. Though aimed at eliminating Ukrainian nationalist elements and guerillas who had been using the mountainous geography of the region for raids on Polish border troops, the resettlement instead disproportionately affected Poland's autochthonous Lemko minority, a majority of whom identified as Rusyns rather than Ukrainians.

Galicia was formed within the Austrian Empire during the years 1772–1918 when it was the Kingdom of Galicia and Lodomeria. Eastern Galicia now includes all of the Lviv and Ivano-Frankivsk Oblasts (regions) of Ukraine as well as most of the Ternopil Oblast, barring its northern stretches of the former Kremenets, Shumsk and Lanivtsi Raions and the northern part of Zbarazh Raion. On the other hand, the western part of Eastern Galicia is located in Poland (the eastern part of the Subcarpathian Voivodeship, including Przemyśl, Sanok, Jarosław, Lubaczów, Lesko, the Bieszczady Mountains, and surrounding areas). A smaller portion of Eastern Galicia, the town of Lubycza Królewska and its surrounding area, is also located in the Lublin Voivodeship. However, Tomaszów Lubelski, 15 km away, is no longer part of Galicia, nor did it belong to the Austrian state during the partitions of Poland: it was made a part of Congress Poland, and therefore of the Russian Empire, following the abolition of the Duchy of Warsaw. The area of Eastern Galicia is about 46,800 km^{2} (18,100 sq miles).

== History ==
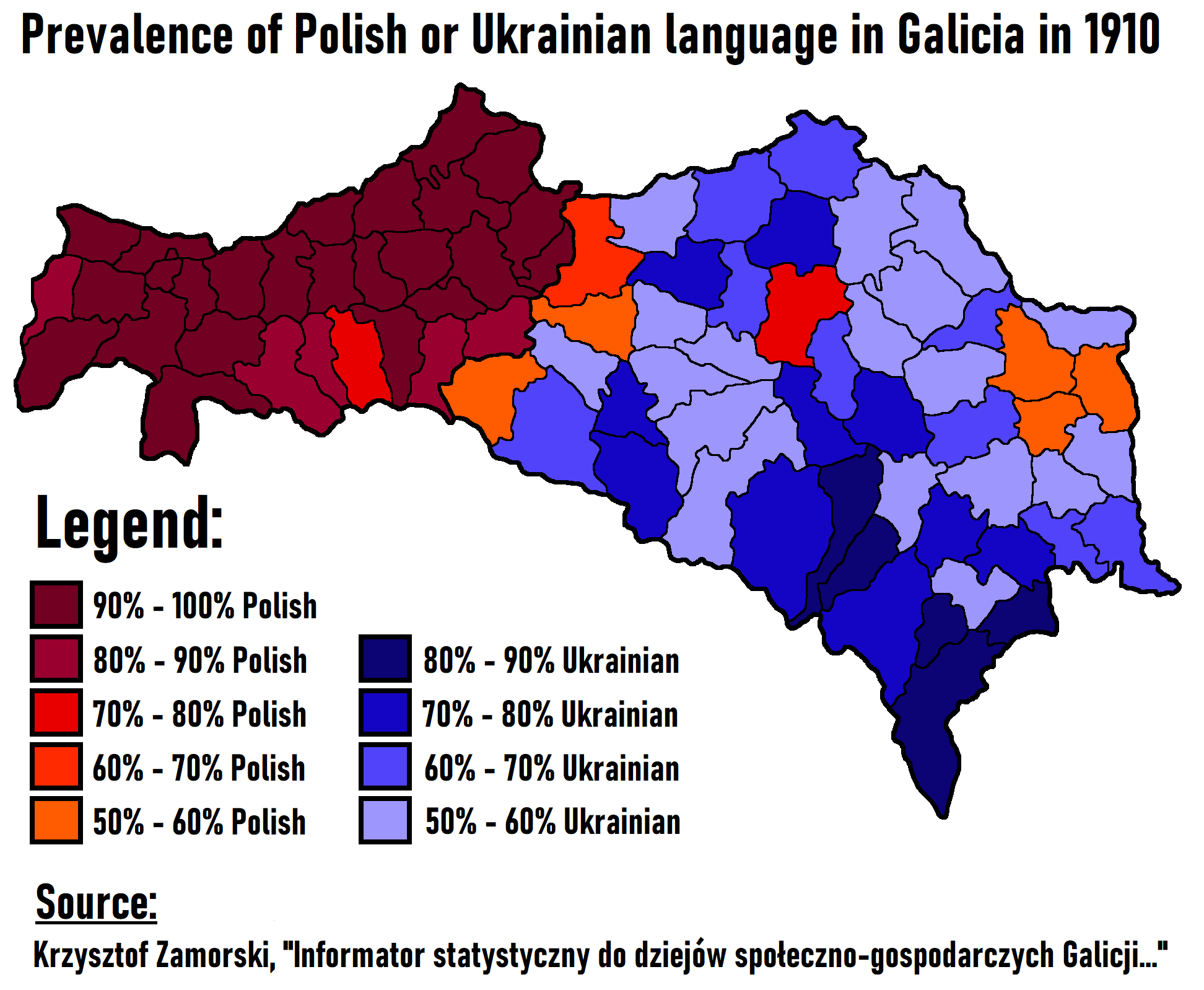
Language map of Galicia according to the 1910 Austro-Hungarian census. Eastern Galicia was a predominantly Ukrainian-speaking region.

In 1918, Western Galicia became a part of the restored Republic of Poland, which absorbed part of the Lemko region. The local Ukrainian population declared the independence of Eastern Galicia as the West Ukrainian People's Republic. The predominantly Polish population of Lviv (then Lwów or Lemberg) resisted, which led to the Polish-Ukrainian War during which the Poles took control of all of Galicia. In a pact with Poland, Symon Petliura, leader of the Ukrainian People's Republic ceded Eastern Galicia in exchange for help against the Soviets. During the Polish–Soviet War, the Soviets established in July 1920 in Eastern Galicia the short-lived Galician Soviet Socialist Republic.

The Peace of Riga of 18 March 1921 assigned the contested Eastern Galicia to the Second Polish Republic. The Entente powers recognized the Polish possession of the territory on 14 March 1923.

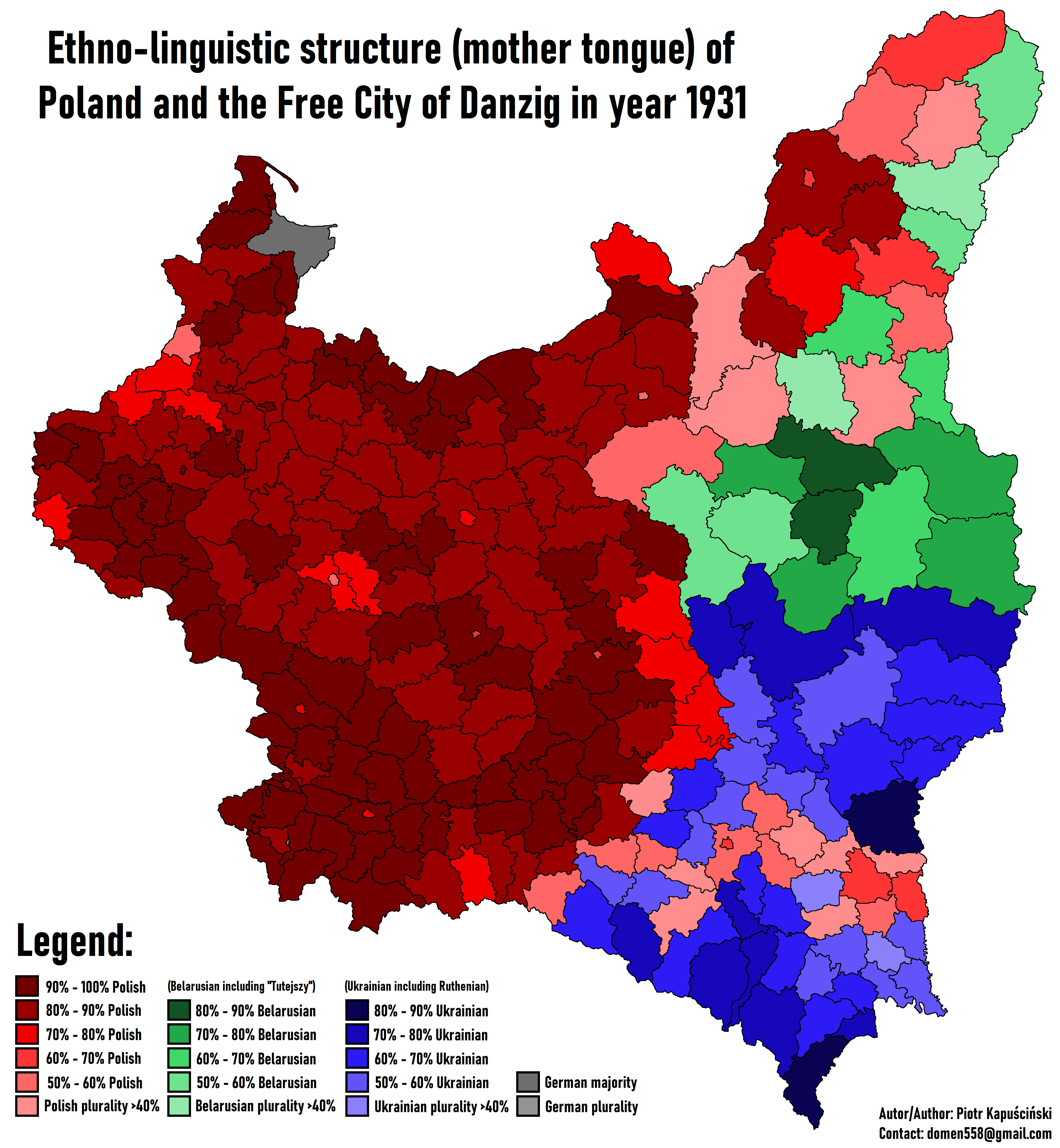
The predominantly Polish-speaking areas of Eastern Galicia have noticeably expanded between the 1910 and the 1931 censuses, although Ukrainian-speakers remained the largest linguistic group in the region.

The Ukrainians of the former Eastern Galicia and the neighbouring province of Volhynia made up about 12% of the population of the Second Polish Republic and were its largest minority. As the Polish government's policies were unfriendly towards minorities, tensions between the Polish government and the Ukrainian population grew, which eventually gave the rise to the militant underground Organization of Ukrainian Nationalists.

=== Eastern Lesser Poland ===
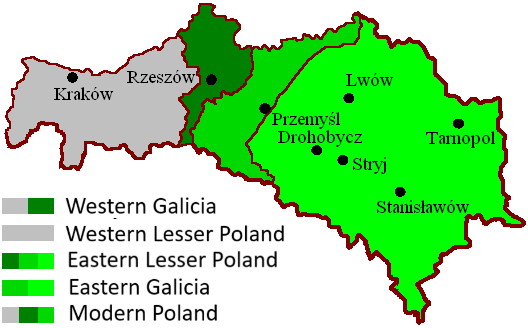
A map of Galicia with historical borders. Eastern Lesser Poland is a combination of all shades of green, Eastern Galicia is designated by two lighter shades of green

In the interbellum period, the former Austrian province of Galicia, then a part of Poland, was called Lesser Poland. Western Galicia, to the San river, was called Western Lesser Poland, while Eastern Galicia, east of the San, with the city of Lwów (Lviv), was called Eastern Lesser Poland (Polish: Małopolska Wschodnia) and included voivodeships of Tarnopol, Stanisławów, and Lwów). According to a Polish historian Jan Pisuliński, using the term Eastern Lesser Poland to denominate Eastern Galicia is incorrect, as it has no historical justification, being only a designation of nationalist and propaganda significance (similarly to analogous term Western Ukraine used at the same time by the Ukrainian side), which served in the 1920s and 1930s to make a stronger connection of the area between rivers of San and Zbruch with the Polish state and to emphasize the allegedly indigenously Polish nature of that region.

In territorial terms, Eastern Lesser Poland was not fully identical to Eastern Galicia during the Austrian Partition. As a result of the administrative division of the former Austrian Partition territories included in the Second Polish Republic as defined on 23 December 1920, the border of Eastern Lesser Poland in relation to Eastern Galicia was moved significantly to the west. The following counties were incorporated into the Lviv Voivodeship: Tarnobrzeg, Rzeszów, Łańcut, Nisko, Kolbuszowa, Przeworsk, Strzyżów, and Krosno were previously parts of the Lviv appellate court district, the western border of which was the conventional border of Eastern Galicia within Austria-Hungary. The north-western border of Eastern Lesser Poland was marked by the Vistula near Sandomierz.

== Etymology ==
The name Galicia, or Halychyna in Ukrainian, is derived from the city of Halych (Latin Galic) which was the first capital of the Galician principality. The name Halych in turn derives from the Ukrainian word halka which means "female crow", which is reflected by the crow at the center of the city's early modern coat of arms.

Many also believe that the name Halych/Galicz (and from it Halychyna/Galizia) is derived from the Greek word ἅλς (hals), meaning "salt". The Byzantines and the Greeks had a strong influence on these lands and it was from the Greeks that Galicia that was part of Kievan Rus' were converted to Christianity. In fact the Greek word for salt pit is αλυκή (alyki), which makes a strong argument that Halych could be an alteration of that. Halych was rich in salt, which was mined in the region. During the early medieval period, salt was Halych's main export. Today, however, there is no more salt mining in Halych.

== Bibliography ==
- Encyclopedia of Ukraine

== See also ==
- Galicia (Eastern Europe)
- West Galicia
- Russian occupation of Eastern Galicia, 1914–15
- Jewish–Ukrainian relations in Eastern Galicia
- Pacification of Ukrainians in Eastern Galicia
- Massacres of Poles in Volhynia and Eastern Galicia
- Red Ruthenia
- District of Galicia
- Lwów Voivodeship
- Ruthenian Voivodeship

== Footnotes ==
a: Though now usually used to refer to the Austro-Hungarian administrative definition, the name 'Galicia' derives from the medieval city of Halych, part of the Cherven Cities, a region which changed hands frequently between the Kingdom of Galicia–Volhynia (then known simply as Ruthenia; previously Kievan Rus') and the Kingdom of Poland.
