= British military post offices in Africa =

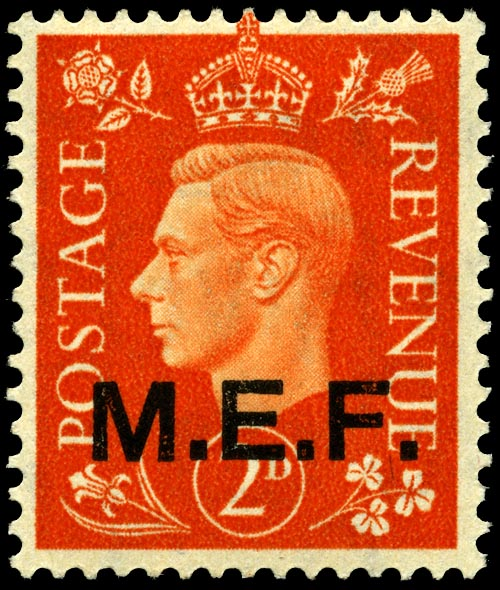
Middle East Forces overprint, 1942

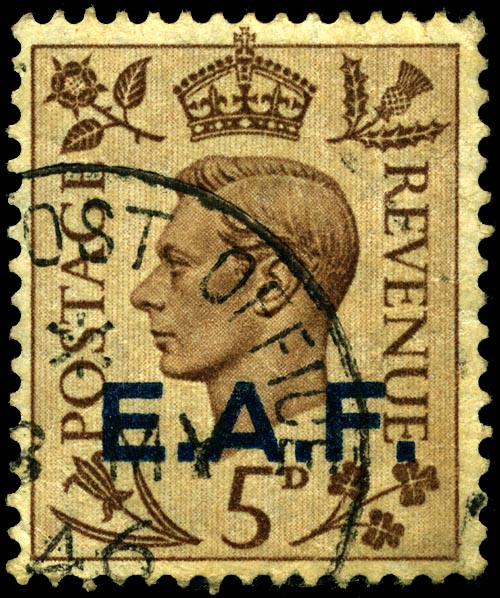
East Africa Forces overprint, 1943

The British post offices in Africa were a system of post offices set up by the United Kingdom to be used by its Middle East Forces and East Africa Forces in Africa during and after World War II.

== Middle East Forces ==
Definitive British stamps were overprinted "M.E.F." beginning in 1942. They were available in Cyrenaica, Eritrea, Ethiopia, and Somalia, Tripolitania as well as in the Dodecanese islands in the Aegean. At the beginning of 1943, the color-changed definitives were also overprinted, and in 1947, the 5-shilling and 10-shilling stamps received the overprint. In 1950, the British government declared that the remaining overprinted stamps were valid for postage throughout the UK, and so many of the surviving stamps have British inland rather than foreign postmarks.

== East Africa Forces ==
The East Africa Forces in Italian Somalia also received British stamps, but overprinted "E.A.F." instead, beginning 15 January 1943.

== Eritrea, Somalia and Tripolitania ==
From 1948 on, the military administrations in Eritrea, Somalia, and Tripolitania used their own overprints.

== See also ==
- Postage stamps and postal history of Eritrea
- Postage stamps and postal history of Libya
- Postage stamps and postal history of Somalia

== Sources ==
- Stanley Gibbons Ltd: various catalogues
- AskPhil – Glossary of Stamp Collecting Terms
- Encyclopaedia of Postal History
- Stuart Rossiter & John Flower: The Stamp Atlas
- Scott catalogue
