= Postage stamps and postal history of Eritrea =

This is a survey of the postage stamps and postal history of Eritrea.

Eritrea is a country in the North East of Africa. The capital is Asmara. It is bordered by Sudan in the west, Ethiopia in the south, and Djibouti in the southeast. The east and northeast of the country have an extensive coastline on the Red Sea, directly across from Saudi Arabia and Yemen. The Dahlak Archipelago and several of the Hanish Islands are part of Eritrea. Its size is just under 118,000 km^{2} (45,560 sq mi) with an estimated population of 5 million.

== First stamps ==
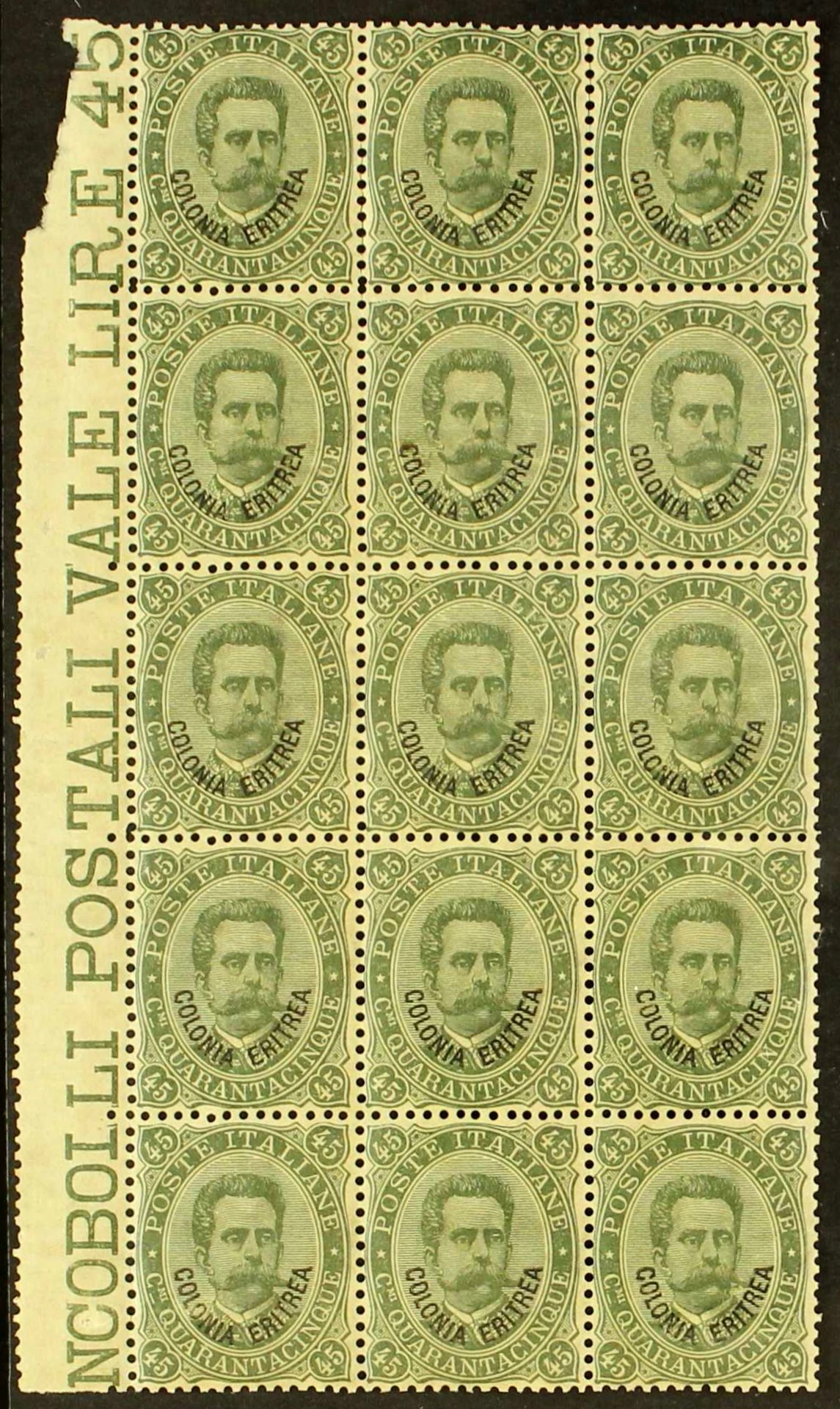
Italian stamps overprinted for Eritrea, 1893

The first stamps of Eritrea were overprinted stamps of Italy issued on 1 January 1893. Before that, Egyptian stamps were used at Massawa between 1869 and 1885 and Italian post offices were established.

== Italian Eritrea ==
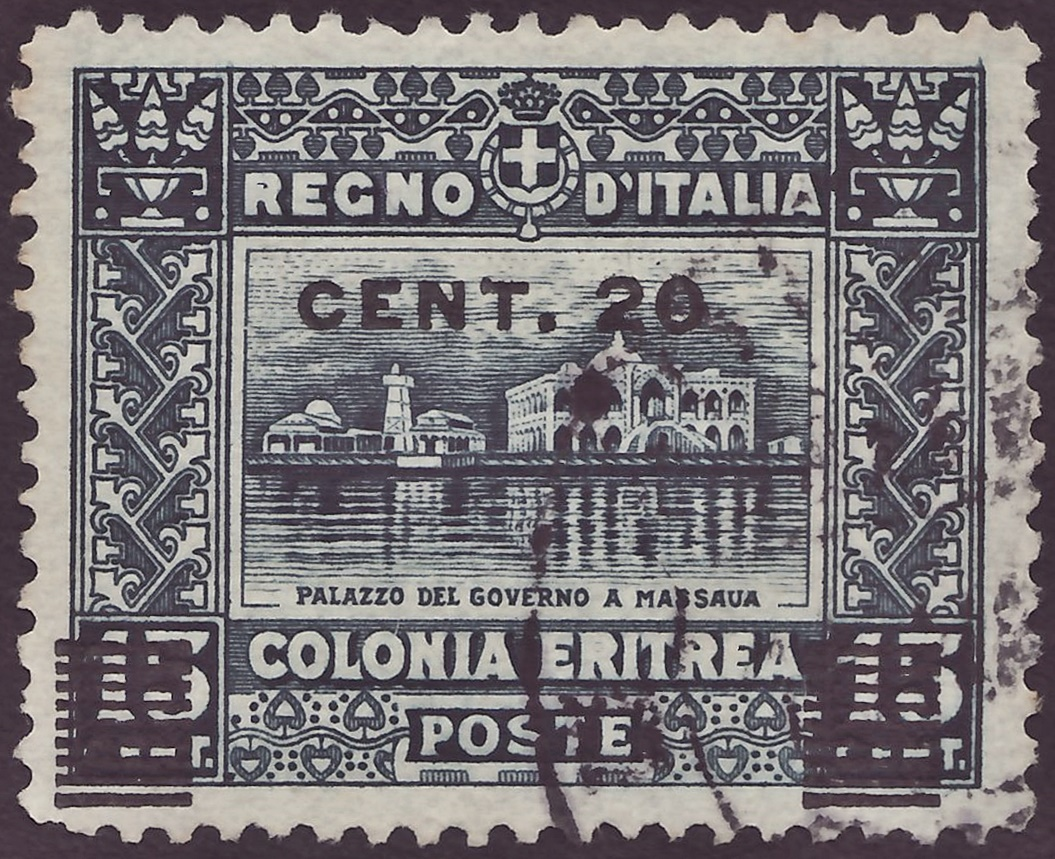
Stamp of Italian Eritrea inscribed COLONIA ERITREA

The first stamps specifically for Eritrea were stamps inscribed COLONIA ERITREA issued in 1910.

== Italian East Africa ==
Eritrea, Ethiopia and Italian Somaliland formed Italian East Africa on 1 June 1936. Stamps were issued on 7 February 1938 and until 1941.

== British occupation ==
After British forces occupied Eritrea and the other Italian colonies during World War II, British postage stamps overprinted M.E.F. (Middle East Forces) were used. These were replaced by issues overprinted B.M.A. ERITREA or later B.A. ERITREA to reflect the change from British military to British civil administration. Stamps overprinted in this way were in use from 1942 to 1952.

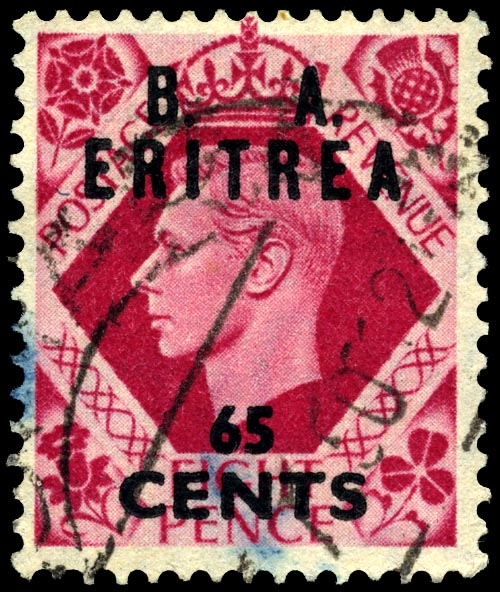
A British stamp overprinted for use in Eritrea

== 1952–1991 ==
Between 1952 and 1991, Eritrea was federated with Ethiopia and used the stamps of Ethiopia.

== Independence ==
The first stamps of independent Eritrea were those issued to mark the independence referendum in 1993.

== See also ==
- Postage stamps and postal history of Italian East Africa
- British military post offices in Africa
- Revenue stamps of Eritrea
