= Military stamp =

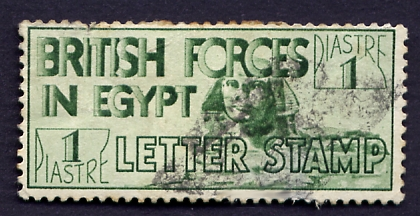
A stamp used by the British Forces in Egypt.

A military stamp, is a postage stamp used by a military organisation, in time of war, or while ensuring a peace keeping operation. Often the letters will be transported by the army itself until they reach the country of destination. These stamps were widely used during World War II by soldiers wishing to send mail home to their families. The usage of these stamps has been somewhat phased out by the appearance of electronic means of communication. Some army issues include:

- China Expeditionary Forces (1900-1921)
- Indian Expeditionary Forces (1914-1922)
- British occupation of Mafia Island (1915-1916)
- British Field Office in Salonica (1916)
- Nyasaland Field Force (1916)
- Egyptian Expeditionary Force (1918)
- Indian Expeditionary Force D (1919)
- British Forces in Egypt (1932-1939)
- Middle East Forces (1942-1947)
- East Africa Forces (1943-1946)
- Indian National Army (World War II)
- Indian Custodian Forces in Korea (1953)
- International Commission in Indo-China (1954-1968)
- Indian UN Force in Congo (1962)
- Indian UN Force in Gaza (1965)
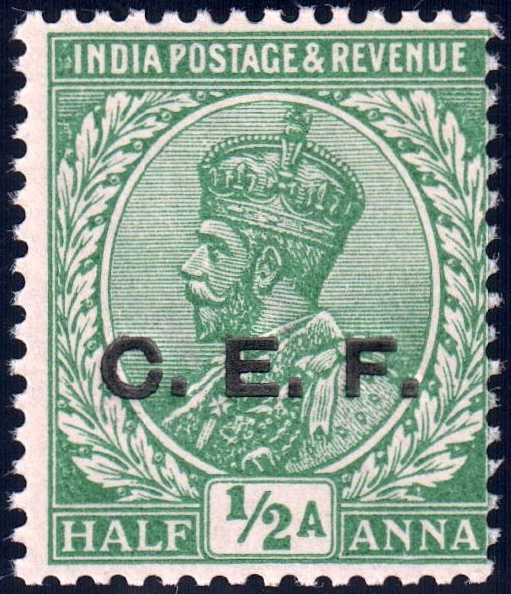
China Expeditionary Forces

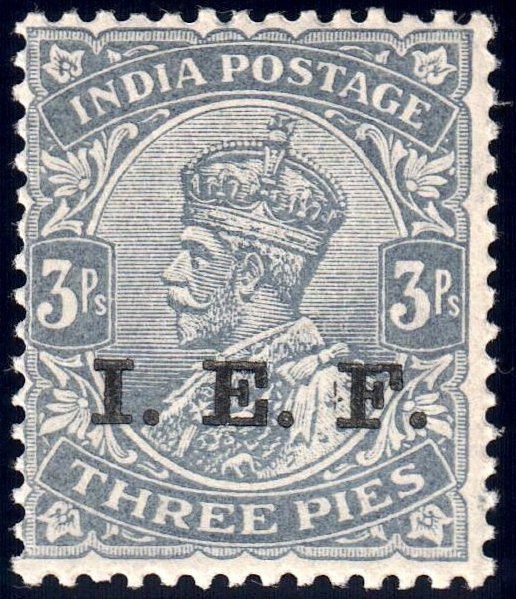
Indian Expeditionary Forces

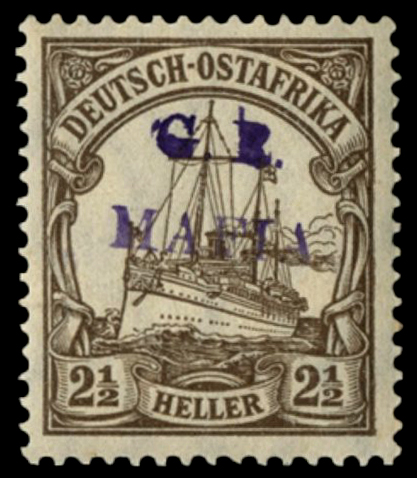
British occupation of Mafia Island

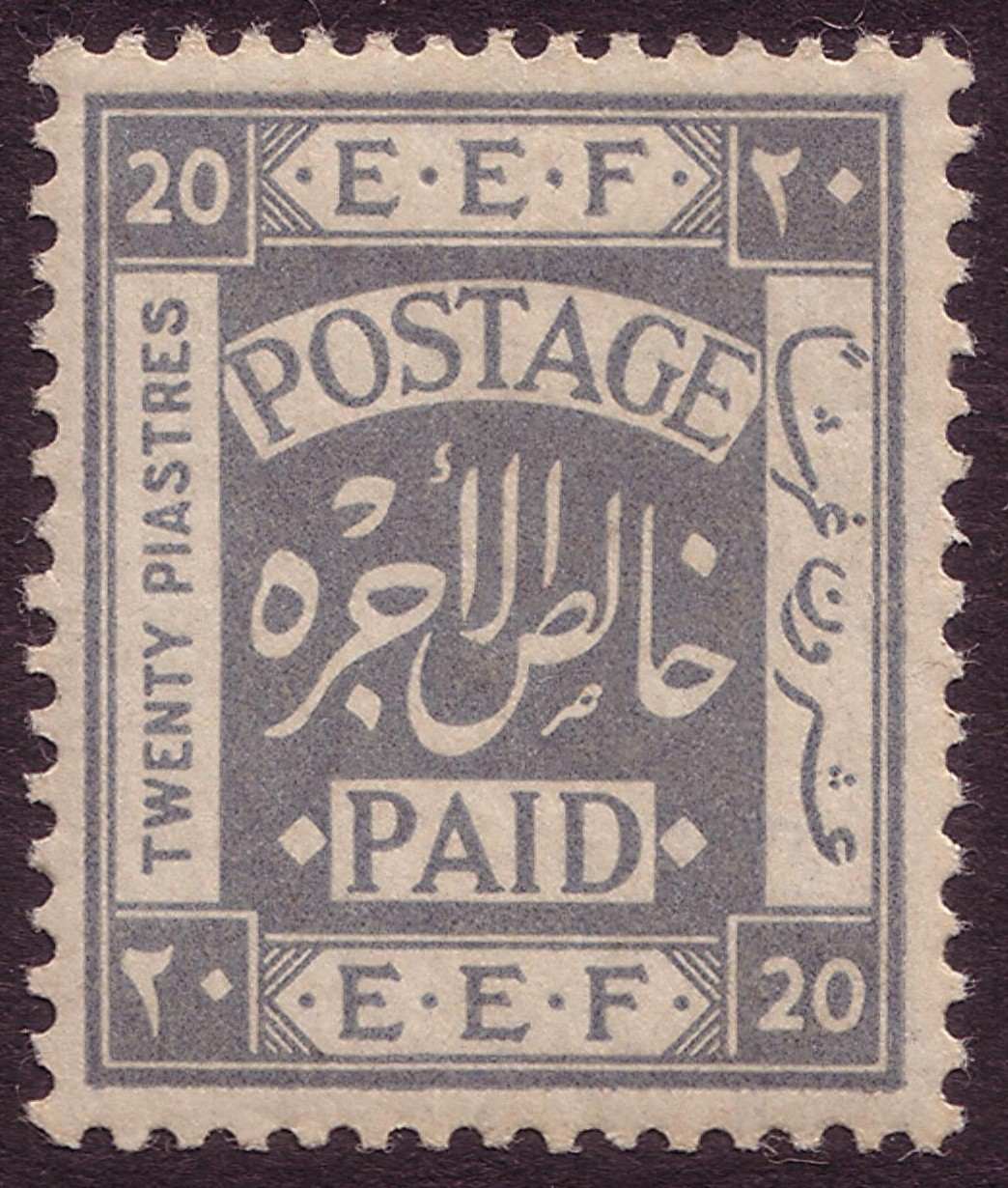
Egyptian Expeditionary Force

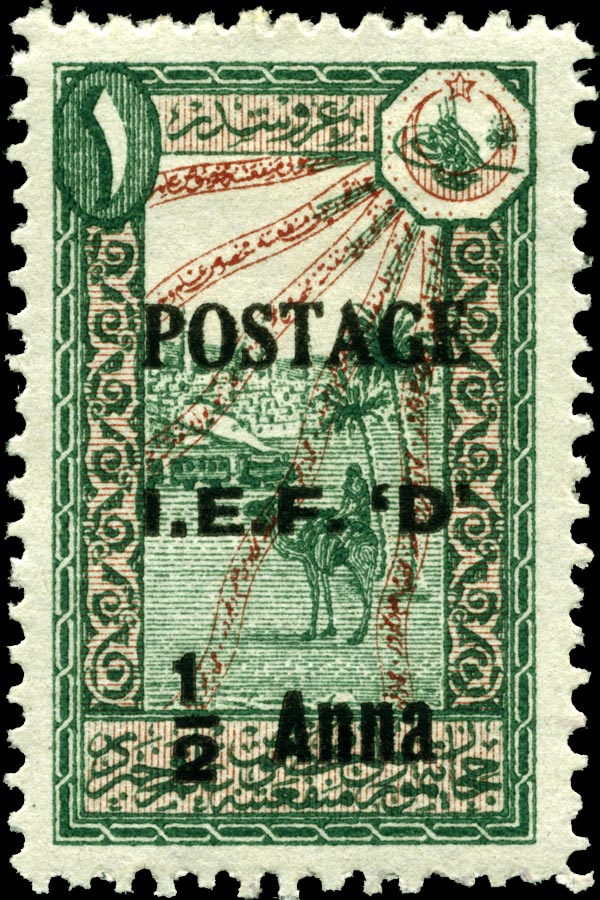
Indian Expeditionary Force D in Mosul

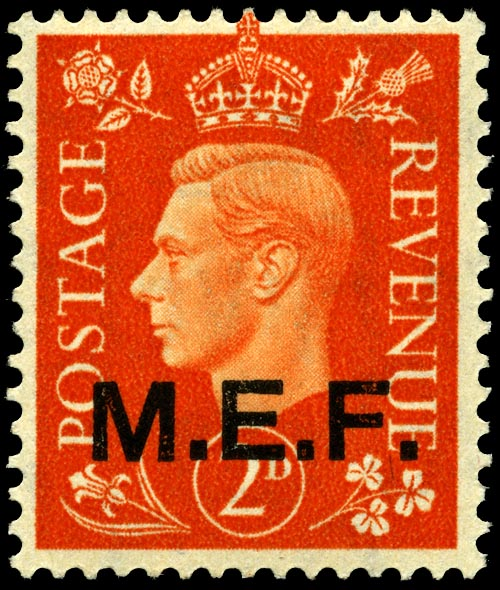
Middle East Forces

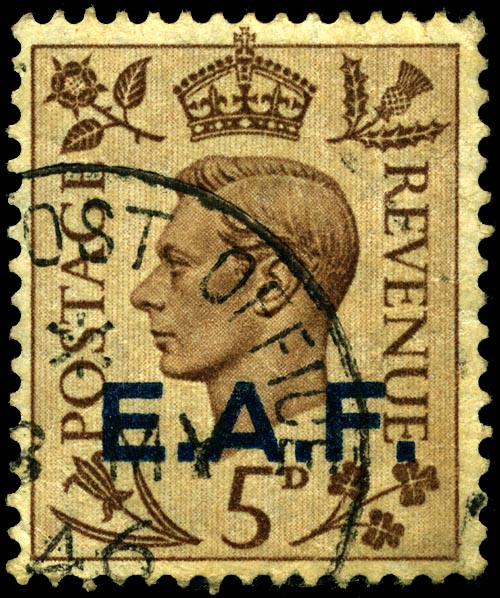
East Africa Forces

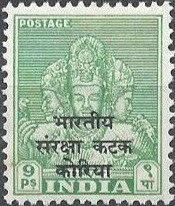
Indian Custodian Forces in Korea

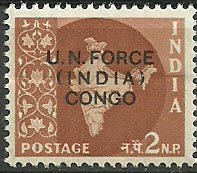
Indian UN Force in Congo

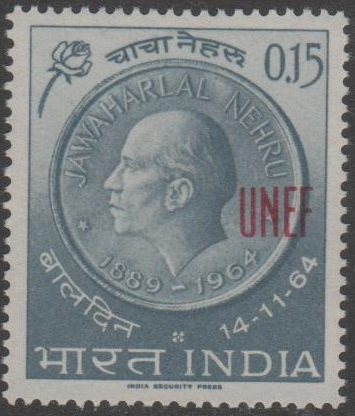
Indian UN Force in Gaza

Military stamps were used in a variety of contexts: exiled government postal services, military expeditions, franchise (free-of-charge) stamps, military postal services, and occupation stamps.
