= West Ukrainian People's Republic =

1918–1919 state in Central Europe

Coordinates: 50°27′N 30°30′E

West Ukrainian People's Republic Західноукраїнська Народна Республіка (Ukrainian)
- 1918–1919
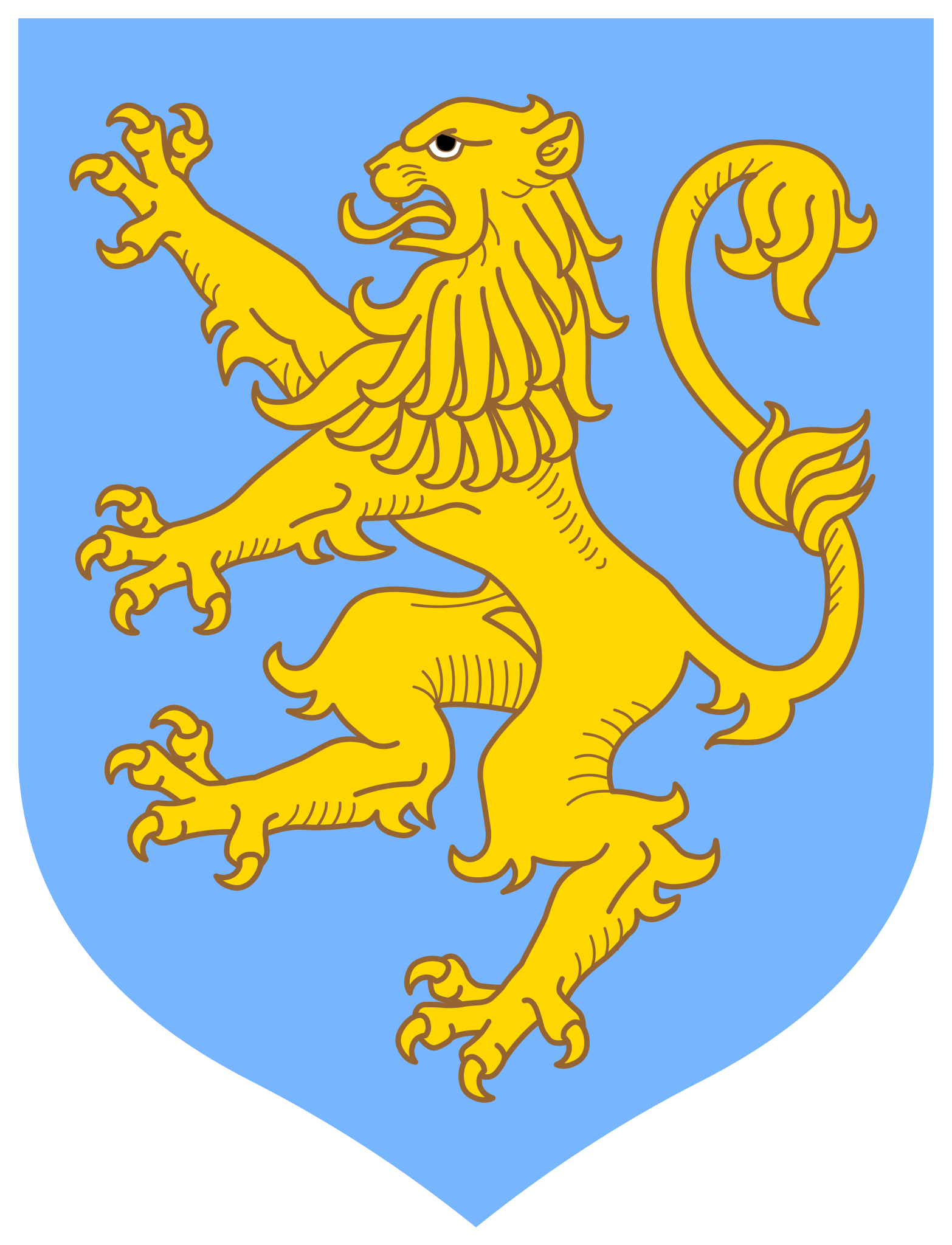
- Flag Coat of arms
- Anthem: Ще не вмерла України; Shche ne vmerla Ukrayiny "Ukraine has not yet perished"
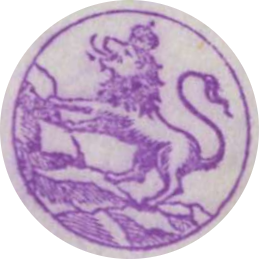
- Seal

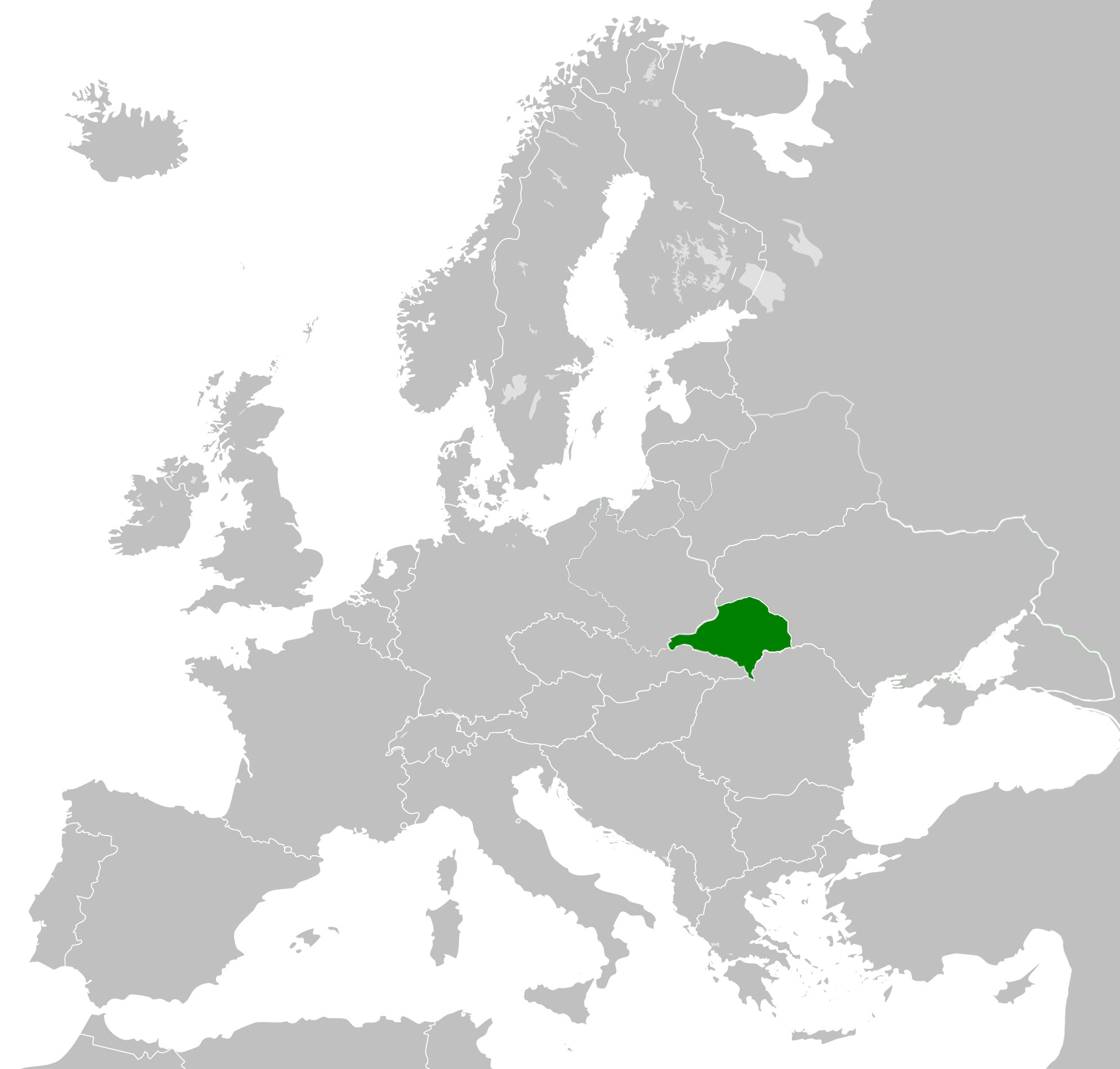
- West Ukrainian People's Republic in 1918
- Status: Partially recognized state (1918–1919, Government in exile from 1919-1923) (Note: It was later a disputed autonomous region of the Ukrainian People's Republic (1919). The Government-in-exile existed from 1919 to 1923).)
- Capital: Lviv; afterwards Ternopil, Stanyslaviv and Zalishchyky
- Common languages: Ukrainian, Polish, Yiddish
- Ethnic groups: Ukrainian; Polish; Jews
- Religion: 58.9% Greek Catholic; 27.8% Latin Catholic; 4% Jewish; 1.3% other
- Government: Provisional parliamentary republic
- Legislature: Ukrainian National Council
- History
  - Established: 1 November 1918
  - Unification Act: 22 January 1919
  - Exile: 16 July 1919
  - Government-in-exile dissolved: 15 March 1923
- Currency: Krone
Preceded by
Austria-Hungary
Kingdom of Galicia and Lodomeria
Succeeded by
Ukrainian People's Republic
Second Polish Republic
First Czechoslovak Republic
Kingdom of Romania
- Today part of: Ukraine, Poland, Slovakia, Romania

The West Ukrainian People's Republic (Ukrainian: Західноукраїнська Народна Республіка (ЗУНР), romanized: Zakhidnoukrayinska Narodna Respublika [ZUNR]; see other names) or simply West Ukraine, was a short-lived state that controlled most of Eastern Galicia from November 1918 to July 1919. It claimed and partially included the major cities of Lviv, Ternopil, Kolomyia, Drohobych, Boryslav, Stanyslaviv and right-bank Peremyshl. Apart from the lands of Eastern Galicia, it also claimed the northern part of Bukovina and Carpathian Ruthenia. Politically, the Ukrainian National Democratic Party (the precursor of the interwar Ukrainian National Democratic Alliance) dominated the legislative assembly, guided by varying degrees of Greek Catholic, liberal and socialist ideology. Other parties represented included the Ukrainian Radical Party and the Christian Social Party.

The ZUNR emerged as a breakaway state amid the dissolution of Austria-Hungary, and in January 1919 nominally united with the Ukrainian People's Republic (UPR) as its autonomous Western Oblast. Poland had also claimed this territory, and by July occupied most of it and forced the West Ukrainian government into exile. When the UPR decided late the same year that it would trade the territory for an alliance with Poland against Soviet Russia, the exiled West Ukrainian government broke with the UPR. The exiled government continued its claim until it dissolved in 1923.

The coat of arms of the ZUNR was azure, a golden lion rampant. The colours of the flag were blue and yellow, with the blue in a much lighter shade than in the contemporary Ukrainian flag.

== Name ==
Until November 13, 1918, the state was officially known as the Ukrainian State. After the Unification Act on January 22, 1919, the state became a part of the unified Ukrainian People's Republic and simultaneously became an autonomous region, known as the Western Oblast of the Ukrainian People's Republic.

The name of the West Ukrainian People's Republic is often abbreviated as ZUNR (as a direct translation of the Ukrainian abbreviation — ЗУНР). Sometimes it can also be abbreviated as WUPR (from West Ukrainian People's Republic) or WUNR (from West Ukrainian National Republic).

== History ==
=== Background ===
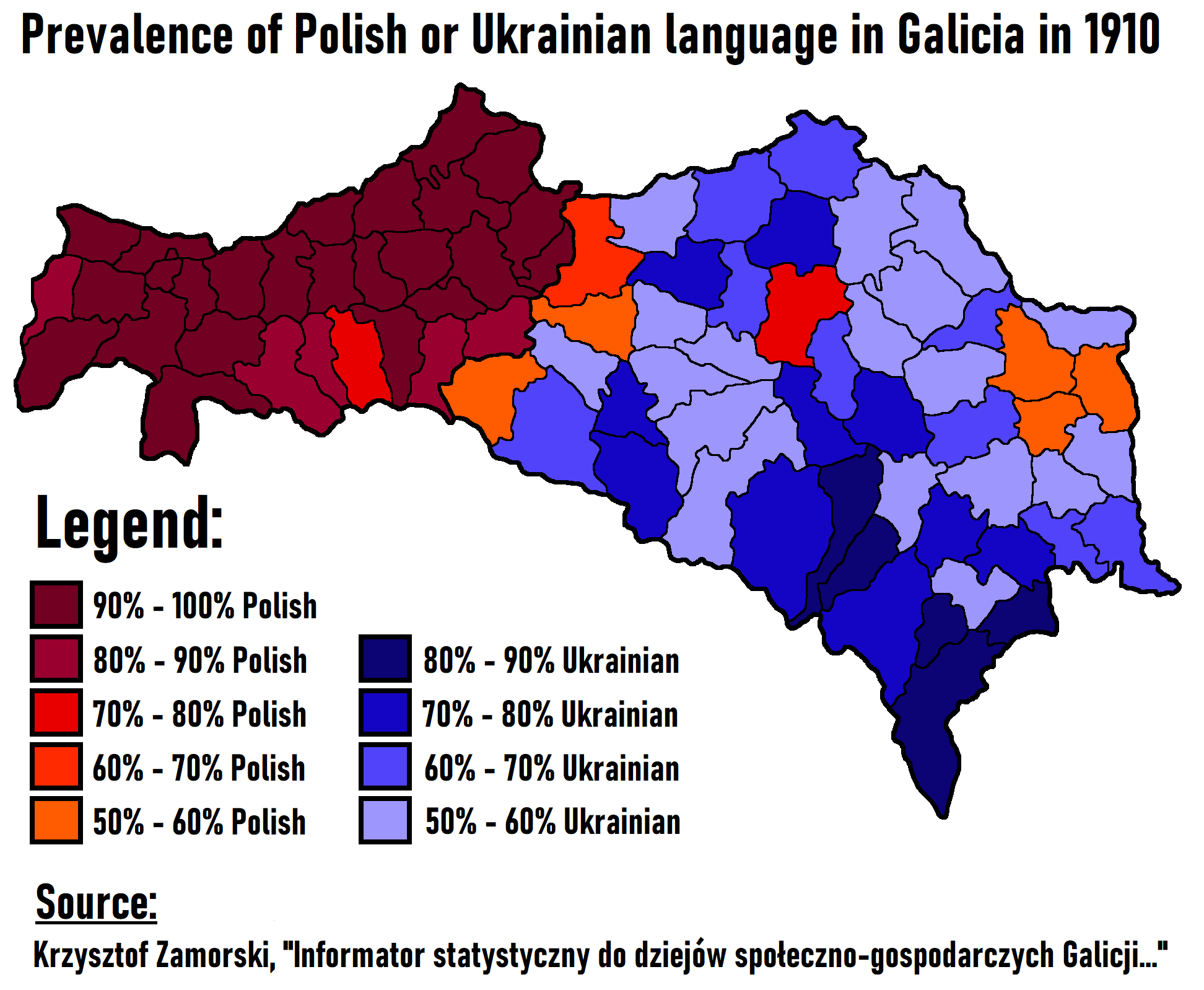
Language map of Galicia according to the 1910 Austro-Hungarian census. Eastern Galicia was a predominantly Ukrainian-speaking region.

According to the Austro-Hungarian census of 1910, the territory claimed by the West Ukrainian People's Republic had about 5.4 million people. Of these, 3,291,000 (approximately 60%) were Ukrainians, 1,351,000 (approximately 25%) were Poles, 660,000 (approximately 12%) were Jews, and the rest included Rusyns, Germans, Hungarians, Romanians, Czechs, Slovaks, Romani, Armenians and others. The cities and towns of this largely rural region were mostly populated by Poles and Jews, while the Ukrainians dominated the countryside. Out of this region's 44 territorial divisions, Poles were a majority in only one — Lviv county. This would prove problematic for the Ukrainians, because largest city and proclaimed capital Lviv had 49.4% Polish population compared to 19.9% Ukrainian population; and was considered by Poland to be one of its most important cities.

The oil reserves near Lviv at Drohobych and Boryslav in the upper Dniester River were among the largest in Europe. Rail connections to Russian-ruled Ukraine or Romania were few; these included Brody on a line from Lviv to the upper Styr River, Pidvolochysk on a line from Ternopil to Proskuriv in Podolia, and a line along the Prut from Kolomyia to Chernivtsi in Bukovina.

=== Independence and struggle for existence ===
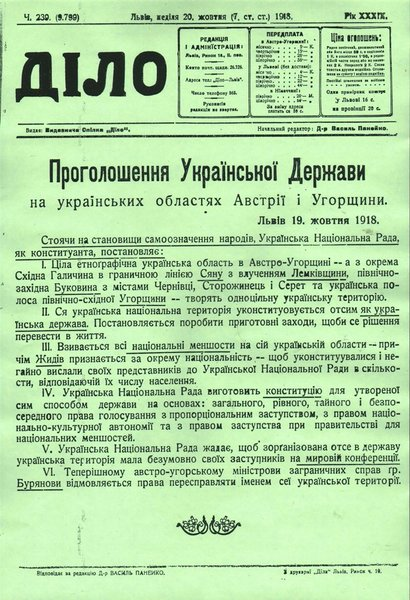
Proclamation of the Ukrainian State. Manifesto of the Ukrainian National Rada of October 19, 1918 in the newspaper «Dilo» for October 20, 1918

The West Ukrainian People's Republic was proclaimed on 1 November 1918. The Ukrainian National Rada (a council consisting of all Ukrainian representatives from both houses of the Austrian parliament and from the provincial diets in Galicia and Bukovina) planned to declare the West Ukrainian People's Republic on 3 November 1918, but moved the date forward to 1 November due to reports that the Polish Liquidation Committee was to transfer from Kraków to Lviv. Shortly after the republic proclaimed independence from the Austro-Hungarian Empire a popular uprising took place in Lviv, where half of the residents were Polish and did not want to be part of a non-Polish state. A few weeks later Lviv's rebellious Poles received support from Poland. On 9 November, Polish forces attempted to seize the Drohobych oil fields by surprise but were driven back, outnumbered by the Ukrainians. The resulting stalemate saw the Poles retaining control over Lviv and a narrow strip of land around a railway linking the city to Poland, while the rest of eastern Galicia remained under the control of the West Ukrainian National Republic.

The Polish population was hostile to the newly formed West Ukrainian state. They considered it a rule "by bayonet, cudgel, and axe". Polish officials resigned en masse, which undermined the Republic's ability to lead an effective administration. Poles dominated the urban areas and started an uprising against the Ukrainian rule not only in Lviv, but also in Drohobych, Peremyshl, Sambir and Yaroslav. This made the West Ukrainian government unable to exert control over the western half of its territory, and made the Polish offensive possible.

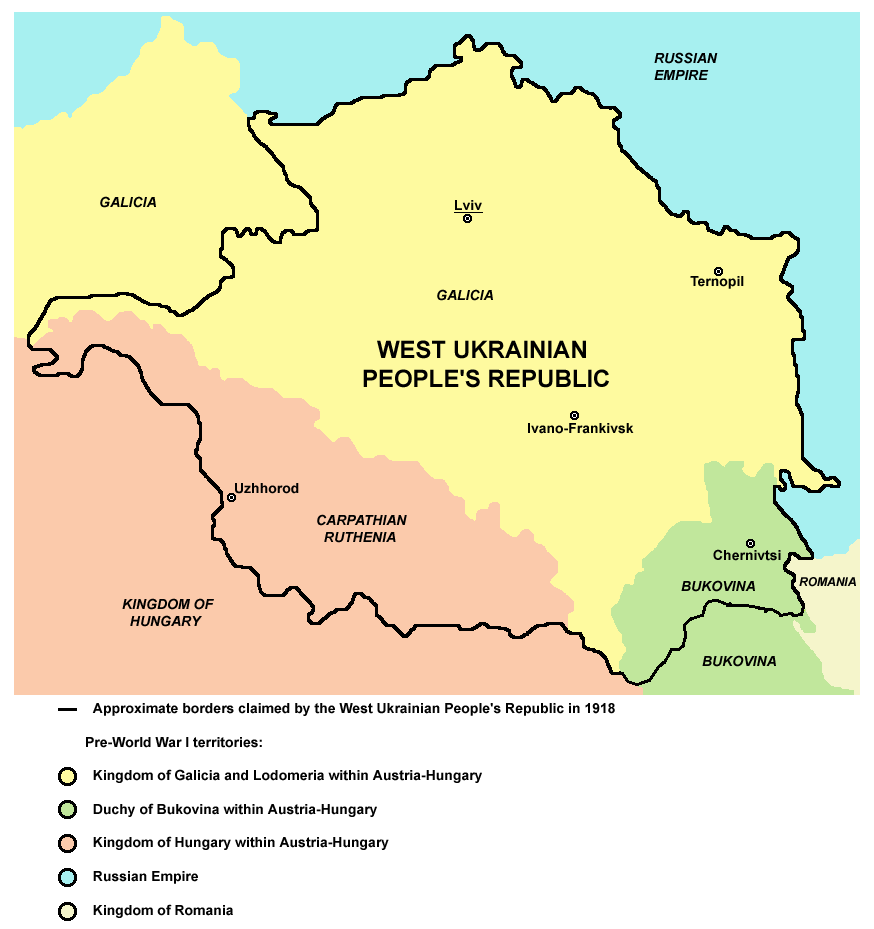
West Ukraine possible claims

Two smaller states west of the West Ukrainian People's Republic also declared independence as result of the dissolution of the Austro-Hungarian Empire. The Komańcza Republic, an association of 30 Lemko villages based around Komańcza in eastern Lemko Region, existed between 4 November 1918 and 23 January 1919. Being pro-Ukrainian it planned to unite with the West Ukrainian People's Republic, but was suppressed by the Polish government. On 5 December 1918, the Lemko-Rusyn Republic, centred around the village of Florynka, declared independence. Western Ukrainian Russophiles sentiment prevailed among its inhabitants, who were opposed to a union with the West Ukrainian People's Republic and instead sought unification with Russia.

An agreement to unite western Ukraine with the rest of Ukraine was made as early as 1 December 1918. The government of the West Ukrainian People's Republic officially united with the Ukrainian People's Republic on 22 January 1919, after which the former was known as the Western Oblast of the Ukrainian People's Republic. This was mostly a symbolic act, however. During the Polish–Ukrainian War, the West Ukrainian army was able to hold off Poland for approximately nine months, but by July 1919, Polish forces had taken over most of the territory claimed by the Western Oblast.

Since western Ukraine had a different tradition in its legal, social and political norms, it was to be autonomous within a united Ukraine. Furthermore, western Ukrainians retained their own Ukrainian Galician Army and government structure. Despite the formal union, the Western Ukrainian Republic and the Ukrainian People's Republic fought in separate wars. The former was preoccupied with a conflict with Poland, while the latter struggled with Soviet and Russian forces.

Relations between the western Ukrainian polity and the Kyiv-based Ukrainian People's Republic were at times strained. The leadership of the former tended to be more conservative in orientation. Well-versed in the culture of the Austrian parliamentary system and an orderly approach to government, they looked upon the socialist revolutionary attitude of their Kyiv-based peers with some dismay and with the concern that the social unrest in the East would spread to Galicia. Likewise, the West Ukrainian troops were more disciplined while those of Kyiv's Ukrainian People's Army were more chaotic and prone to committing pogroms, something actively opposed by the western Ukrainians. The poor discipline in Kyiv's army and the insubordination of its officers shocked the Galician delegates sent to Kyiv.

The national movement in western Ukraine was as strong as in other eastern European countries, and the Ukrainian government was able to mobilize over 100,000 men, 40,000 of whom were battle-ready. Despite the strength of the Ukrainian nationalist forces, they received little support and enthusiasm from the local Ukrainian population; in general, the attitude was often that of indifference, and the male Ukrainian population often tried to avoid service in its military.

=== Exile and diplomacy ===
Part of the defeated army (Mountain Brigade of UGA) found refuge in Czechoslovakia and became known there under the name Ukrajinská brigáda (Czech). On 16 July 1919, the remaining army consisting of about 50,000 soldiers, crossed into the territory of the Ukrainian People's Republic and continued the struggle for Ukrainian independence there.

The same month, the Western Oblast established a government-in-exile in the city of Kamianets-Podilskyi. Relations between the exiled West Ukrainian government and the Kyiv-based government continued to deteriorate, in part because the Western Ukrainians saw the Poles as the main enemy (with the Russians a potential ally) while Symon Petliura in Kyiv considered the Poles a potential ally against his Russian enemies. In response to the Kyiv government's diplomatic talks with Poland, the Western Ukrainian government sent a delegation to the Soviet 12th Army, but ultimately rejected Soviet conditions for an alliance. In August 1919, Kost Levytsky, head of the Western Ukrainian state secretariat, proposed an alliance with Anton Denikin's White Russians which would involve guaranteed autonomy within a Russian state. Western Ukrainian diplomats in Paris sought contact with Russian counterparts in that city. The Russian Whites had mixed views of this proposed alliance. On the one hand, they were wary of the Galicians' Russophobia and concerned about the effect of such an alliance on their relationship with Poland. On the other hand, the Russians respected the discipline and training of the Galician soldiers and understood that an agreement with the Western Ukrainians would deprive Kyiv's Ukrainian People's Army, at war with the Russian Whites, of its best soldiers. In November 1919 the Ukrainian Galician Army, without authorization from their government, signed a ceasefire with the White Russians and placed their army under White Russian authority.

In talks with Kyiv's Directorate government, Western Ukrainian president Petrushevych argued that the Whites would be defeated anyway but that the alliance with them would strengthen relations with the Western powers, who supported the Whites and would help the Ukrainian military forces for their later struggle against the victorious Soviets. Such arguments were condemned by Petliura. As a result, Petrushevych recognized that the West Ukrainian government could no longer work with Petliura's Directorate and on 15 November the West Ukrainian government left for exile in Vienna. The Directorate informed Poland on 2 December that it had no interest in western Ukraine. The West Ukrainian government-in-exile then "rejected the joint institutions" with the Directorate and on 20 December unilaterally repealed the Unification Act. The exiled government resumed the name West Ukrainian People's Republic at the beginning of 1920.

==== Barthelemy Line ====
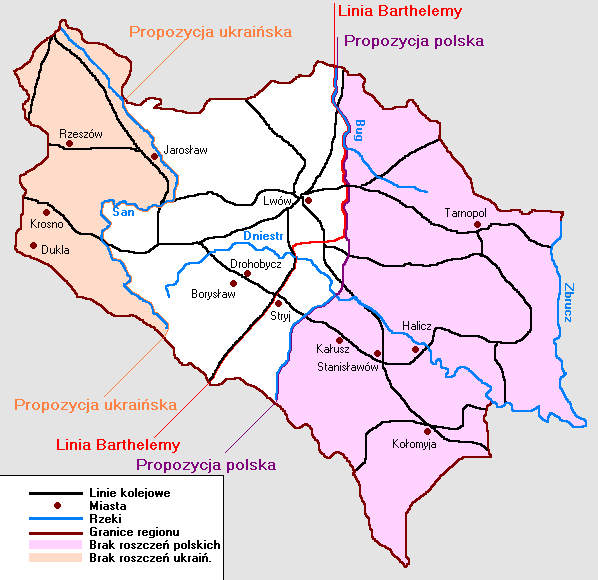
Map of Eastern Galicia with the partition proposals from January and February 1919 No Ukrainian claims Disputed area No Polish claims

In at attempt to stop the Polish-Ukrainian War, a French general Marie Joseph Barthélemy proposed a demarcation line, known as the Barthelemy Line, that was supposed to cease the fighting between the Polish and West Ukrainian army.

In 1918, the Entente countries sought to form a common anti-Bolshevik front, which was to include the Polish, White Russian, Romanian and Ukrainian armies. The outbreak of Polish-Ukrainian hostilities in Lviv on 1 November thwarted these plans, so the Entente states began to press both the Poles and Galicians to seek a settlement and adopt the demarcation line proposed by the allied states.

On 19 January 1919, by the order of General Franchet d'Esperey, a peacekeeping mission under the command of General Joseph Barthelemy arrived in Kraków. Initially, the mission familiarised itself with the Polish position, which opted for the Bug-Świca line. It then travelled to Lviv, meeting with the Ukrainian delegation. The Ukrainians opted for the San line as a future demarcation line.

In this situation, General Barthelemy presented his compromise proposal on 28 January 1919. The armistice line was to run along the Bug River to Kamionka Strumiłłowa, then along the border of the districts to Bóbrka, then along the Bóbrka-Wybranka railway line, westwards to Mikołajów (leaving Mikołajów itself on the Ukrainian side), then along the railway line Lviv-Stryi to the border of the disputed territory in the Eastern Carpathians. The Stryi-Lavochne railway line was to remain in Ukrainian hands. This was to be a temporary line, until the matter was settled by the Paris Peace Conference.

The Polish side accepted this solution, but the Ukrainian delegation insisted on the 'San line'. As a result of the Ukrainian disapproval, the Entente delegation made another attempt at mediation. This was carried out by the Inter-allied Commission for Poland subcommittee set up on 15 February 1919 and headed by Joseph Noulens. The sub-commission consisted of General Joseph Barthelemy (France) as chairman, Colonel Adrian Carton de Wiart (UK), Dr Robert Howard Lord (United States) and Major Giovanni Stabile (Italy). Howard's proposal was not supported by a majority of the Commission. The subcommittee presented a draft truce convention on 15 February 1919. The truce, along the Barthelemy Line, was to be purely military and not affect the decisions of the Paris Peace Conference in any way. An integral part of the convention was to be a supplementary treaty concerning the Boryslav-Drohobychian Oil Basin. It was to remain on the Polish side of the truce line under the management of an international commission, with 50% of oil production to be transferred to the Ukrainian side. Poland and ZUNR were only to be able to record the volume of production and pay for oil supplies. The project secured Entente interests in the oil basin and was the first step towards its neutralisation. At the time of the proposal, the territory of the basin was under the control of the Ukrainian Galician Army. For the West Ukrainian government, the terms of the Armistice Convention were unfavourable; however, they offered a chance to compromise with Poland and obtain international recognition of the Ukrainian state by the Entente.

The commission succeeded in getting the armistice treaty signed on 24 February 1919, and presented its proposals to the parties on 28 February, which was rejected by the West Ukrainian side. As a result of the failure to agree on the demarcation line, Polish-Ukrainian hostilities resumed on 2 March.

==== Treaty of Warsaw (1920) ====
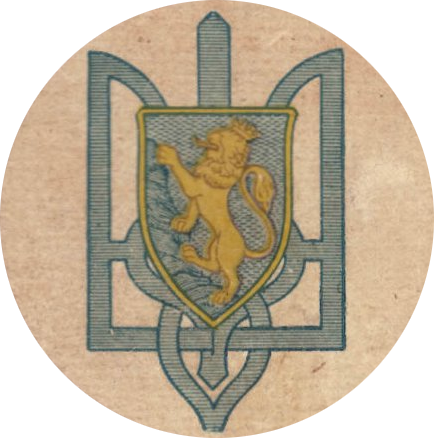
Coat of arm WUPR, used by the WUPR government in exile

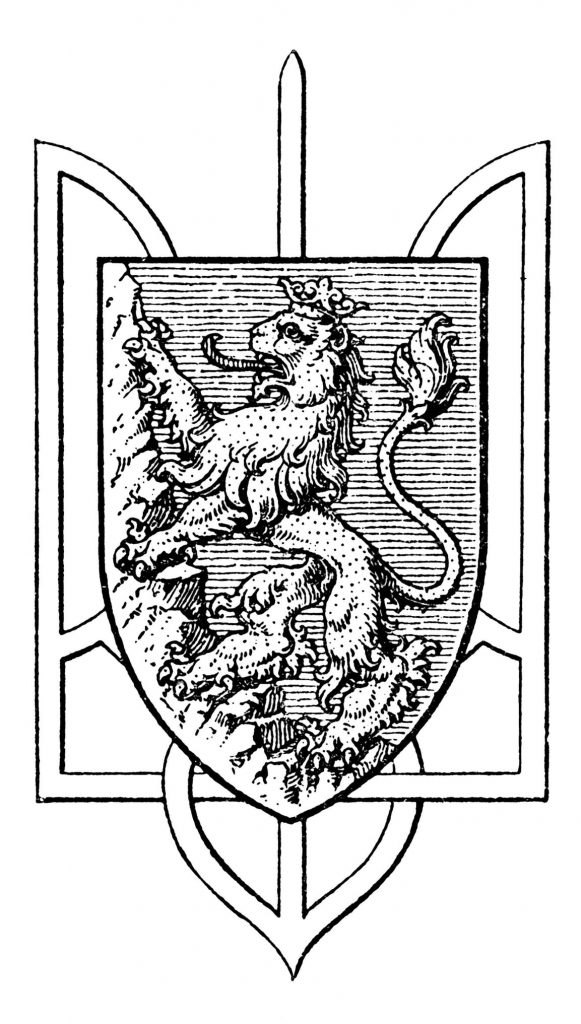
Interpretation of the coat of arms of the WUPR from the diplomatic passport of Yevhen Petrushevych, issued by the Consulate in Bratislava in 1923.

In April 1920, Józef Piłsudski and Symon Petliura agreed in the Treaty of Warsaw to a border on the river Zbruch, officially recognizing Polish control over the disputed territory of Eastern Galicia. In exchange for agreeing to a border along the Zbruch River, recognizing the recent Polish territorial gains in western Ukraine, as well as the western portions of Volhynian Governorate, Kholm Governorate, and other territories (Article II), Poland recognized the Ukrainian People's Republic as an independent state (Article I) with borders as defined by Articles II and III and under otaman Petliura's leadership.

Neither the Polish government in Warsaw nor the exiled Western Ukrainian government agreed to this treaty.

==== Autonomous status ====
The Western Ukrainians continued pressing their interests during the negotiations following World War I at the Paris Peace Conference. These efforts ultimately resulted in the League of Nations declaring on 23 February 1921 that Galicia lay outside the territory of Poland, that Poland did not have the mandate to establish administrative control in that country, and that Poland was merely the occupying military power of Eastern Galicia, whose fate would be determined by the Council of Ambassadors at the League of Nations.

After a long series of further negotiations, on 14 March 1923 it was decided that eastern Galicia would be incorporated into Poland "taking into consideration that Poland has recognized that in regard to the eastern part of Galicia ethnographic conditions fully deserve its autonomous status." The following day, the government of the West Ukrainian People's Republic disbanded. The Polish government reneged on its promise of autonomy for eastern Galicia.

== Relationship with the Entente ==
The Paris Peace Conference approved the provisional administration of the Second Polish Republic on the territory of Eastern Galicia on 25 June 1919. The Entente states and the bodies appointed by them (Council of Ambassadors, Council of the League of Nations) recognised Eastern Galicia as disputed territory not belonging to the Polish state until 14 March 1923, over which sovereignty was to be exercised by the Entente states under the peace treaty with Austria. The Entente also never recognised the Western Ukrainian People's Republic. With regard to the territory of eastern Galicia, it attempted to introduce a makeshift solution, a long-lasting (25 years) mandate for Poland to administer Galicia, with the territory being granted the status of autonomy. The expiry of the mandate period was to be followed by a plebiscite. The political intention of the Entente states at the time was to preserve the territory of eastern Galicia for White Russia. Poland opposed these ideas, while at the same time pursuing a policy of establishing its own governance on the disputed territory, integrating it into the Polish state.

Following the consolidation of Soviet power in Russia and the restoration of non-Bolshevik Russia becoming unachievable, the Council of Ambassadors recognised the sovereignty of the Second Polish Republic over the territory of Eastern Galicia on 15 March 1923, with the reservation that Poland introduce autonomous status for this territory, a surrogate for which was the Act on Provincial Self-Government of September 1922, stating in its very title the special character of the territory of Eastern Galicia within the Polish state.

Following a decision by the Council of Ambassadors, the West Ukrainian government in exile led by Sydir Holubovych in Vienna dissolved on 15 March 1923, and most of its members returned to Poland, being actively involved in the political and social life of the Ukrainian minority in the Second Polish Republic.

== Government ==
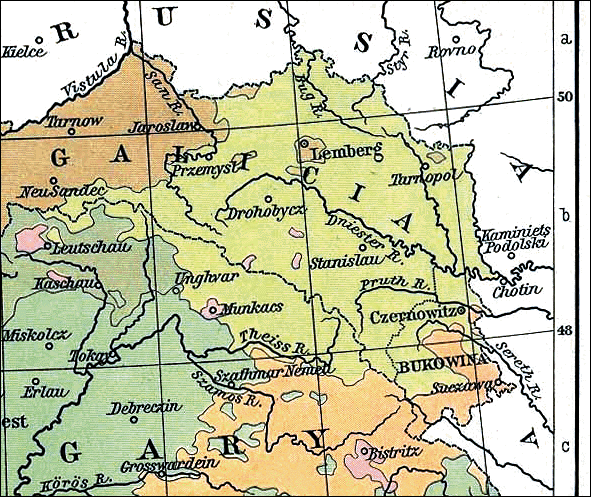
Ruthenian (Rusyn+Ukrainian) inhabited areas of Austria-Hungary in 1911

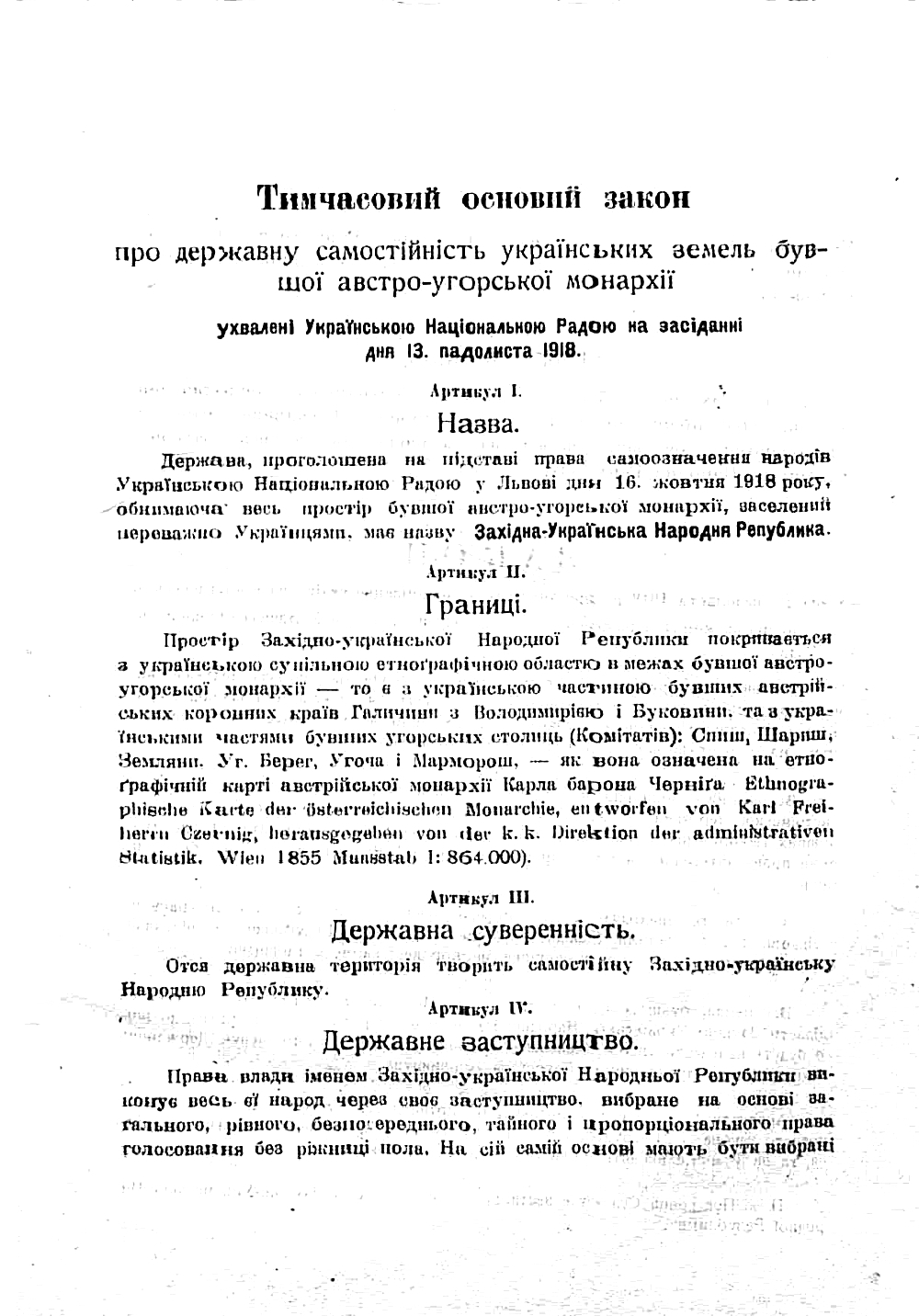
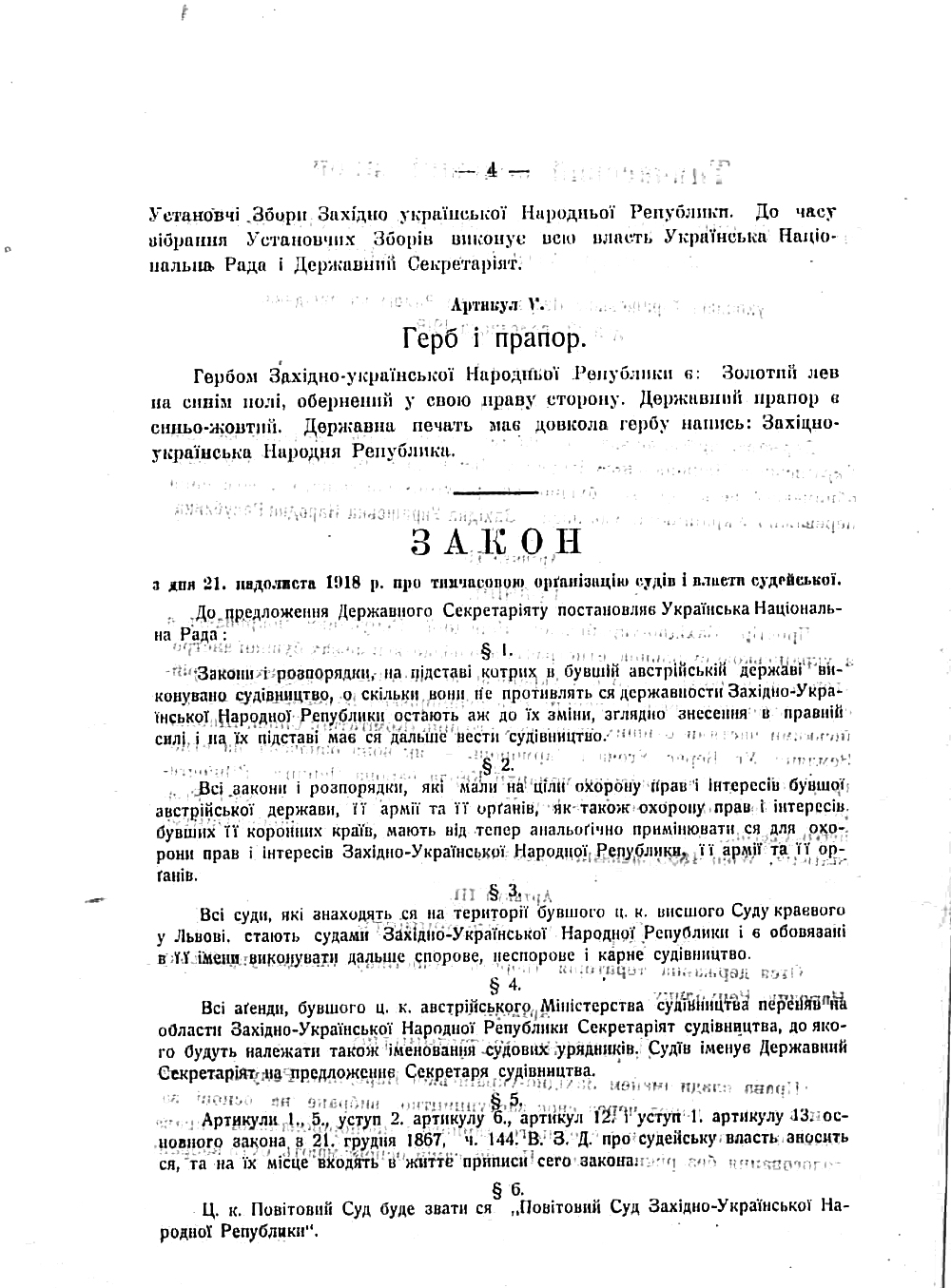
The document «Temporary Basic Law» by Ukrainian National Council

From 22 to 25 November elections took place in Ukrainian-controlled territory for the 150-member Ukrainian National Council that was to serve as the legislative body until the convention of a constituent assembly. Yevhen Petrushevych, the chairman of the Council and a former member of the Austro-Hungarian parliament, automatically became the Republic's president. Subordinated to him was the State Secretariat, whose members included Kost Levytsky (president of the secretariat and the Republic's minister of finance), Dmytro Vitovsky (head of the armed forces), Lonhyn Tsehelsky (secretary of internal affairs), and Oleksander Barvinsky (secretary of education and religious affairs), among others. The country essentially had a two-party political system, dominated by the Ukrainian National Democrats and by its smaller rival, the Ukrainian Radical Party. The ruling National Democrats gave some of their seats to minor parties in order to ensure that the government represented a broad national coalition. In terms of the Ukrainian National Council's social background, 57.1% of its members came from priestly families, 23.8% from peasant households, 4.8% from urban backgrounds, and 2.4% from the petty nobility. In terms of the identified council members' vocational background, approximately 30% were lawyers, 22% were teachers, 14% were farmers, 13% were priests, and 5% were civil servants. Approximately 28% had PhD's, mostly in law.

The West Ukrainian People's Republic governed an area with a population of approximately 4 million people for much of its nine-month existence. Lviv functioned as the Republic's capital from 1 November until the loss of that city to Polish forces on 21 November, followed by Ternopil until late December 1918 and then by Stanyslaviv (present-day Ivano-Frankivsk) until 26 May 1919. Despite the war, the West Ukrainian People's Republic maintained the stability of the pre-war Austrian administration intact, employing Ukrainian and Polish professionals. The boundaries of counties and communities remained the same as they had been during the time of the Austro-Hungarian Empire. The county, regional, and local courts continued to function as they had while the country had been a part of Austria, as did schools, the postal service, telegraphs and railroads. Austrian laws remained temporarily in force. Likewise, the government generally retained the Austrian system of tax collection, although war losses had impoverished the population and the amount of taxes collected was minimal. Most of the government's revenue came from the export of oil and salt.

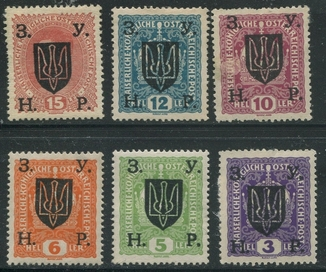
Overprint five-heller stamp (1919)

Of the 100 types of postage stamps issued by the republic, all but two were overprints of existing stamps produced by Austria, Austria-Hungary or Bosnia.

Although ethnic Poles represented only a small minority in the rural areas, they dominated the urban areas and almost 39% of eastern Galician lands had been in the hands of large Polish landowners prior to World War I. The Western Ukrainian People's Republic passed laws that confiscated vast manorial estates from private landlords and distributed this land to landless peasants. Other than in those limited cases, the right to private property was made fundamental and expropriation of lands was forbidden. This differentiated the policies of the West Ukrainian People's Republic from those of the socialistic Kyiv-based Ukrainian government.

The territory of the West Ukrainian People's Republic comprised 12 military districts, whose commanders were responsible for conscripting soldiers. The government was able to mobilize 100,000 soldiers in the spring of 1919, but due to a lack of military supplies, only 40,000 were battle-ready.

In general, the government of the West Ukrainian People's Republic was orderly and well-organized. This contrasted with the chaotic state of the Ukrainian governments that arose on the territory of the former Russian Empire.

=== Policies towards national minorities and inter-ethnic relations ===
Historian Yaroslav Hrytsak stated that the Ukrainian nationalism that developed before the First World War in Austria was anti-Polish, but neither "very xenophobic" nor antisemitic. In November 1918 a decision was made to include cabinet-level state secretaries of Polish, Jewish and German affairs. According to Hrytsak during the entire time of its existence there were no cases of mass repressions against national minorities in territories held by the West Ukrainian People's Republic, Hrytsak states that this differentiated the Ukrainian government from that of Poland. Katarzyna Hibel writes that while officially West Ukrainian People's Republic like Poland declared guarantees of rights of its national minorities, in reality, both countries were violating them and treated other foreign nationalities like fifth column. On 15 February 1919 a law was passed that made Ukrainian the state language. According to this law, however, members of national minorities had the right to communicate with the government in their own languages.

==== Treatment of the Polish population ====
Polish historian Rafał Galuba writes that Polish population was treated as second class citizens by West Ukrainian authorities. On 6 November, a ban on Polish press and publications was issued in Lviv by Ukrainian authorities and printing presses demolished. (Poles had similarly banned Ukrainian publications in territories they controlled). Ukrainian authorities tried to intimidate the Polish population in Lviv by sending soldiers and armed trucks into the streets and dispersed crowds that could turn to Polish demonstrations. Initially, the Ukrainian government refused to take Polish hostages but as both the Polish civilian and military resistance to Ukrainian forces grew, Polish civilians were threatened with summary executions by Ukrainian commander in chief for alleged attacks and shots on Ukrainian soldiers. In response, the Polish side proposed a peaceful solution of the conflict and joint Polish-Ukrainian militia to oversee the public safety in the city.

In Zolochiv, 17 Poles were executed by the Ukrainian authorities. In Briukhovychi, Polish railwaymen who refused to comply with Ukrainian orders to work were executed.

On 29 May 1919, the archbishop Józef Bilczewski sent a message to Ignacy Paderewski attending the Peace Conference in Paris, asking for help and alleging the brutal murders of Polish priests and civilians by the Ukrainians.

Many Poles didn't support the Ukrainian authorities and set up an underground resistance movement that engaged in acts of sabotage. All fieldwork was stopped, the harvest destroyed and machinery purposely broken; Poles also issued to keep up the morale among the population. In response, Ukrainian authorities engaged in terror, including mass executions, court martial and set up detention centers where some Poles were interned. The conditions in these camps involved unheated wooden barracks, lack of bedding and lack of medical care, resulting in high levels of morbidity from typhoid. Estimated casualties at these camps include nearly 900 at a camp in Kosiv, according to various sources from 300 to 600 (dying from typhoid) in Mykulyntsi, 100 in Kolomyia, and 16 to 40 in Berezhany, due to unheated barracks at temperatures of −20 °C. Cases of robbing, beating, torturing or shooting of Polish prisoners were reported.

According to the historian Christopher Mick, the Ukrainian government in general treated the Polish population under its control no worse than the Polish government treated the Ukrainians under its control, writing that Ukrainian authorities didn't treat the Polish population "gently" and that Ukrainian authorities mirrored Polish authorities by making speaking in Polish unwelcome. Mick acknowledges that Ukrainian side during the siege of Lviv stopped caring about supplies reaching the city and attempted to disrupt the city's water supply. Its fierce artillery fire killed many civilians, including women and children.

In a report that he submitted to the Polish Foreign Ministry in early 1920, the Roman Catholic Archbishop of Lviv Józef Bilczewski stated that the anti-Polish violence under Ukrainian governance was widespread and organised by the government, rather than being spontaneous. He headed a rescue committee that provided food to the poorest, and along with the Greek Catholic Metropolitan Andrey Sheptytsky he tried to negotiate a peace between the Polish and Ukrainian populace.

==== Treatment of the Jewish minority ====
Although relations between Poles and the West Ukrainian People's Republic were antagonistic, those between the Republic and its Jewish citizens was generally neutral or positive. Deep-seated rivalries existed between the Jewish and Polish communities, and anti-Semitism, particularly supported by the Polish National Democratic Party, became a feature of Polish national ideology. As a result, many Jews came to consider Polish independence as the least desirable option following the First World War. In contrast to the antagonistic position taken by Polish authorities towards Jews, the Ukrainian government actively supported Jewish cultural and political autonomy as a way of promoting its own legitimacy.

The Western Ukrainian government guaranteed Jewish cultural and national autonomy, provided Jewish communities with self-governing status, and promoted the formation of Jewish national councils which, with the approval of the Western Ukrainian government, established the Central Jewish National Council in December 1918 to represent Jewish interests in relation to the Ukrainian government and to the Western allies. The Council of Ministers of the West Ukrainian National Republic bought Yiddish-language textbooks and visual aids for Jewish schools and provided assistance to Jewish victims of the Polish pogrom in Lviv. The Ukrainian press maintained a friendly attitude towards the West Ukrainian Republic's Jewish citizens. Their Hebrew and Yiddish schools, cultural institutions and publishers were allowed to function without interference.

Reflecting the republic's demographics, approximately one-third of the seats in the national parliament were reserved for the national minorities (Poles, Jews, Slovaks and others). The Poles boycotted the elections, while the Jews, despite declaring their neutrality in the Polish-Ukrainian conflict, participated and were represented by approximately 10 percent of the delegates. Localized anti-Jewish assaults and robberies by Ukrainian peasants and soldiers, while far fewer in number and less brutal than similar actions by Poles, occurred between January and April 1919. The government publicly condemned such actions and intervened in defence of the Jewish community, imprisoning and even executing perpetrators of such crimes. The government also respected Jewish declared neutrality during the Polish-Ukrainian conflict. By the orders of Yevhen Petrushevych it was forbidden to mobilize Jews against their will or to otherwise force them to contribute to the Ukrainian military effort. In an effort to aid Western Ukraine's economy, the Western Ukrainian government granted concessions to Jewish merchants.

The West Ukrainian government's friendly attitude towards Jews was reciprocated by many members of the Jewish community. Although Jewish political organizations officially declared their neutrality in the Polish-Ukrainian struggle, many individual Jews offered their support or sympathized with the West Ukrainian government in its conflict with Poland. Jewish officers of the defunct Austro-Hungarian army joined the West Ukrainian military, and Jewish judges, lawyers, doctors and railroad employees joined the West Ukrainian civil service. From November 1918, ethnic Poles in the civil service who refused to pledge loyalty to the West Ukrainian government either quit en masse or were fired; their positions were filled by large numbers of Jews who were willing to support the Ukrainian state. Jews served as judges and legal consultants in the courts in Ternopil, Stanyslaviv, and Kolomyia. Jews were also able to create their own police units, and in some locations the Ukrainian government gave local Jewish militias responsibility for the maintenance of security and order. In the regions of Sambir and Radekhiv approximately a third of the police force was Jewish. Jews fielded their own battalion in the army of the Western Ukrainian National Republic, and Jewish youths worked as scouts for the West Ukrainian military. Most of the Jews cooperating with and serving in the West Ukrainian military were Zionists. In general, Jews made up the largest group of non-ethnic Ukrainians who participated in all branches of the West Ukrainian government.

The liberal attitude taken towards Jews by the Western Ukrainian government could be attributed to the Habsburg tradition of inter-ethnic tolerance and cooperation leaving its mark on the intelligentsia and military officers of the late nineteenth and early twentieth centuries. The friendly attitude towards Jews that the Galician Ukrainians had was in stark contrast to the Directorate of Ukraine, which enjoyed no sympathy amongst the Jewish population.

=== Administrative divisions ===
Territorial dispute in the former Duchy of Bukovina WUPR part

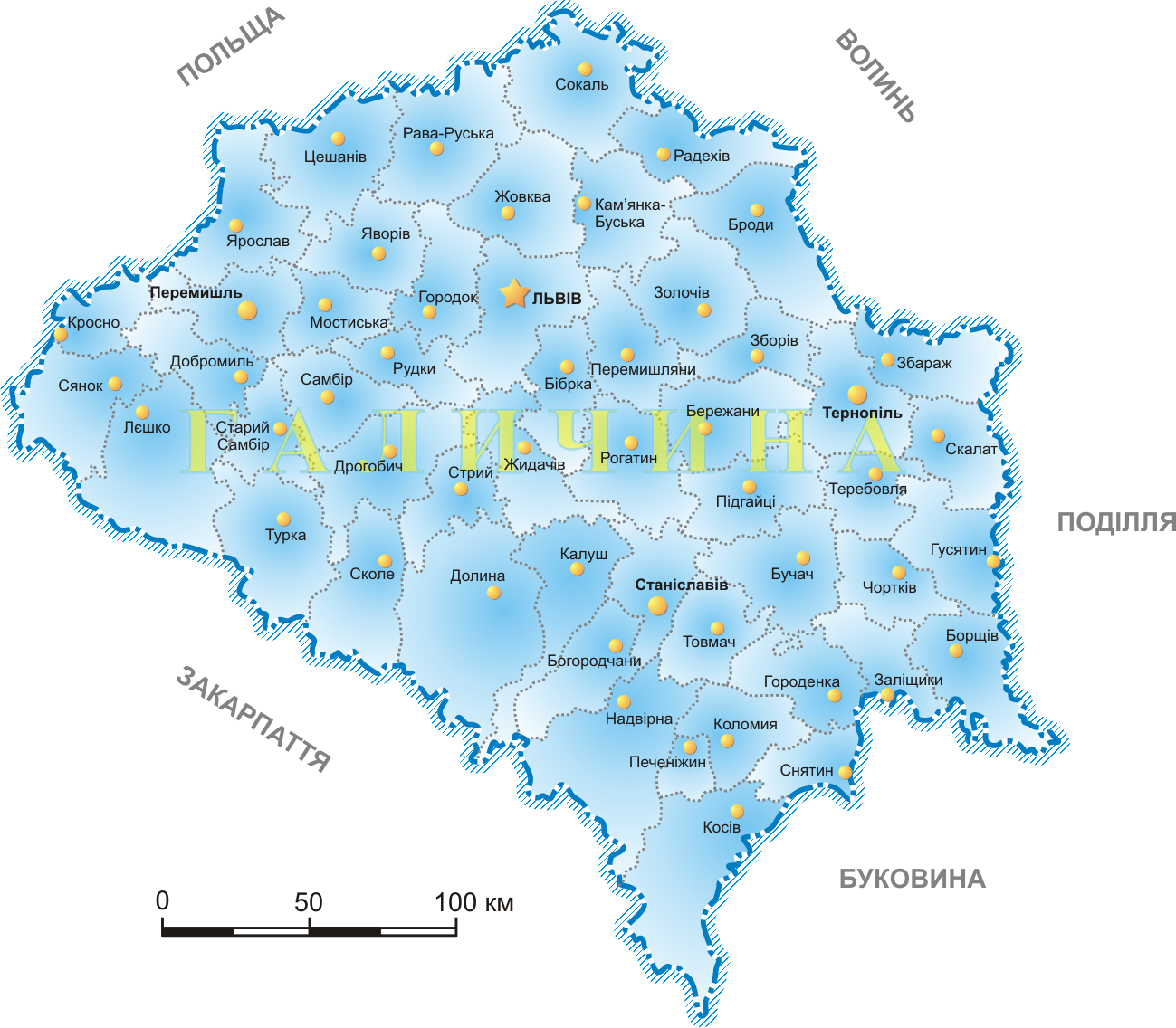
Povits WUPR

After the annexation of Transcarpathia and Bukovina, the WUPR consisted of 40 povits, headed by the State Povit Commissioners. Initially, they were elected by the local communities at the Povit National Councils. Later, this function was transferred to the State Secretariat of Internal Affairs. The Povit Ukrainian National Councils served as advisory bodies to State Povit Commissioners.

State Povit Commissioners had power over effectively all civil organizations and affairs in the povit, except the military, courts, railways, the post, and the telegraph (those functions were performed by special povit and regional commandants). There were povits where the Councils had the decisive vote; those near the frontline did not assemble at all. The State Secretariat developed the «Law on Povit Labour Councils», according to which the new povit government was elected by popular vote and the Commissioners became subordinate to them. This law was never implemented due to the advance of Polish forces.

=== Public policy doctrine ===
Public order was protected by the Gendarmerie, formed in November 1918 with headquarters in Lviv. The first commandant was Lev Indyshevskyi; in February 1919 he was replaced by lieutenant colonel Oleksandr Krasitskyi. Later it came under the direct command of the State Secretariat of the Military affairs. In spring 1919 it had 6 chief sergeants, 25 master sergeants, 1000 gendarmes, 4000 recruits, and 3000 policemen. Ethnic Poles and Germans served side-by-side with Ukrainians. There are were problems due to the lack of professional gendarmes, newly formed units often performed their duties poorly. Many people joined the Gendarmerie in order not to go to the front line.

In Lviv, Husiatyn, Shchyrets, Chortkiv, Stanislav and Ternopil the special Jewish Police Units were active.

=== Military ===
The Ukrainian Galician Army served as the combined military force of the WUPR. Unlike the Ukrainian People's Army of the Ukrainian People's Republic, the UGA managed to create a solid organizational structure. The WUPR was divided into 3 military districts, with headquarters in Lviv, Stanyslaviv (Note: Now known as Ivano-Frankivsk (Ukrainian: Івано-Франківськ); also known as Stanislav) and Ternopil. They were further divided into 12 military counties, which were based in the following cities: Lviv, Przemyśl, Rava-Ruska, Sambir, Stanyslaviv, Stryi, Kolomyia, Chernivtsi, Ternopil, Zolochiv, Chortkiv, Berezhany.

№	Military District	Military counties
1	Lviv	Lviv, Przemyśl, Rava-Ruska, Sambir
2	Stanislav	Stanislav, Kolomyia, Stryi, Chernivtsi
3	Ternopil	Ternopil, Berezhany, Zolochiv, Chortkiv

== Economy ==
=== Currency ===
The republic did not have its own currency, but rather used the Austro-Hungarian crown. After the act of unification with the Ukrainian People's Republic, the banknotes in circulation were overprinted with nominals in the Ukrainian hryvnia.

Along with these official issues, some cities printed their local contingency banknotes (Notgeld) since 1914.

== Gallery ==
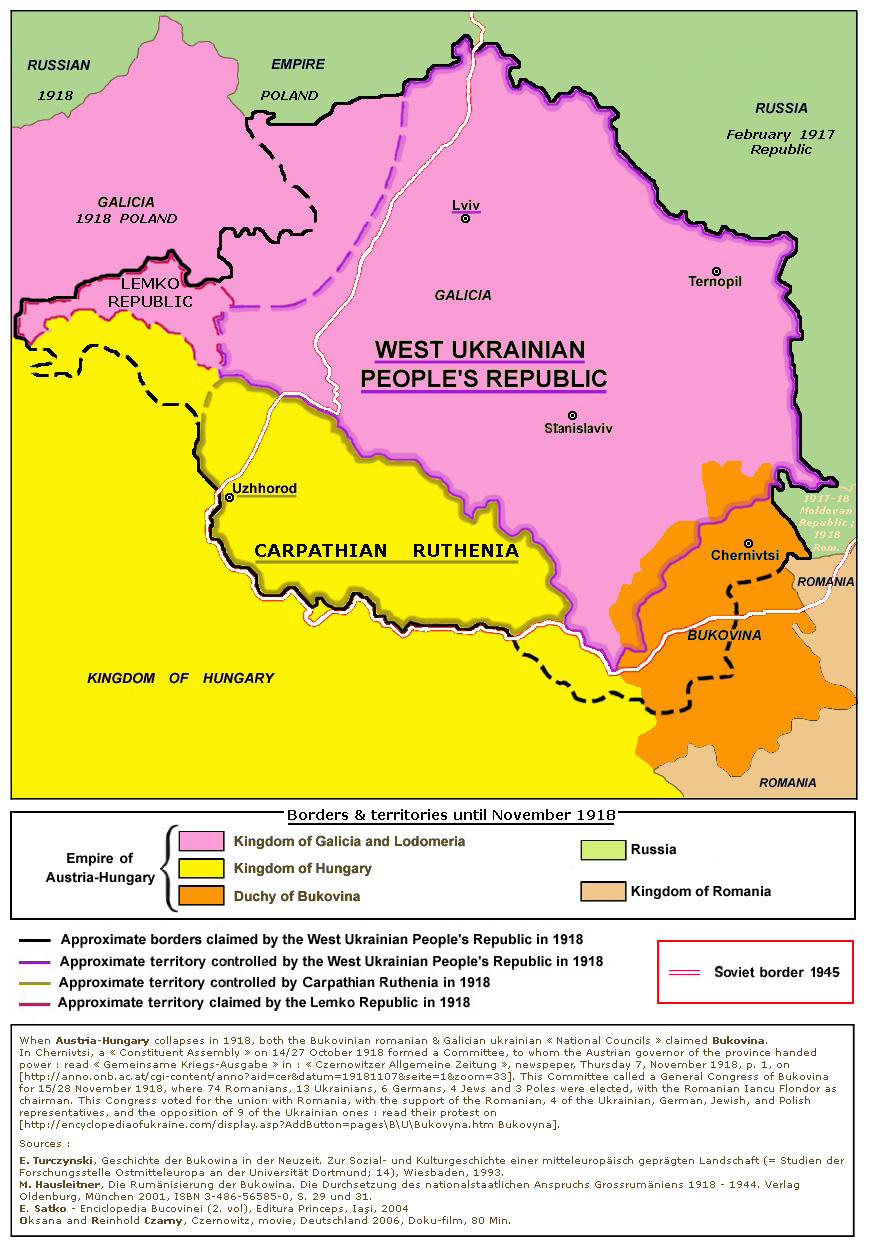
Map of the areas claimed by the West Ukrainian National Republic

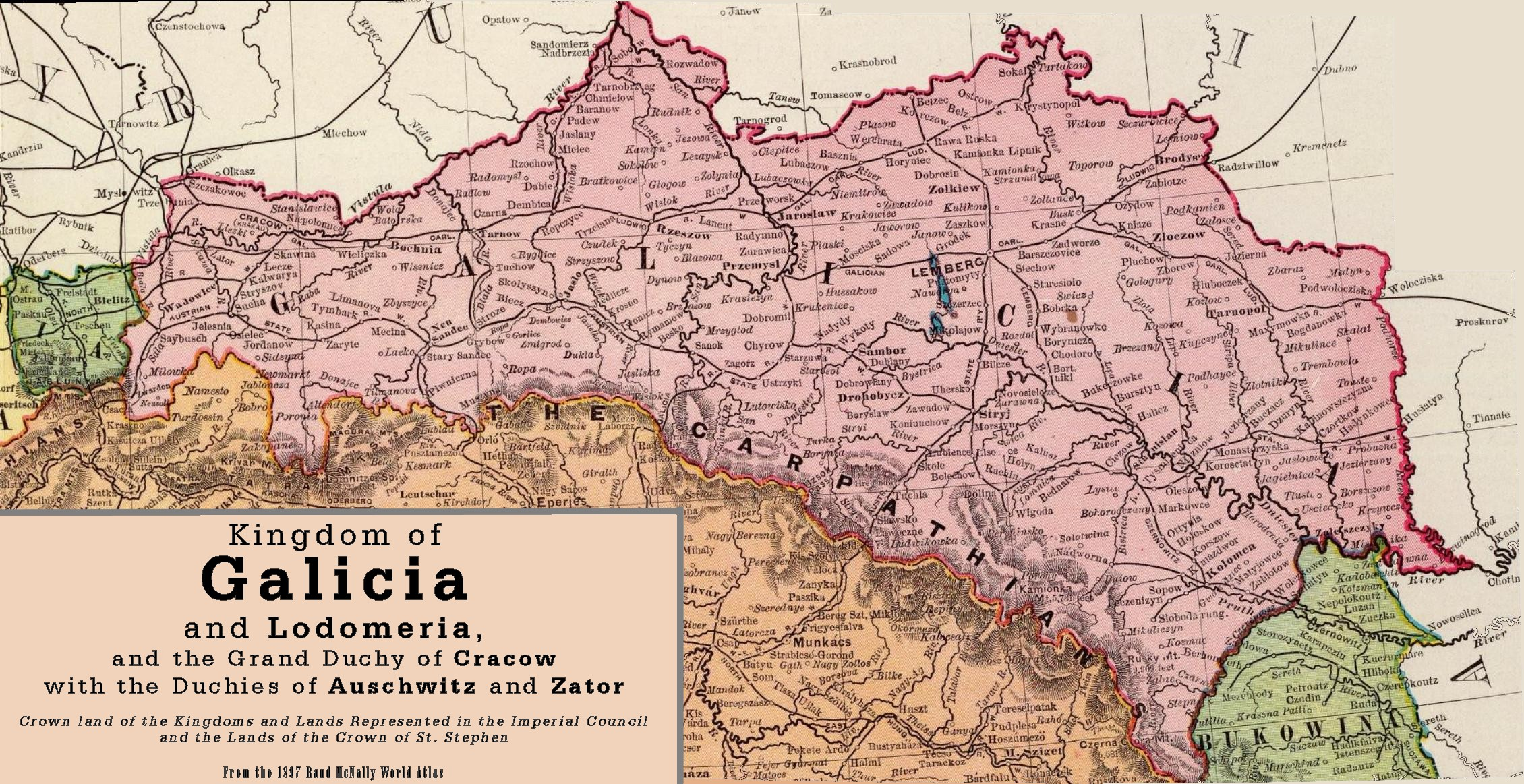
Rail lines of Galicia before 1897

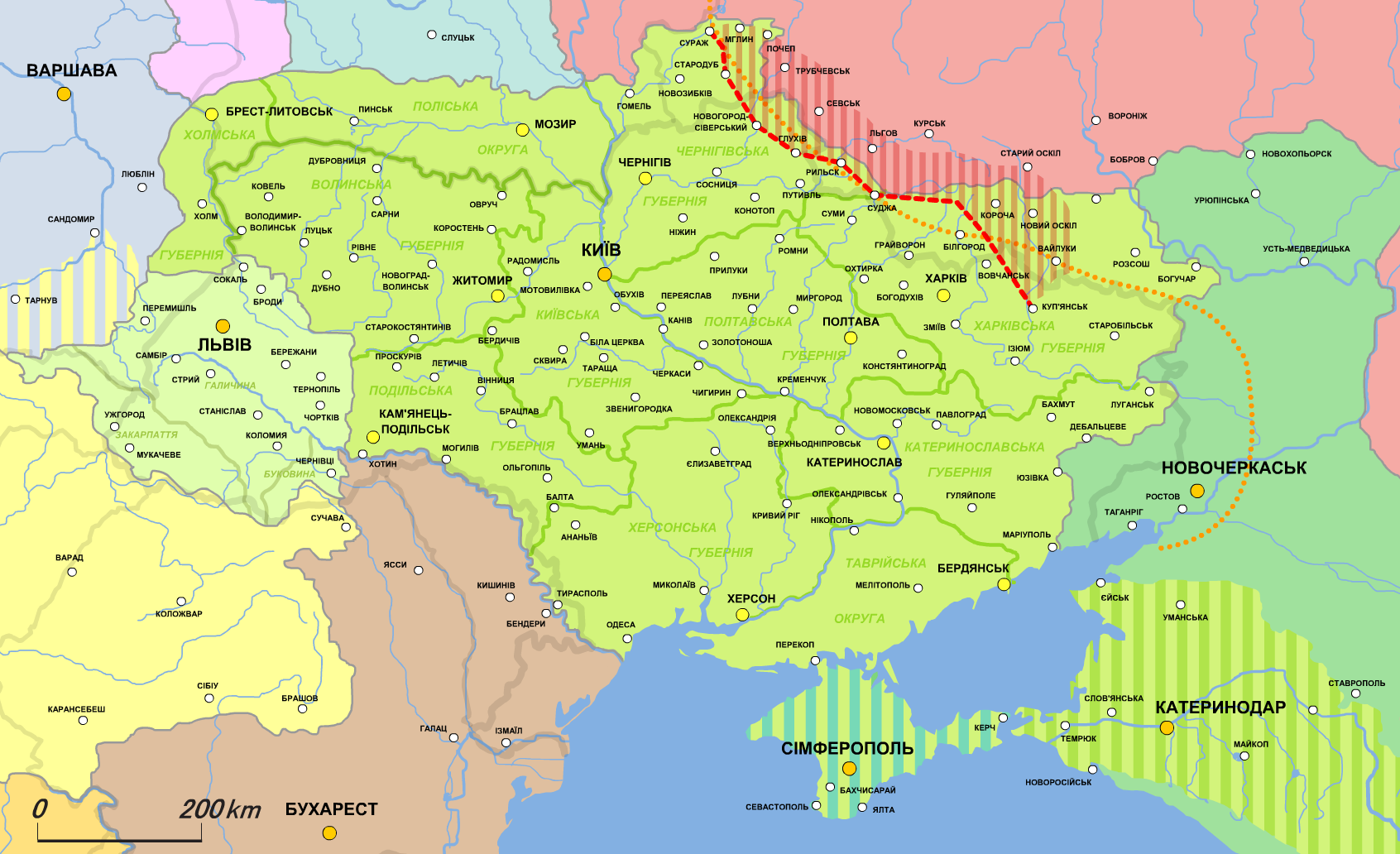
Territorial claims of Ukraine in 1918

The West Ukrainian People's Republic in 1919

== See also ==
- Ukrainian Galician Army or UHA, the military forces of the West Ukrainian People's Republic
- Galician Soviet Socialist Republic, revolutionary government installed by Soviet Russia in 1920
- 1918 Russia–Ukraine negotiations
