= Revenue stamps of Eritrea =

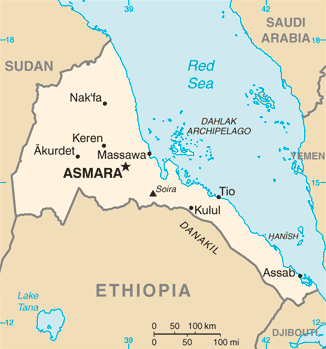
Map of Eritrea

Eritrea first issued revenue stamps under the Italian Eritrea administration. It continued to issue revenues under British and Ethiopian occupation, as well as when it became an independent state. The capital Asmara also issued some revenues.

== Italian colony (until 1941) ==
Eritrea's first revenues were issued when it was still an Italian colony. There were issues for stamp duty (Marca da Bollo), bills of exchange (Marca da Bollo per Cambiali) and passports (Atti Esteri Passaporti), all of which were Italian revenues overprinted ERITREA. Apart from these there were stamps for bills of lading (Tassa Camerale sulle Polizze de Carico), which had designs with the coat of arms of Italy in the centre. These were Italian Eritrea's only revenues which were not overprints on Italy.

In addition, Eritrea also used general revenue issues for use in all Italian colonies, as well as revenue stamps of Italian East Africa.

== British occupation (1943 to 1952) ==
The British occupied Eritrea during World War II and introduced revenues for Eritrea in 1943. The first issue consisted of stamps of the Italian colonies overprinted ERITREAN Inland Revenue and the value in cents or shillings. These were later replaced with similar ones with the overprint reading ERITREA INLAND REVENUE. In 1944, keytypes were issued, with designs similar to the ones used in Italian Somaliland. These continued to be used until the end of the British occupation. There were also some surcharges.

In 1947, the 4c keytype stamp was issued overprinted CYRENAICA P.T. 25 for use in Cyrenaica, which was also under British Military Administration.

== Part of Ethiopia (1952 to 1991) ==
Ethiopian Eritrea's first revenues were British occupation keytype issues overprinted in Ethiopian dollars. These were replaced by a new issue in 1953, again using the keytypes but with the new currency inscribed on the stamp. There was another issue using the keytype in 1955, with the face values shown trilingually in Amharic, English and Arabic. These were replaced by an issue in 1960 portraying Emperor Haile Selassie I.

After this, Ethiopian revenue stamps were probably used in Eritrea.

== Independent (since 1991) ==
Upon becoming independent, Eritrea began to issue revenues once again. The first stamps were issued in 1991 by the Provisional Government of Eritrea, but were soon replaced by a new issue two years later in a similar design but with the inscription changed to reflect the establishment of the State of Eritrea. In 1997 a single stamp showing a fish was issued. This exists in two formats, either perforated or rouletted.

== Asmara (1940 to 1960) ==
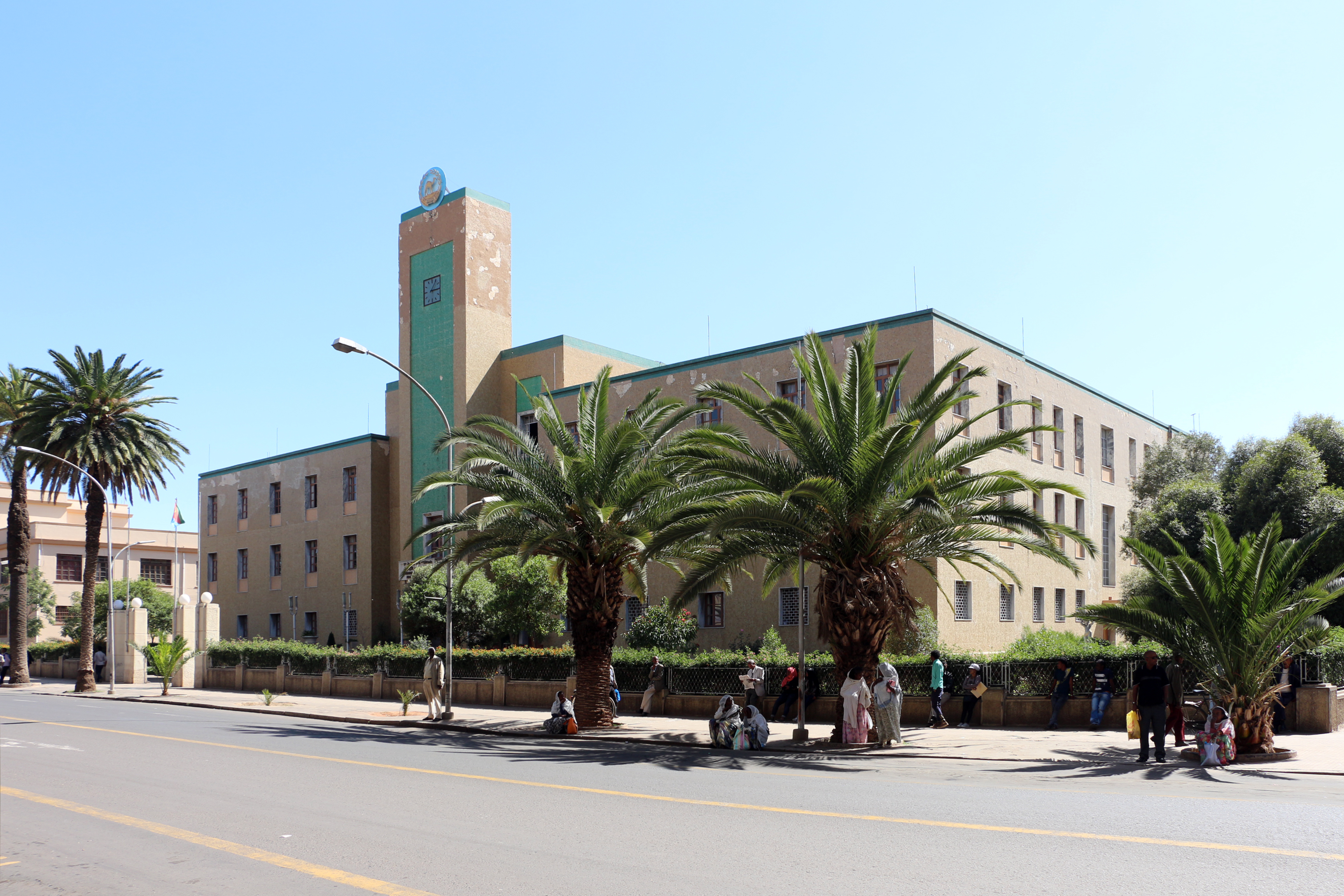
The Asmara City Hall which appeared on the city's last revenue stamps of 1960.

Asmara's first revenues were issued in 1940 showing the city's coat of arms. When it was an Italian colony, two sets were issued, one for health inspection fees (Diritti Sanitari) and the other for secretariat fees (Diritti di Segretaria).

When the British occupied Eritrea, Asmara issued stamps for use as general duty revenues. All were stamps of the Italian colonies overprinted Asmara Municipality Revenue, and the value was in cents or shillings. When Eritrea became part of Ethiopia, Asmara's revenues were still those of the Italian colonies overprinted. However, the overprint was now in Italian, reading Municipio Asmara, and the new values were in Ethiopian dollars.

An additional two stamps were issued for Asmara in 1960. These showed the city hall and were inscribed SEGNATASSE. This usually meant postage due, however they are regarded as revenues since they were only used for fiscal purposes and were never used as postage dues.

== See also ==
- Postage stamps and postal history of Eritrea
