= Oman Post =

Post office of Oman

- Native name: بريد عمان
- Founded: 2005
- Key people: Shaikh Ibrahim bin Sultan Alhosni (Acting CEO)
- Website: https://www.omanpost.om/

Oman Post is the official postal service of Oman.

== History ==
The first post office was opened in Muscat by the British Postal Department in 1856.

Oman Post was established in 2005 by the Royal Decree of His Majesty Sultan Qaboos bin Said.

Oman Post is a member of Universal Postal Union.

== Branches ==
Oman Post has 56 branches and 156 partners across the Sultanate.

== Asyad Express ==
Asyad Express ship packages to over 220 destinations. Along with its express services, it has domestic delivery across the Sultanate of Oman, with services like Cash on Delivery (COD) and customer fulfillment for e-commerce companies.

== Leadership ==
Shaikh Ibrahim bin Sultan Alhosni is currently the acting CEO of Oman Post.

== Ownership ==
Oman Post is an Asyad Group member company.

== Arabian Sea Humpback whale ==
Oman Post recently launched postage stamps featuring an endangered species, the Arabian Sea Humpback whale.

== See also ==
- Postage stamps and postal history of Muscat and Oman
