= British postal agencies in Eastern Arabia =

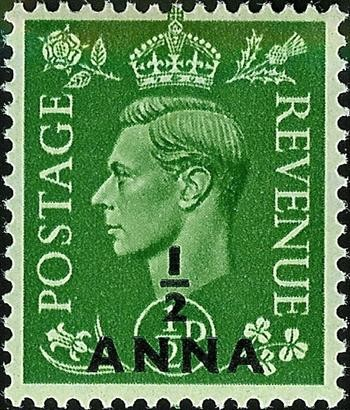
A surcharged British stamp issued in 1948

British postal agencies in Eastern Arabia issued early postage stamps used in each of Abu Dhabi, Bahrain, Dubai, Kuwait, Muscat and Qatar. Muscat and Dubai relied on Indian postal administration until 1 April 1948 when, following the Partition of India, British agencies were established there. Two agencies were opened in Qatar: at Doha (August 1950) and Umm Said (February 1956). In Abu Dhabi, an agency was opened on Das Island in December 1960 and in Abu Dhabi City on 30 March 1963. The agencies also supplied stamps to Bahrain until 1960; and to Kuwait during shortages in 1951–1953.

The agency in Dubai issued the Trucial States stamps on 7 January 1961. As each state took over its own postal administration, the offices closed. Closure dates were: Qatar on 23 May 1963; Dubai on 14 June 1963; Abu Dhabi on 29 March 1964; finally Muscat on 29 April 1966.

== Muscat ==
The first post office to open in the region was at Muscat on 1 May 1864. This was originally under the Bombay circle but it was transferred to the Sind (Karachi) circle in April 1869 and then back to Bombay in 1879. Only one office existed until 1970. Postal control briefly passed to Pakistan after the Partition of India and then to Great Britain. After the British agency closed, the Sultanate of Muscat and Oman assumed postal control from 30 April 1966.

Muscat used Indian stamps from 1 May 1864 until 19 December 1947. Stamps of Pakistan were used from 20 December 1947 until 31 March 1948 and the British agency stamps from 1 April 1948 until 29 April 1966.

The first stamps specific to Muscat were an Indian issue with overprints on 20 November 1944 to commemorate the bicentenary of the Al-Busaid Dynasty. The issue in fifteen values from three paise to two rupees was the 1940–1943 Indian definitive set, featuring George VI, overprinted in Arabic script with "AL BUSAID 1363".

The first British stamps were nine current George VI definitives carrying surcharges ranging from one half anna to two rupees. Gibbons recorded twelve different issues of surcharged British stamps in Muscat, with varying numbers of values. These issues were mostly definitives but included some commemoratives such as the 1949 Universal Postal Union and 1957 World Scout Jubilee Jamboree sets.

== Bahrain ==
A sub-post office of Bushire was opened in Manama on 1 August 1884 under Indian administration. Indian stamps were used and, from 10 August 1933, were overprinted BAHRAIN. From 1 April 1948, postal administration was handled by the British agency until the Bahrain postal service was able to take over on 1 January 1966. British issues overprinted BAHRAIN and surcharged in annas or rupees were in use until the first stamps specific to Bahrain were issued on 1 July 1960.

== Kuwait ==
A post office under Indian administration was opened on 21 January 1915, having been proposed as early as 1904. The office was administered from Iraq until April 1941 and then by the Indian and Pakistani services until the British agency took over on 1 April 1948. Control passed to the Kuwaiti authorities on 31 January 1959. Indian stamps were used until 1923 when they began to be overprinted KUWAIT. From May 1941 until 1945, Indian stamps without overprint were again in use. The first British issue on 1 April 1948 were George VI definitives overprinted KUWAIT with a value in annas or rupees. Stamps specific to Kuwait were first issued on 1 February 1959.

== Qatar ==
Muscat issues were introduced to Qatar in May 1950 when the Doha post office opened under British administration. Until then, the small amounts of mail had been channeled through the Bahrain post office using Bahrain stamps. Additional offices opened at Umm Said on 1 February 1956 and at Dukhan on 3 January 1960. The Muscat issues continued until 1957 when British stamps overprinted QATAR were introduced. The first stamps specific to Qatar were issued on 2 September 1961 with five types ranging from five naye paise to ten rupees. The Qatar Post Department assumed full control of the service on 23 May 1963.

== Dubai ==
The stamps issued in Muscat were sold in Dubai until 6 January 1961. The two Trucial States types, which had eleven values, were introduced from 7 January 1961 to 14 June 1963 and were available in Dubai only. Dubai had one post office which was Indian in origin, under the Sind circle, and opened on 19 August 1909. Until 1947, Indian stamps were in use and are distinguished by the cancellation "Dubai Persian Gulf". Pakistani stamps were used until 31 March 1948 and then the British agency issues as in Muscat. Dubai assumed control of the postal service in June 1963 when the British agency closed and began issues of its own stamps the same year.

== Abu Dhabi ==
A British agency post office opened in Abu Dhabi on 30 March 1963, the postal service previously having been run via the office in Bahrain. A second office opened at the oil construction site on Das Island from 6 January 1966. The overprinted British stamps used in Muscat had been introduced to Abu Dhabi and Das Island in December 1960. Issues specific to Abu Dhabi began on 30 March 1964 and local control of the postal service began on 1 January 1967.

== See also ==
- Postage stamps and postal history of Muscat and Oman
- Postage stamps and postal history of Bahrain
- Postage stamps and postal history of Kuwait
- Postage stamps and postal history of Qatar
- Postage stamps and postal history of Abu Dhabi
- Postage stamps and postal history of the United Arab Emirates

== Bibliography ==
- Stanley Gibbons Postage Stamp Catalogue – British Commonwealth (various editions ed.). London: Stanley Gibbons Ltd.
- Rossiter, Stuart & Flower, John (1986). The Stamp Atlas. London: Macdonald. ISBN 0-356-10862-7.
