= Postage stamps and postal history of Qatar =

Qatar was a British protectorate from 1916 till it gained independence on 3 September 1971.

At first, in compliance with treaty obligations, British stamps were in use. These were issued in Indian rupee denominations with QATAR over-printed in English. Until 1950, the country's postal service was administered by an Indian post office in Bahrain. A British office was opened in Doha and sold stamps of British Postal Agencies in Eastern Arabia until 1957 when overprinted British stamps were introduced. Qatar Post took responsibility for postal administration in May 1963 and joined the Universal Postal Union in January 1969. The first Qatari stamps were issued in 1961 and there was an independence issue in January 1972. Since then, Qatar Post has continued to manage the country's postal administration and to issue its stamps, which are mostly relevant to Qatar itself.

== Treaty postal service established ==
Until 1915, Qatar was part of the Ottoman Empire though it was nominally ruled by a local Emir of the Al Thani dynasty which was established when the country was unified in 1851. In 1915, the Emir was Sheikh Abdullah bin Jassim Al Thani (1880–1957). In August 1915, Qatar was captured by British forces fighting against the Ottomans in the First World War. In 1916, as in other Arab states of the Persian Gulf (excluding Iraq and Saudi Arabia), the Emir agreed to the country becoming a British protectorate and Great Britain undertook to administer a postal service. Qatar continued to have special treaty relations with Great Britain until 3 September 1971, when it became an independent state.

Until 1950, any mail had to be sent privately to the post office in Bahrain, where an Indian postal administration had been in operation since 1884. Following the Partition of India in 1947, Bahrain postage was administered from Great Britain. On 18 May 1950, a British postal administration was established in Doha with some initial cancellations done at the British Political Office there. This was an unsatisfactory arrangement, however, and mail continued to be sent to Bahrain for two months until an official cancellation process was introduced at Doha in July. In August, a post office was opened to the public in Doha and the service was divorced from the political office. A second post office was opened at the Umm Sa'id oil terminal on 1 February 1956 and a third at Dukhan on the west coast in January 1960. The Qatari postal administration was established on 23 May 1963.

== British agency stamps ==
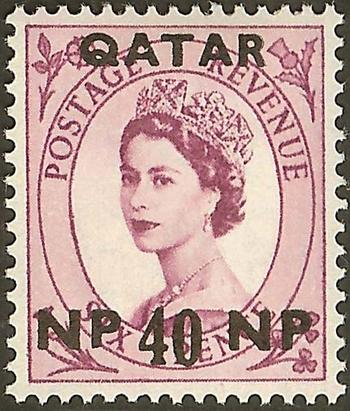
A British Wilding series stamp, issued 1 April 1957, and overprinted for use in Qatar

Until August 1950, British stamp with a BAHRAIN overprint were in use. From August 1950 to 31 March 1957, the post offices sold general issue British Postal Agencies in Eastern Arabia stamps. These were not overprinted. The same stamps were sold in Muscat and Dubai. They were also available in Bahrain and Kuwait when need arose. Mian Muhammad Rafique Ahmed (1919–2001), a Pakistani, was Qatar's first Postmaster General, appointed in 1955. The agency stamps were withdrawn from sale in April 1957 but nevertheless continued to be valid and were postmarked when used.

== British overprints ==
The inaugural Qatar issue on 1 April 1957 was twelve British definitives from the Wilding series and three higher value "Castles" commemoratives. All were overprinted QATAR and surcharged with a value in Indian currency ranging from 1 naya paisa (1np) to 10 Indian rupees (10r). The currency of Qatar at the time was 100 naye paise = 1 rupee. The British stamps were the 1952 definitive series featuring the Dorothy Wilding photograph of Queen Elizabeth II and the three 1955 commemoratives of the castles at Carrickfergus (2s 6d), Caernarfon (5s) and Edinburgh (10s), which also featured the Wilding portrait. There were seven basic designs of the definitives with values ranging from one halfpenny (½d) to one shilling and six pence (1s 6d). Later in 1957, three stamps from the British Scouting Jubilee series were issued and in 1960 a further series of Wilding stamps were issued with a different watermark. As with the inaugural issue, these were overprinted QATAR and surcharged in Indian currency.

== Qatari issues ==
The first stamps inscribed Qatar, rather than British stamps with the Qatar overprint, were a series of eleven definitives issued on 2 September 1961 and depicting Sheikh Ahmad bin Ali Al Thani (1922–1977). On 23 May 1963, Qatar Post took responsibility for postal services in Qatar and from 1966 the currency used on stamps was changed from rupees to dirhams and riyals. Qatar Post joined the Universal Postal Union on 31 January 1969 and, in 2012, hosted the 25th Universal Postal Union Congress. The event was held from September to October 2012.

The country became independent on 3 September 1971 and this was marked with a set of four stamps issued on 17 January 1972. Regular commemorative and definitive stamps have been issued since then, mostly on subjects relevant to Qatar. A postage stamp booklet was issued in 1977.
