= Postage stamps and postal history of Kuwait =

A 1964 45 fils stamp of Kuwait

This is a survey of the postage stamps and postal history of Kuwait.

== Early posts ==
The postal history of Kuwait begins around 1775, when the East India Company began an overland desert camel service from the head of the Persian Gulf to Aleppo and Constantinople as an alternative to slower sea travel around the Arabian Peninsula. This service operated until 1795.

== Treaty with the British ==
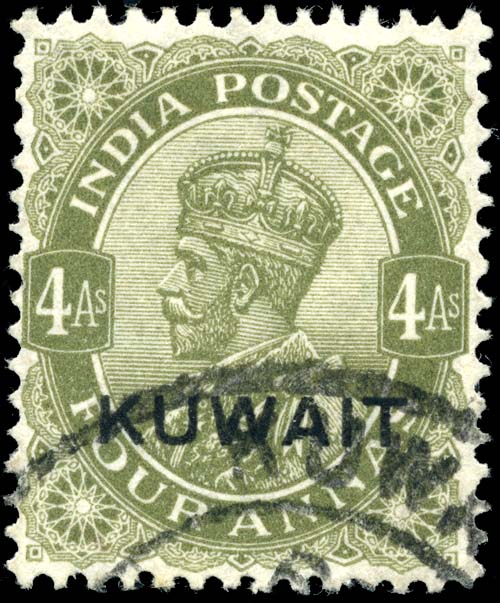
A KUWAIT overprint on a 1934 4 Anna stamp of India

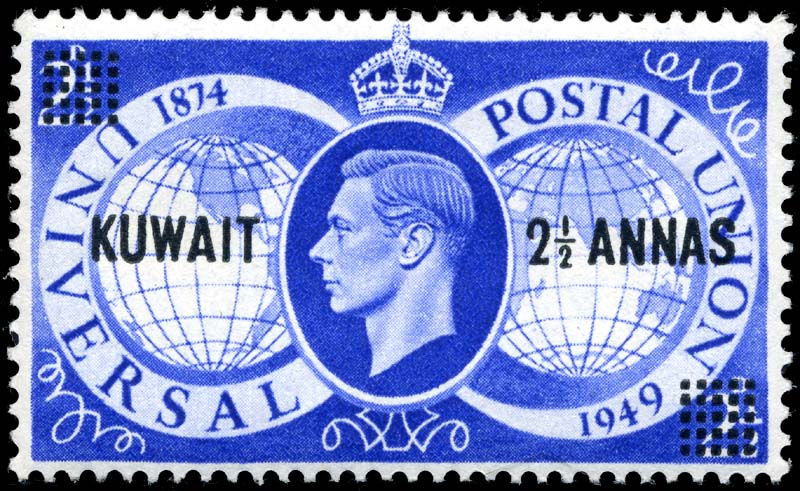
A British 1949 2 1/2p stamp for the 75th anniversary of the UPU overprinted for use in Kuwait

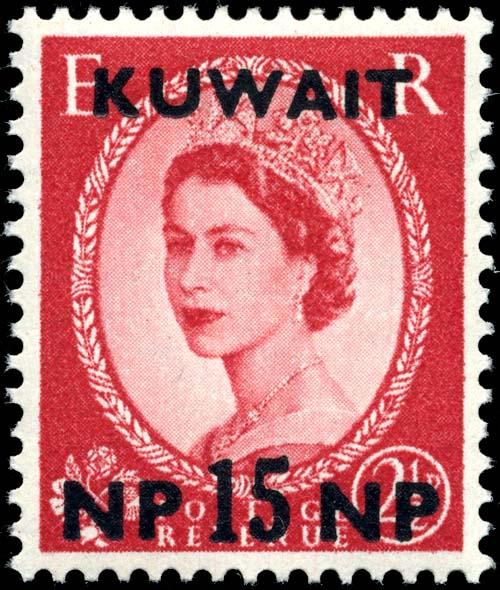
A 1957 British Wilding stamp overprinted 15np

After the treaty with the British in 1899, the consul's office handled mail, using stamps sent from Bushire, and forwarding mail to Bushire or putting it on passing ships. The first dedicated post office opened on 21 January 1915, and used stamps of India. From 1 August 1921 to April 1941 the office was administered from nearby Basra in Iraq. From 1 April 1923, Indian stamps were issued with "KUWAIT" overprints; this practice continued for many years.

In 1941 the post office was temporarily closed for about a month because of the Anglo-French invasion of Iraq (during which time mail was carried by diplomatic bag through London), then re-opened under Indian administration. Owing to wartime exigencies, the office used un-overprinted Indian stamps until 1945, when a new set of Indian stamps was overprinted. This phase came to an end with Indian independence; Kuwait was administered by Pakistan in 1947 and 1948, then by the British government directly from 1 April 1948.

Under British administration, British stamps were overprinted with values in annas and rupees. Unusually, the overprint was applied to all British stamps issued during this period, both regular and commemorative issues.

In 1957, the currency was decimalised, 100 naye paise (np) to a rupee, which necessitated a fresh set of overprints. These were to be the last stamps issued by the British.

== Kuwaiti control ==
In anticipation of their coming independence, the Kuwaitis took over postal administration on 31 January 1959. A first set of Kuwaiti stamps had already gone into production, with 5np and 10np values depicting Sheik 'Abd Allah III al-Salim al-Sabah, and a 40np value showing a dhow, being used on local mail in 1958. The full set of 13 values went on sale 1 February 1959, and included additional scenes of oil-related activities.

A 1961 30 fils stamp of Kuwait

== Independence ==
As part of independence in 1961, the government established the Kuwaiti dinar as its currency and reissued the 1959 stamps in the new values, also adding some new designs, for a total of 18 values, ranging from 1 fils to 3 dinars.

Subsequently, Kuwaiti stamp issues followed a pattern typical of many Arab countries, with designs tending to incorporate a fair amount of text, in both English and Arabic. The usual inscription reads "STATE OF KUWAIT". Definitive series included a natural-color portrait framed in silver in 1964, a portrait of Sheik Sabah in 1969, and a 32-stamp series in 1977 depicting popular games.

Kuwaiti issues came to an abrupt end with the 1990 invasion by Iraq. Iraqi stamps were used in the country until early 1991, at which point the regular Kuwaiti stamp program resumed.

== References and sources ==
Sources

- Scott catalog
- Rossiter, Stuart & John Flower. The Stamp Atlas. London: Macdonald, 1986. ISBN 0-356-10862-7
- Encyclopaedia of Postal Authorities
