= Postage stamps and postal history of Burma =

This is a survey of the postage stamps and postal history of the Republic of the Union of Myanmar, formerly known as Burma.

Burma is the largest country by geographical area in Indochina (mainland Southeast Asia). The country is bordered by China on the north-east, Laos on the east, Thailand on the south-east, Bangladesh on the west, India on the north-west and the Bay of Bengal to the south-west with the Andaman Sea defining its southern periphery.

== Indian stamps ==
Starting in 1854, Burma used the stamps of British India without any form of overprinting. The stamps may be identified by the postmarks used which, after 1856, were specially prepared for Burmese post offices.

== First stamps ==
The first stamps of Burma were stamps of British India overprinted BURMA from 1 April 1937. It is shown on Tharaphi Philately.

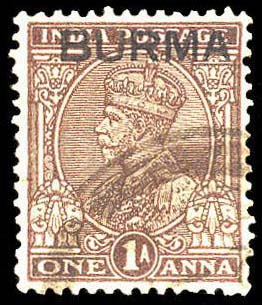

== Stamps inscribed Burma ==
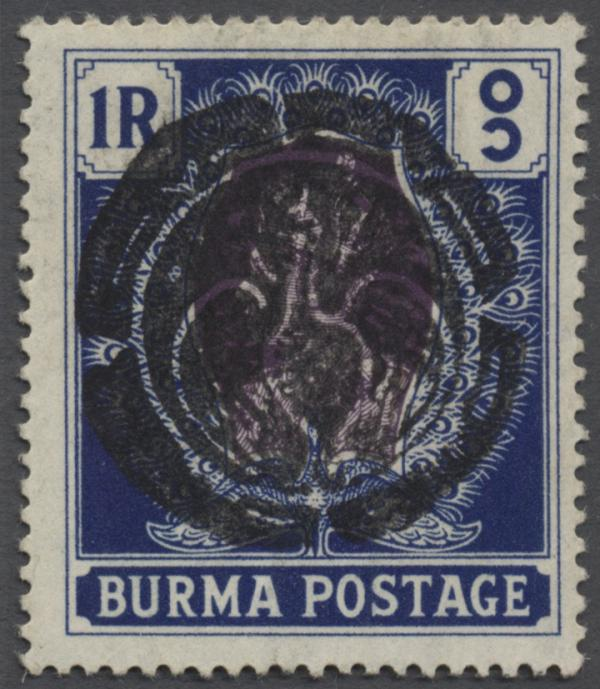
A stamp issued by the Burma Independence Army in 1942

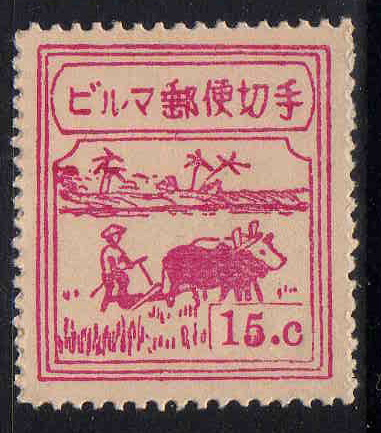
A stamp issued by the Japanese occupation forces

The first stamps inscribed Burma in the design, rather than simple overprints, were definitive stamps depicting King George VI issued between 1938 and 1940. On 6 May 1940 a commemorative stamp was issued to celebrate the centenary of the first postage stamp by overprinting one of the 1938 stamp with the inscriptions "Commemoration Postage Stamp 6th May 1840".

== Japanese occupation ==
During World War II, Burma was occupied by the Japanese between 1942 and 1945. Stamps were issued by the Japanese Army and by the Burma Independence Army in 1942. In 1943 and 1944 stamps were issued by the Burmese Government with the permission of the occupying forces.

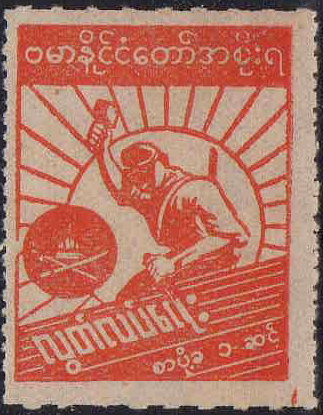
Stamp issued by the State of Burma during Japanese occupation

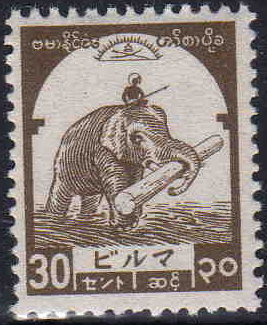
Stamp issued by the State of Burma during Japanese occupation

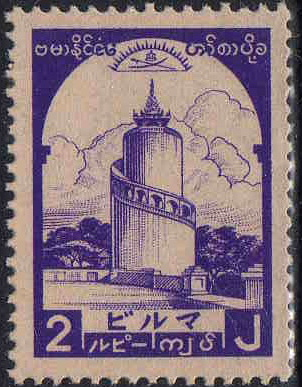
Stamp issued by the State of Burma during Japanese occupation

=== Shan States issues ===
In 1943, separate stamps were also issued for use in the Shan States under Japanese occupation.

== British Military Administration ==
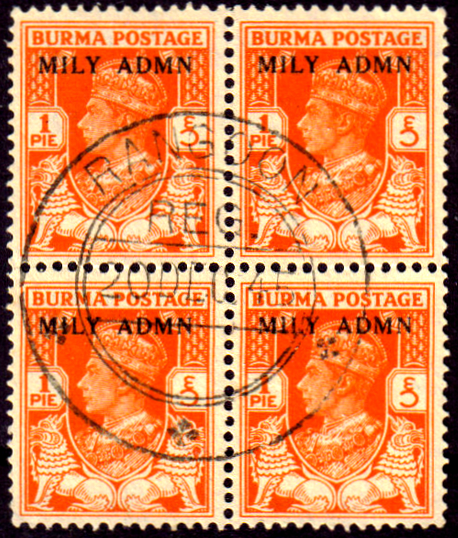
A block of four of the 1945 British Military Administration stamps of Burma used in Rangoon for registered mail

After the liberation of Burma, normal postal services were gradually restored under a British Military Administration. Pre-war stamps of Burma from 1938 were overprinted MILY ADMN in 1945.

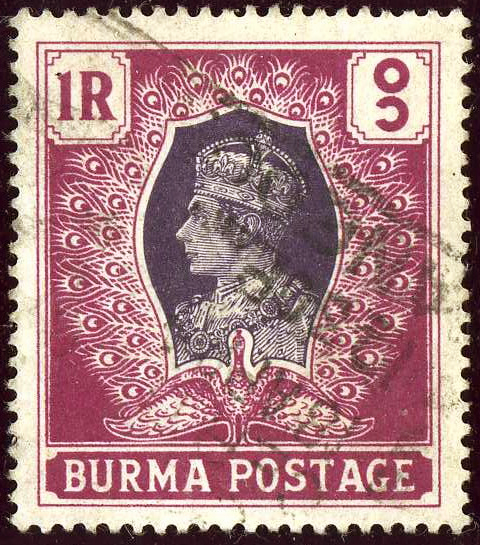
A 1946 postage stamp of Burma

== Civilian administration ==
When civilian administration of Burma was restored, new stamps were issued in the designs of the stamps from 1938 but in different colours. In 1946 a set of 4 Victory stamps were issued.

In 1947, the 1946 series was overprinted Interim Government in Burmese characters as Burma gained self government.

== Independence ==
On 4 January 1948 Burma became an independent republic as the Union of Burma and stamps were issued in that name until 1973. From 1974 stamps were marked Socialist Republic of the Union of Burma, and from 1990 Union of Myanmar. After The Multi-Party Democracy General Elections, special postage stamp issued on November 7, 2010, which shown THE REPUBLIC OF THE UNION OF MYANMAR until now. But the special postage stamps were issued a series of BIRD SPECIES NATIVE TO MYANMAR marked just MYANMAR.
