= Postage stamps and postal history of Guatemala =

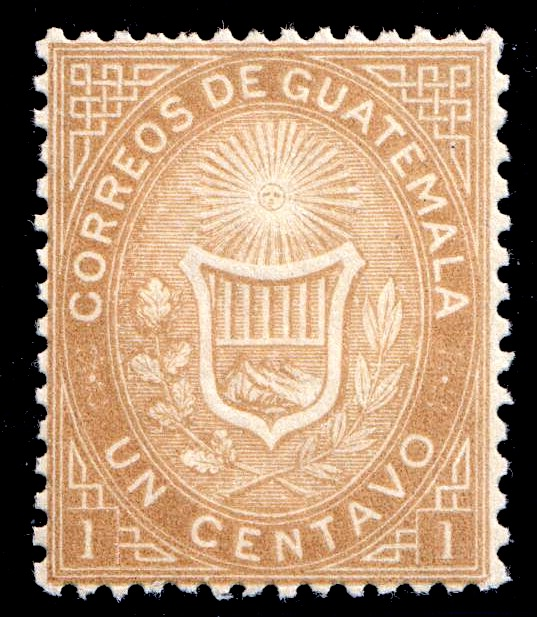
The 1c value from the first postage stamp of Guatemala, issued 1871

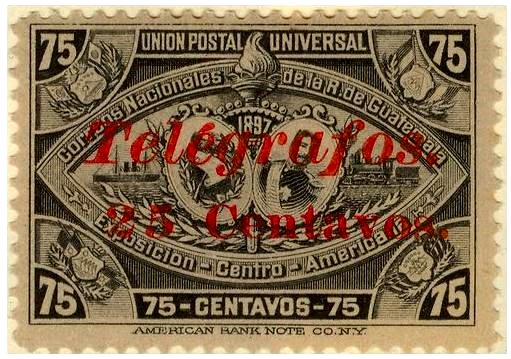
An 1898 telegraph stamp of Guatemala, produced by overprinting an earlier postage stamp

Guatemala has been independent from Spain since 1847. The first adhesive stamps of Guatemala were revenue stamps issued in 1868. The first postage stamps were produced in 1871.

== See also ==
- Revenue stamps of Guatemala
- 1868–1900 Stamps of Guatemala on Wikimedia Commons
