= Revenue stamps of Oman =

Type of label used to collect taxes in Oman

Revenue stamps of Oman were first issued in the 1930s and continue to do so to the present day. The first revenue stamps of c. 1930 consists of at least five stamps which depict palm trees and is inscribed State of Muscat and Oman in Arabic. Most examples of this issue are found in a private document archive, and very few are known in the hands of collectors.

The second issue depicts Al Jalali Fort in Muscat, and it is inscribed Sultanate of Muscat and Oman in Arabic, and dated 1365 AH (1945–46 AD). Two of the four values from this set are only known as proofs and not as issued stamps. A third set of three values dated 1382 AH (1962–63 AD) also depicts the same fort. The first to third issues were all denominated in Indian annas and rupees.

Between 1972 and 1974, a new set was issued denominated in Omani baiza and rials. It depicted the national emblem on a floral background and inscribed Sultanate of Oman in both Arabic and English. This issue was printed by Harrison and Sons and it consisted of fourteen values, four of which have not yet been recorded. In 1989, a similar set of ten stamps was issued, but the emblem was on a plain background and the printer was BDT International. In around 1998, the same design was issued with redrawn inscriptions, and in around 2011 it was issued in a slightly larger size. Seven different values from the c. 1998 and four from the c. 2011 issue have been recorded.

A set of five revenues was printed by Waterlow and Sons for the Omani region of Dhofar, but it is unclear if these were ever issued.

In the 1980s, labels were issued to pay for the Passenger Service Charge at Seeb International Airport in Muscat.

== See also ==
- Postage stamps and postal history of Muscat and Oman
