= Revenue stamps of Guatemala =

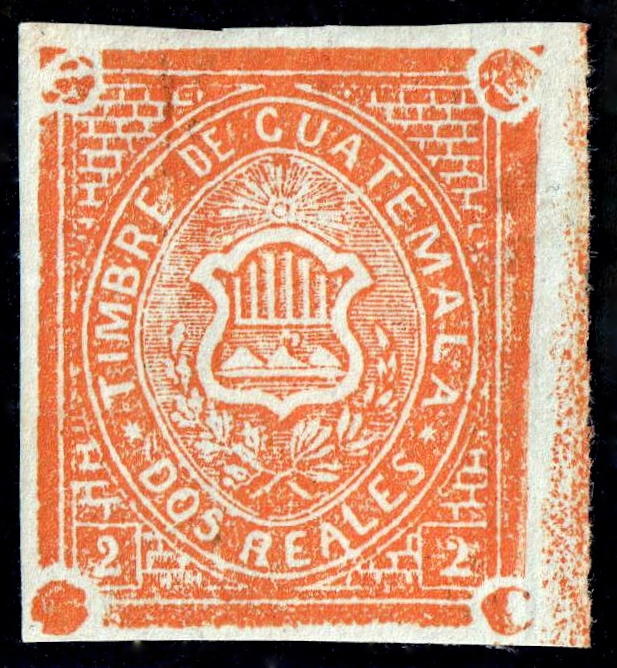
The 2 real stamp from the first revenue stamps of Guatemala.

The first adhesive revenue stamps of Guatemala were issued in 1868 and preceded the first postage stamps of that country by three years.

== Purposes ==
Guatemala has issued revenue stamps to collect documentary taxes, taxes on foreign bills and for other purposes. In addition, stamped paper had been in use since Spanish colonial times.

== Gallery ==
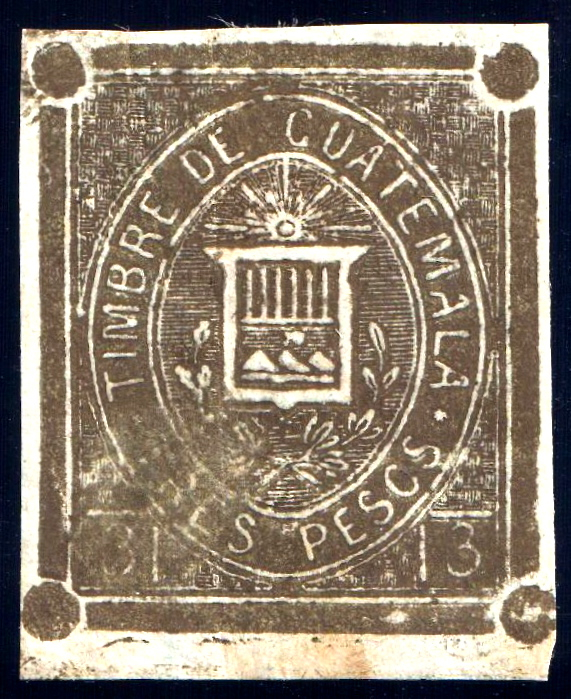
1868, tres pesos, first issue revenue stamp.

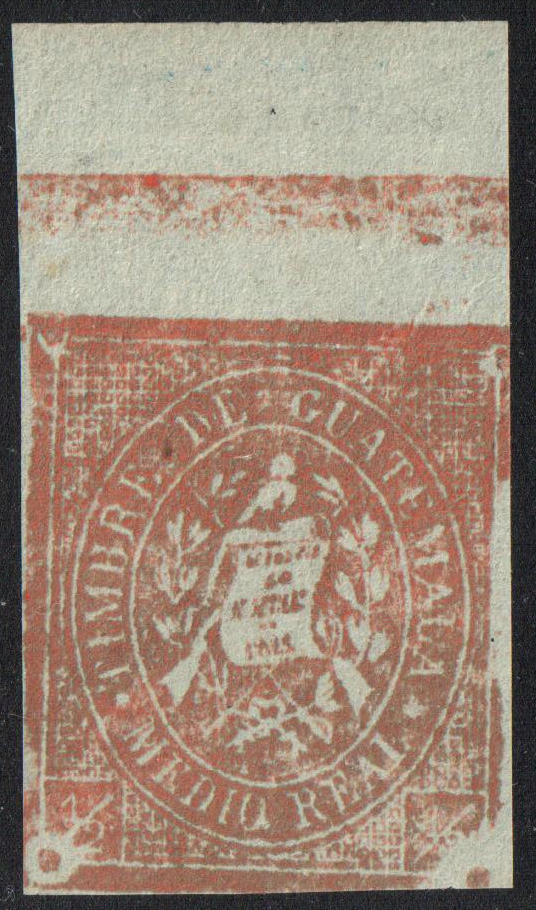
1874, medio real, second issue revenue stamp.

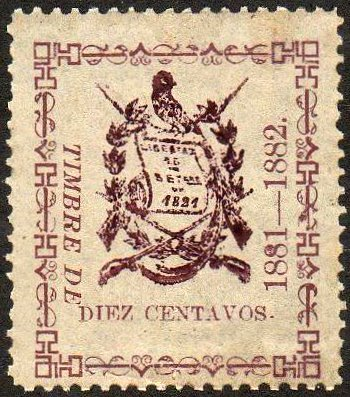
1881-82, diez centavos, third issue revenue stamp.

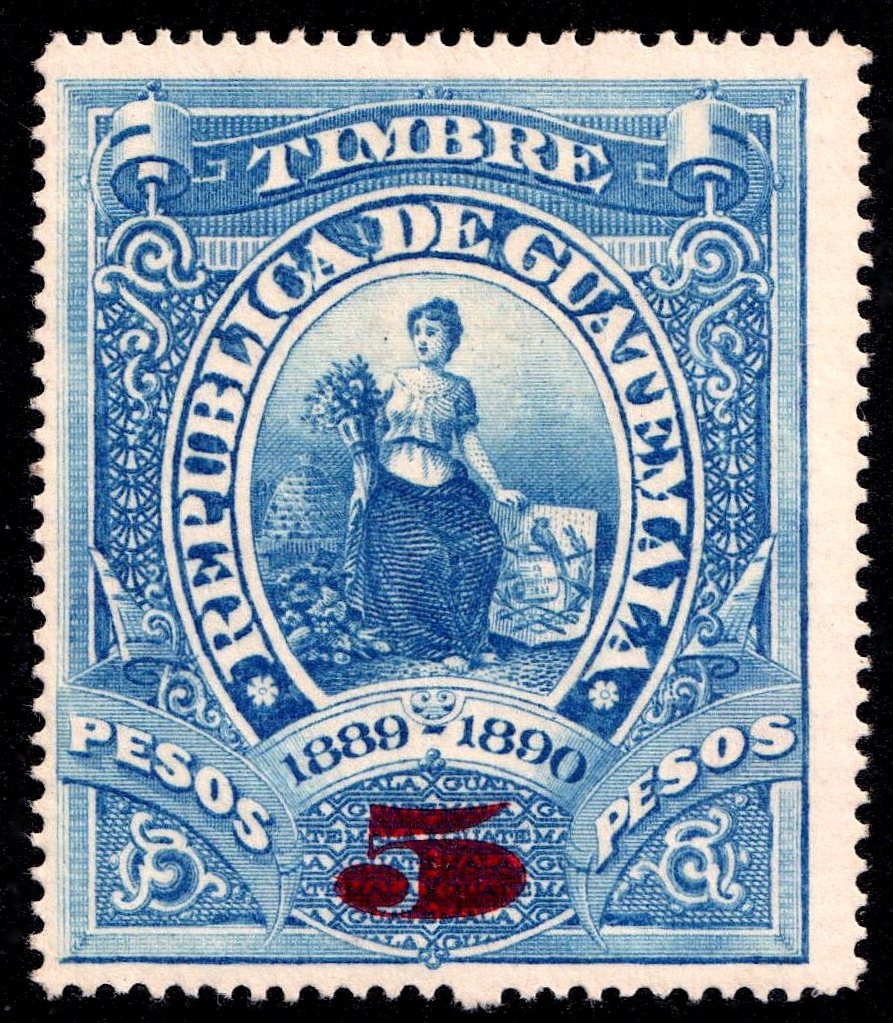
1889-90, 5 pesos, revenue stamp.

== See also ==
- Postage stamps and postal history of Guatemala
- 1868-1900 Stamps of Guatemala on Wikimedia Commons
