= Postage stamps and postal history of Muscat and Oman =

This is a survey of the postage stamps and postal history of Muscat and Oman, including the present day Sultanate of Oman.

== First post offices ==
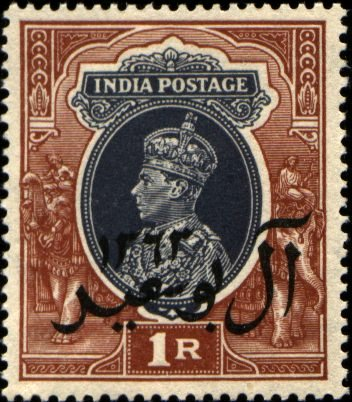
A stamp of British India overprinted in 1944 for use in Oman

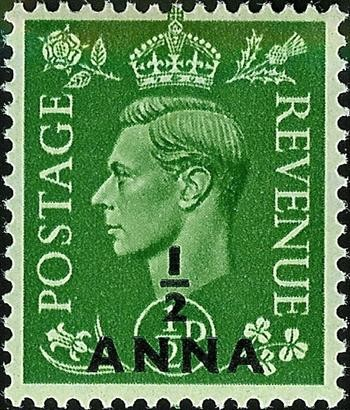
A surcharged British stamp issued in 1948 by the British Postal Agencies in Eastern Arabia

The first post office to open in the region was at Muscat on 1 May 1864. This was originally under the Bombay circle but it was transferred to the Sind (Karachi) circle in April 1869 and then back to Bombay in 1879. Postal control briefly passed to Pakistan after the Partition of India and then to Great Britain.

== First stamps ==
Muscat and Oman first used the stamps of India, then Pakistan, then British Postal Agencies in Eastern Arabia. Indian stamps were used from 1 May 1864 until 19 December 1947. Stamps of Pakistan were used from 20 December 1947 until 31 March 1948 and the British agency stamps from 1 April 1948 until 29 April 1966.

The first stamps specific to Muscat were an Indian issue with overprints on 20 November 1944 to commemorate the bicentenary of the Al-Busaid Dynasty. The issue in fifteen values from three pice to two rupees was the 1940–1943 Indian definitive set, featuring George VI, overprinted in Arabic script with "AL BUSAID 1363".

The first British agency stamps were George VI definitives carrying surcharges ranging from one half anna to two rupees. Gibbons recorded twelve different issues of surcharged British stamps in Muscat, with varying numbers of values. These issues were mostly definitives but included some commemoratives such as the 1949 Universal Postal Union and 1957 World Scout Jubilee Jamboree sets.

After the British agency closed, the Sultanate of Muscat and Oman assumed postal control from 30 April 1966. Stamps inscribed Muscat & Oman were issued from 1966, before finally issuing stamps as the Sultanate of Oman on 16 January 1971.

== See also ==
- Revenue stamps of Oman
