= Asyad =

Third-party logistics

Asyad Group
- Industry: Logistics, Transportation, Supply Chain and Storage
- Predecessor: Asyad Group
- Founded: 2016; 10 years ago
- Headquarters: Muscat, Oman,
- Services: Logistics Management
- Website: asyad.om

Asyad is a logistics service provider in Oman.

== History ==
Asyad was established in 2016 and is headquartered in Muscat, Oman. Asyad operates logistics solutions via ports, free zones, and maritime assets in the Arabian Peninsula. Asyad Group has three deep ports, two free zones, an economic zone, a dry dock, and a dry port. The group's maritime services include a fleet of 80 vessels which is largest dry docks in the Middle East.

== Operations ==
=== Asyad Shipping ===
Asyad Shipping operates a fleet of 80 vessels with a total deadweight capacity of 9.7 million tons.

=== Free Zones ===
Asyad Group operates two free zones: Sohar Freezone and Salalah Freezone. Three new plants began operations at Salalah Free Zone (SFZ), part of Asyad Group. These new additions contribute OMR 23.4 million to the existing investments and businesses in the free zone.

=== Ports ===
Asyad Group is the largest port operator in Oman, mainly the three main ports of Salalah, Sohar and Duqm. Asyad Group has partnered with the online logistics marketplace Zipaworld Innovation for expanding its business.

=== Asyad Drydock ===
Asyad Drydock is located at the Port of Duqm on the southeastern seaboard of Oman. The drydock features a 2,800-meter quay, a water depth of 9–10 meters, 14 sets of jib cranes, and two graving docks. The dry dock handle vessels up to 600,000 DWT.

=== Economic Zone ===
Asyad Group's economic zone, Khazaen Economic City (KEC), is an integrated logistics city located between Oman’s capital city of Muscat and the Sultanate’s industrial hub of Sohar.

=== Oman Post & Asyad Express ===
Oman Post and Asyad Express operates postal and logistics services, including e-post, e-commerce delivery and virtual P.O. boxes.
