= Qatar Post =

National provider of postal services in Qatar

- بريد قطر
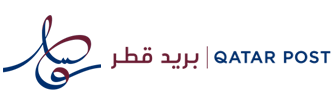
- Logo of Qatar Post

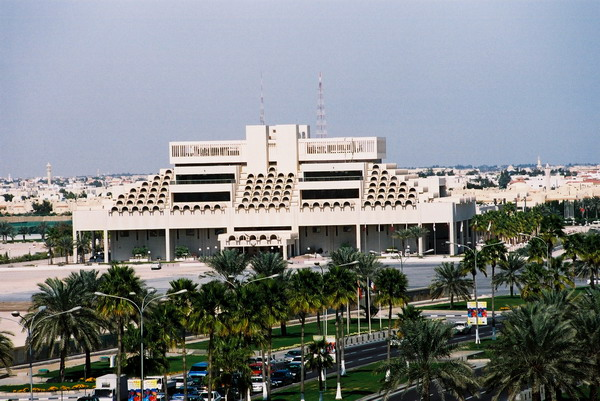
- Headquarters of Qatar Post Office

Postal Authority overview
- Formed: 1950
- Type: Agency of the Government of Qatar
- Headquarters: Doha, Qatar
- Motto: To Qatar, From Qatar, For Qatar.
- Postal Authority executive: Faleh Al Naemi, Chairman & Managing Director
- Parent department: Ministry of Communications and Information Technology
- Parent Postal Authority: Qatar Postal Services Company
- Website: Qatar Post

Qatar Post (formerly Q-Post) is the national provider of postal services in Qatar. Its headquarters building, the General Post Office, has been on the Doha Corniche since 1988.

The company was established in 1950 as the General Postal Corporation and the country's first post office opened in Doha that same year. At first, in compliance with treaty obligations, British stamps were in use. These were issued in Indian rupee denominations with QATAR over-printed in English. The first date-stamp was used for registered letters at Doha Post Office on 17 May 1953. Additional post offices were opened at Dukhan in 1956 and at Umm Said in 1960. In 1980, the company began to provide first-class mail. In 1988, the Central Post Office in Doha was built, though it had been planned to open two years earlier. Considered a good example of brutalist architecture and a prominent local landmark, the building's construction was contracted to British firm Comconsult.

In 2009, it was announced that Qatar had won the bid to host the 25th Universal Postal Union Congress (UPU) in 2012. The event was held in Doha from September to October 2012.

Qatar Post is part of the Ministry of Communications and Information Technology and is the exclusive national provider of postal services in the country. The service has seen considerable expansion. There were only three direct dispatches of overseas mail in 1963 and this had increased to well over 100 by 2018. The country has more than 130 post-boxes with daily collections. Qatar Post operates the country's largest vehicle fleet, ranging from motor bikes to large trucks.

In 2017 Fatma Ibrahim Al Sehlawi collaborated with British-Pakistani artist Shezad Dawood to create the Doha Modern Playground in Al Masrah Park, which drew inspiration from the Qatar Post Office headquarters.

== See also ==
- Postage stamps and postal history of Qatar
