= Postage stamps and postal history of Sierra Leone =

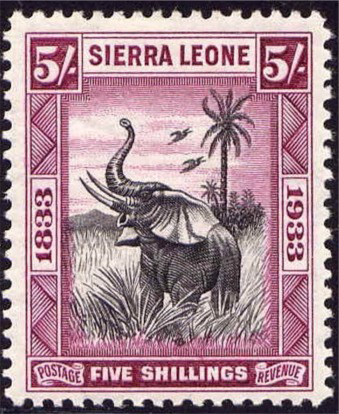
A 1933 stamp of Sierra Leone commemorating the centenary of abolition

This is a survey of the postage stamps and postal history of Sierra Leone.

Sierra Leone is a country in West Africa bordered by Guinea to the north and east, Liberia to the southeast, and the Atlantic Ocean to the west and southwest. It has a population estimated at 6.5 million and is a former British Colony.

== Early days ==
Unlike other British colonies, stamps of Great Britain were never officially used in Sierra Leone although examples from ships of the anti-slavery West Africa Squadron exist with local cancellations.

== First stamps ==
The first stamp of Sierra Leone was a 6d issued on 21 September 1859.

== Queen Victoria to King George V (1859–1935) ==
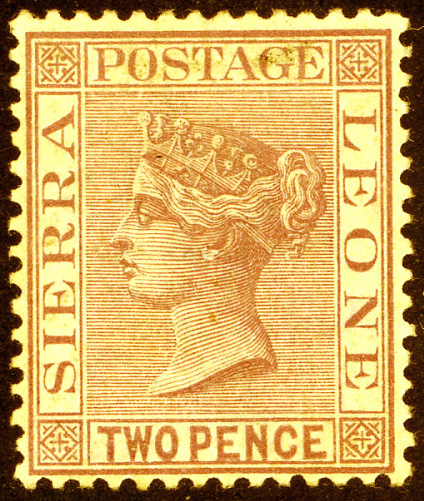
An 1883 stamp of Sierra Leone

A new set portraying Queen Victoria was issued in 1872, and this design continued in use until 1896. In 1896–97, a Victorian key type set of thirteen was issued. In 1897, 1d, 3d, 6d, 1s and 2s fiscal stamps were overprinted "POSTAGE AND REVENUE" and additionally surcharged 2½d (the 1d was never surcharged). All King Edward VII stamps are key types.

In 1912–1916, a King George V set was issued. All values up to 10d (except for the 3d) were key types. The 3d and 1s-£5 showed the King and the badge of the colony – an elephant. In 1932 a new definitive was issued portraying The King and a rice field (½d to 1s) or palm and cola trees (2s to £1). This was followed by a set of 13 issued in 1933 commemorating the centenary of abolition of slavery and the death of William Wilberforce. In 1935, the Crown Agents omnibus issue commemorating The King's Silver Jubilee was issued.

== King George VI and Queen Elizabeth II (1937–1961) ==
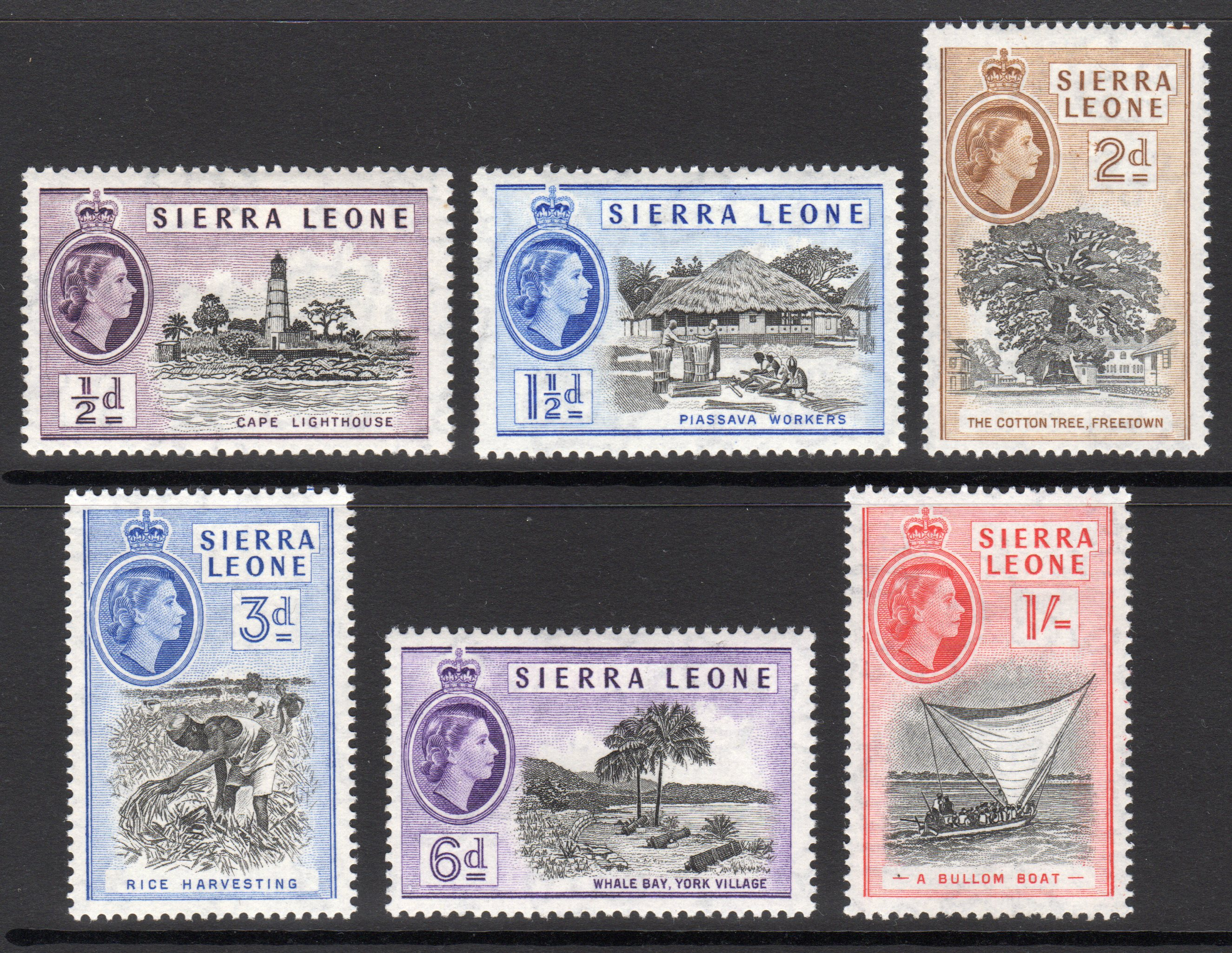
Stamps from the 1956 definitive series

Like many British colonies, the first King George VI set was the CA omnibus issue of the 1937 Coronation. A definitive was issued between 1938 and 1944, and was followed by the omnibus issues of Victory (1 October 1946), Royal Silver Wedding (1 December 1948) and 75th anniversary of the UPU (10 October 1949). The first stamp issue of Queen Elizabeth II was the coronation omnibus, followed by a definitive issued between 1956 and 1961.

== Independent and Republic (1961– ) ==
The first stamps of independent Sierra Leone were a definitive issue with the coat of arms instead of the Queen. In 1964, the new currency of cents and leones replaced the old British currency. This resulted in a large number of stamps overprinted with the new currency. Many stamps issued between 1964 and 1971 were in strange shapes, as those of Tonga. The country became a Republic in 1971, and although the republic's first issue was in the shape of a lion's head, later stamps were rectangular. Sierra Leone regularly issues both thematic and commemorative stamps in excessive amount that they are regarded as philatelic abomination rather than collectible items. Most of these products are printed by a Lithuanian printing house called Stamperija.

== Self-adhesive stamps ==
Sierra Leone issued the first self-adhesive stamp in February 1964, made by British printer Walsall.

== See also ==
- West Africa Study Circle
