= Evelyn Cheesman =

British entomologist

Evelyn Cheesman OBE
- Cheesman in the field, 1920
- Born: 8 October 1881; Westwell, Kent, England
- Died: 15 April 1969 (aged 87); London, England
- Known for: Biological collections from South Pacific expeditions
- Scientific career
- Fields: Entomology
- Workplaces: London Zoo, British Museum

External videos
- "Cheesman went on her last trip at the grand old age of 73", Jan Beccaloni, Natural History Museum

Lucy Evelyn Cheesman OBE (8 October 1881 – 15 April 1969) was a British entomologist and traveller. Between 1924 and 1952, Cheesman went on eight solo expeditions in the South Pacific, and collected over 70,000 specimens, which she accompanied with sketches and notes. These are now part of the collections of the Natural History Museum in London. Cheesman published extensively about her work and travels. In 1955, she was appointed an OBE for her services to science.

== Biography ==
=== Early life ===
Lucy Evelyn Cheesman was one of five children of Florence Maud Tassell and Robert Cheesman, born 8 October 1881. Lacking both money and education, she worked for a time as a governess with the Murray-Smith family in Gumley, Leicestershire, but did not find it congenial work. She taught herself French and German by travelling in both countries. Interested in the natural world, Cheesman was unable to train for a career as a veterinary surgeon because the Royal Veterinary College did not accept women students in 1906. Women were admitted after the Sex Disqualification (Removal) Act 1919 came into force.

During World War I, she worked as a civil servant at the Admiralty, where her German was useful in identifying businesses that were German sympathizers, for the Neutral and Enemy Trade Index (NETI).

=== Zoo, expeditions, museum ===
After the war she met Harold Maxwell-Lefroy, professor of entomology at Imperial College of Science and honorary curator of the insect house at the London Zoological Gardens, and studied entomology. In May 1917, Evelyn took up the position of Assistant Curator of Insects at London Zoo. In 1919 she became a fellow of the Royal Entomological Society of London. In 1920 she was the first woman employed as a curator at London Zoo.

In 1924 she was invited to join a zoological expedition to the Marquesas and Galapagos Islands on the St. George sailing yacht, serving as an entomologist alongside Anglo-Irish explorer and entomologist Cynthia Longfield. The expedition was a private one, a mix of scientists and tourists with divergent aims and interests. Cheesman considered the expedition to be disorganised, and left it at Tahiti, along with Cyril Crossland. She was able to continue exploring and gathering specimens on her own with the help of £100 from her brother Percy, who sent her money after he heard rumours about the expedition's possible financial instability. From then on, Cheesman preferred to travel alone.

In 1926, she resigned as Insect Curator and affiliated herself, unpaid, with the natural history department of the British Museum (now the Natural History Museum). She spent most of the next twelve years on expeditions, travelling to New Guinea, the New Hebrides and other islands in the Pacific Ocean. In New Guinea she made a collecting expedition to the coastal area between Aitape and Jayapura (known as Hollandia at the time) and visited the nearby Cyclop Mountains. She treated indigenous populations with respect, learning from them, and was known in the islands as ‘the woman who walks’ and ‘the lady of the mountains’. In her writings she recorded indigenous ways of life that few outsiders had ever seen, and that were beginning to disappear even in her time.

=== World War II and semi-retirement ===
During the Second World War she returned to England and did war work, but injured her back descending from a train during the blackout. After the war, in 1949–50, she travelled to the Pacific islands again, but due to ongoing pain, decided to give up active exploration. She assisted at the Natural History Museum for many years as an unpaid volunteer. She supported herself with the income from her writing, living frugally. In 1954, after hip replacement surgery, at the age of seventy-three, she felt well enough to again go on an expedition to Aneityum in the South Pacific. She had a house, named 'Red Crest', built for herself about five kilometres inland from Alelgauhat village. During her nine-month stay she collected 10,000 insects and 500 plants.

She was made an Officer of the Order of the British Empire (OBE) in the 1955 New Year Honours, and was granted a civil list pension in the same year for her contributions to entomology, giving her some financial security. In an interview, given at the time of the award, she is reported to have said "We drop down, or get run over, but we never retire." She continued to work at the museum, writing and classifying specimens, until her death in London on 15 April 1969.

== Family ==
Her older brother, Colonel Robert Ernest Cheesman (1878–1962), was a desert explorer, a diplomat in Iraq, Arabia and Ethiopia, and the author of In Unknown Arabia (1926) and other works. He is credited with discovering Gerbillus cheesmani. He was also an OBE. Their entries are listed next to each other in the Dictionary of British and Irish botanists and horticulturalists. The British artist Edith Cheesman was her older sister.

== Discoveries ==
=== Insects ===
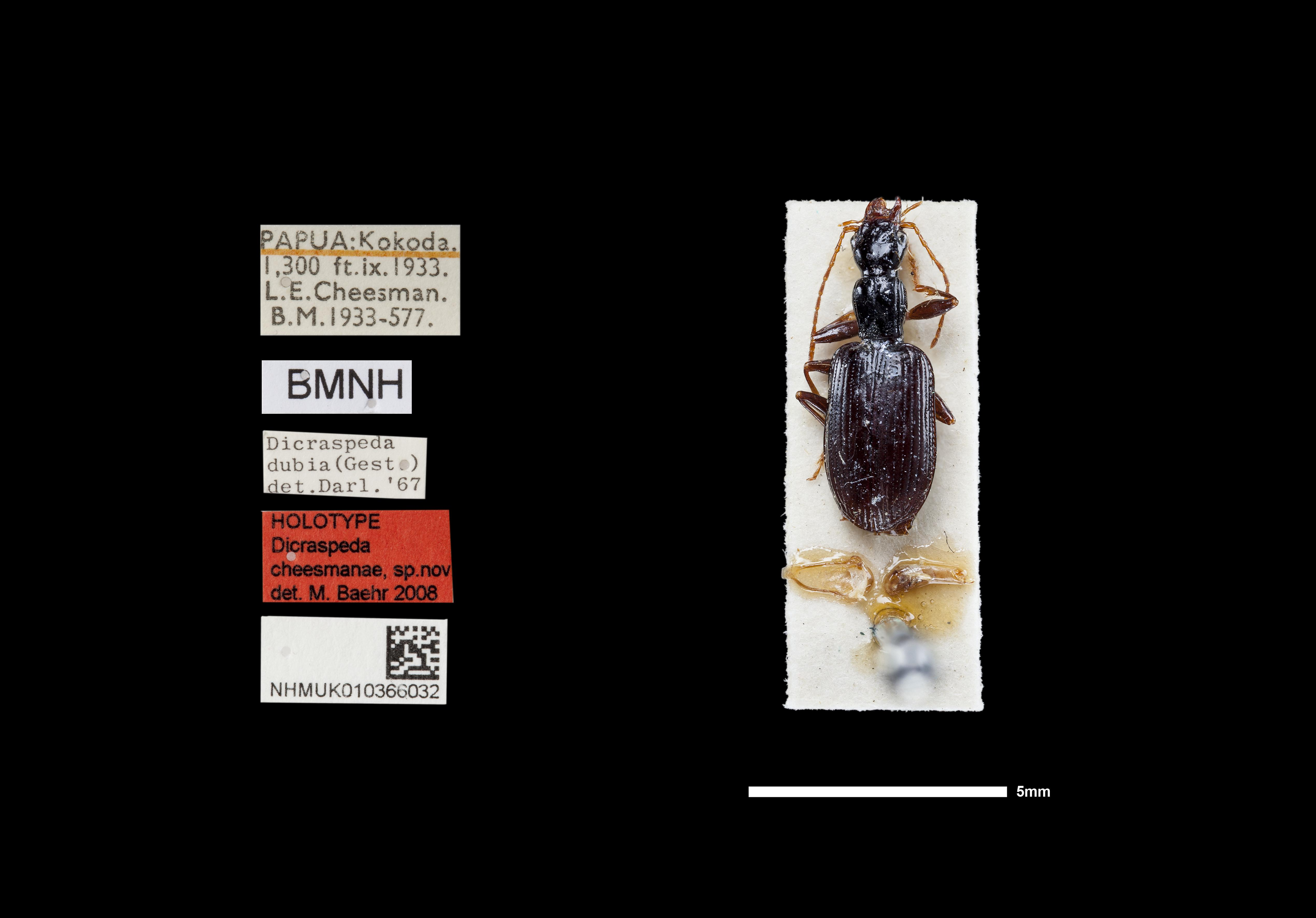
Holotype of Dicraspeda cheesmanae Baehr, 2009 collected by Cheesman

Evelyn Cheesman made the first systematic studies of the insect life of the islands she visited in the South Pacific. Her findings challenged the belief of her time that insect species of the south-west Pacific were most closely related to those of Australia. Her work supported theories about the spread of populations in the area that indicated life in New Guinea was Asian in origin rather than Australian. A number of insect species are named after her including the recently described true bug Costomedes cheesmanae. She also named the genus Buysmania after Maarten Buysman, who collected insect specimens on Java.

=== Amphibians and reptiles ===
She also collected reptiles and amphibians, and several New Guinea species were named in her honour:

- Platymantis cheesmanae Parker, 1940 – Cyclops Range ground frog (Ceratobatrachidae)
- Barygenys cheesmanae Parker, 1936 – Mt. Tafa burrowing frog (Microhylidae)
- Cophixalus cheesmanae Parker, 1934 – Cheesman's hill-forest frog (Microhylidae)
- Nyctimystes cheesmani or Litoria cheesmani (Tyler, 1964) – Cheesman's big-eyed treefrog (Hylidae)
- Lipinia cheesmanae Parker, 1940 – Cheesman's lipinia, Cheesman's moth skink (Scincidae)

The tree frog is interesting in that the herpetologist who described it, has used the masculine genitive ending 'i' instead of the feminine 'ae', showing an assumption that the collector must have been a man.

=== Orchids ===
In 2013, Cheesman was credited as the discoverer of one of the very few blue-flowered epiphytic orchids known to exist, Dendrobium azureum. Records showed that she had collected the specimen on 17 June 1938 on the summit of Mt. Nok, an extinct volcano on the remote island of Waigeo, off New Guinea. Cheesman describes collecting the orchids in her book Six-legged Snakes in New Guinea:

Pushing through the scrub, beautiful sprays of orchids forced themselves on your attention by brushing your face. The next few steps would have to be tunnelled through climbing fern, and then more orchids on trees with moisture continuously dripping off fringes of moss. Large clusters of a leguminous bloom like white acacia drooped from small trees. There were cream, pale lemon, and brilliant blue orchids, but the colours orange and scarlet predominated, flaming out of the green.

Her blue orchid specimens were identified as a new species in 2013, by André Schuiteman, senior researcher in orchids at Kew. No other collected specimens are known to have been found, and it is unknown whether the species still exists.

=== Plants ===
Solanum cheesmaniae, a species of wild tomato native to the Galapagos Islands, is named in her honor.

== Bibliography ==
Cheesman was the author of many books and scientific articles on entomology and her travels. These include:

- The Ants of Timothy Thümmel, 1924 (co-author)
- Everyday Doings of Insects, 1924
- The Great Little Insect, 1924
- Chapters from everyday doings of insects, 1927
- Islands near the sun; off the beaten track in the far, fair Society Islands, 1927
- The Cyclops Mountains of Dutch New Guinea, 192?
- A First Book of Nature Study, 1931
- The growth of living things; a book of nature study, 1932
- Hunting insects in the South seas, 1932
- Backwaters of the savage South seas, 1933
- Insect behaviour, 1933
- The warp and weft of life, 1934
- The two roads of Papua, 1935
- Marooned in Du-Bu cove, 193?
- The land of the red bird, 1938
- "The mountainous country at the boundary, north New Guinea : Japanese operations in New Guinea", Geographical journal, v. 98, no. 4, Oct. 1941 and v. 101, no. 3, Mar. 1943
- Camping Adventures in New Guinea, 1948
- Camping adventures on cannibal islands, 1949
- Six-legged snakes in New Guinea; a collecting expedition to two unexplored islands, 1949
- Naturalists' expeditions in the pacific, 1950
- Landfall the unknown : Lord Howe Island 1788, 1950
- Insects: their secret world, 1952
- Insects indomitable, 1952
- Charles Darwin and his problems, 1955
- Sealskins for silk: Captain Fanning's voyage around the world in a brig in 1797–99, 1956
- Things worth while, 1957
- Time well spent, 1960
- Microlepidoptera from the New Hebrides. Records and descriptions of microlepidoptera collected on the island of Aneityum by Miss Evelyn Cheesman by John David BRADLEY; Evelyn Cheesman, 1962
- Miss L. E. Cheesman's Expeditions to New Guinea by Douglas Eric KIMMINS; Evelyn Cheesman, 1962
- Who stand alone, 1965
