= Postage stamps and postal history of Iraq =

This is a survey of the postage stamps and postal history of Iraq. It includes special uses under the Ottoman Empire as well as occupation issues.

== Early postal arrangements ==
The earliest postal service known in the area of present-day Iraq was operated by Assyria; archeologists have found a large number of commercial letters written in cuneiform on clay tablets, and enclosed in addressed clay envelopes.

== Ottoman postal service ==
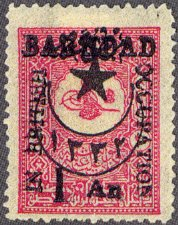
Stamp for the British Occupation of Baghdad overprinted on stamp of the Ottoman Empire, 1917

The Ottoman Empire had post offices at Baghdad, Basra, Mosul, and Kirkuk by 1863. India operated post offices in Baghdad and Basra from 1868 to 1914. Prior to 1923, the French operated a post office in Baghdad.

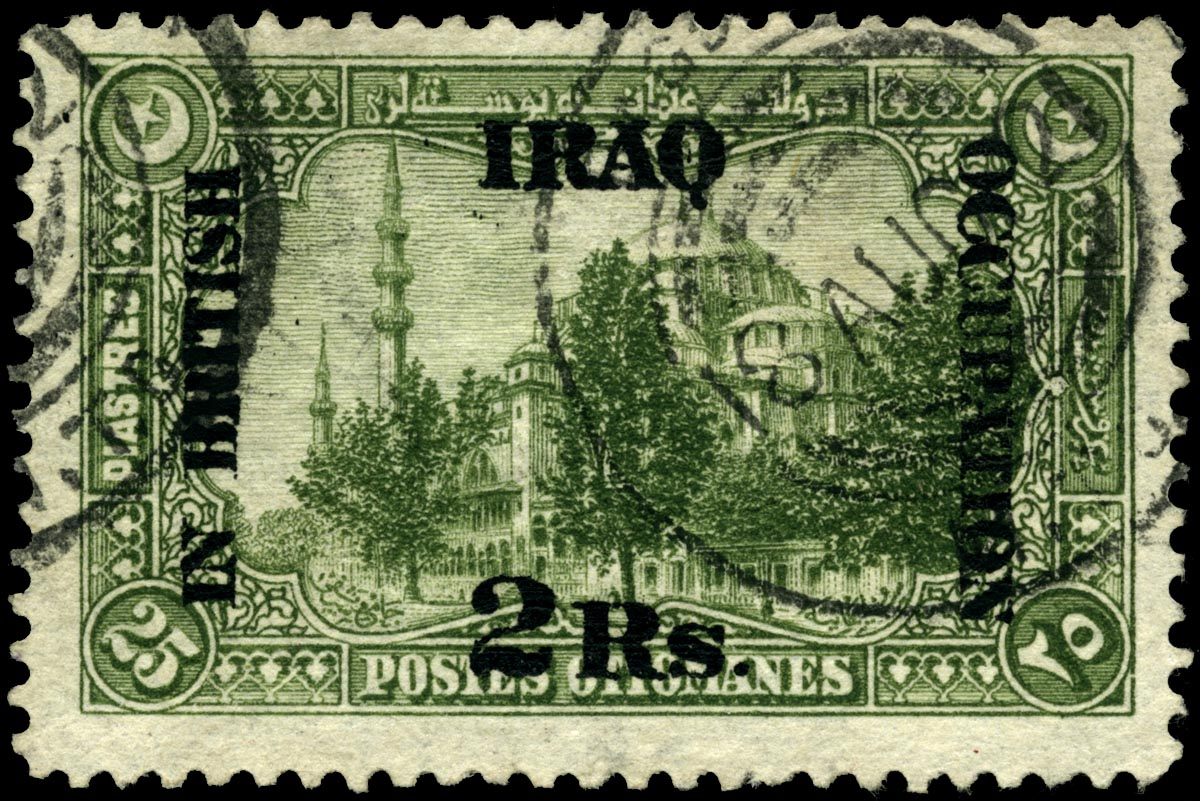
Stamp for the British Occupation of Mesopotamia, 1918

== World War I ==
During World War I, British and Indian troops fought their way from Basra to Mosul; they used stamps of India overprinted "I.E.F." on their military mail. The British overprinted a variety of Ottoman stamps during their occupation, a grouping now conventionally called the issues of "Mesopotamia".

== British mandate ==
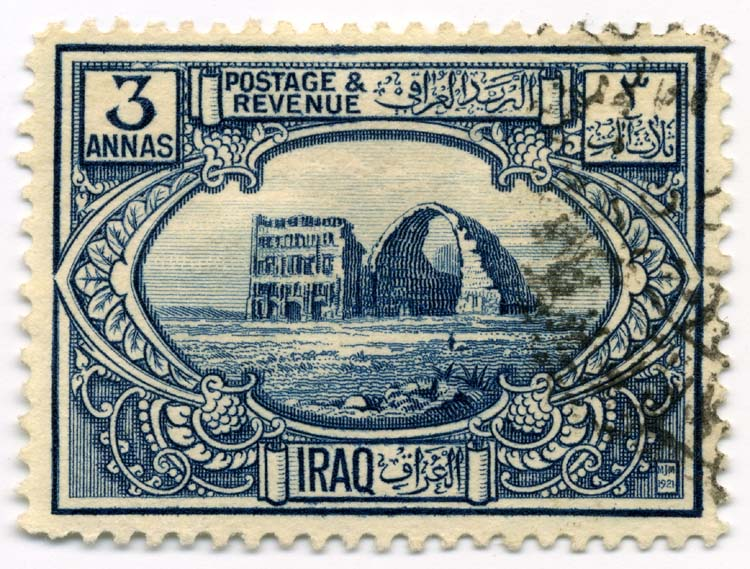
A 1923 3 annas stamp of Iraq, designed by Marjorie Maynard, depicting the ruins of the Kasra arch in Ctesiphon

The postal service of Iraq proper began with the British mandate granted by the League of Nations in 1920.

The first stamps of Iraq were a definitive series that appeared in 1923; the set of 12 included eight different designs depicting scenes and images from ancient history and the present day. They were denominated in annas and rupees, inscribed with "IRAQ" and "POSTAGE & REVENUE" and were designed by Edith Cheesman and Marjorie Maynard. The first stamp depicting Faisal I of Iraq was a 1-rupee value in 1927, followed in 1931 by a series of 13 values.

== Independence ==
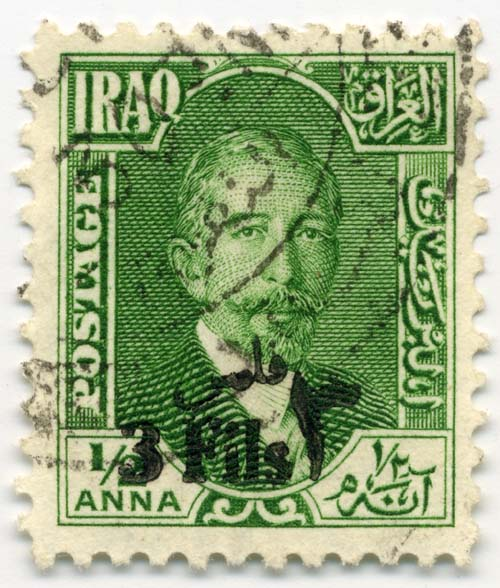
King Faisal I half-anna overprinted 3 fils, 1932

Independence in 1932 brought a new currency (fils and dinar), and the existing Faisal stamps were surcharged accordingly, and issued on 1 April 1932. These were followed soon after (9 May) by stamps of the previous design denominated in the new currency. The accession of King Ghazi necessitated new stamps, which appeared in 1934; they were of the same design as the Faisal stamps, but with a profile of Ghazi in the vignette.

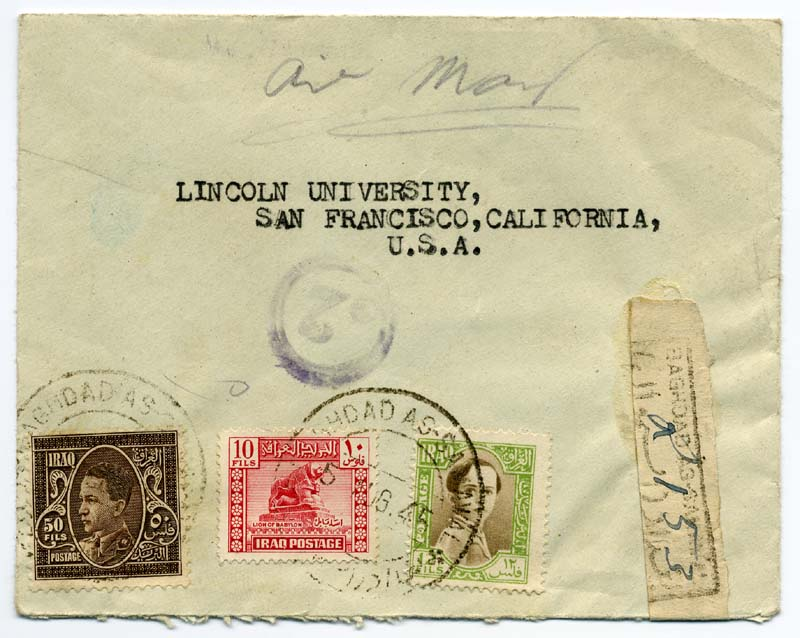
Registered mail sent in August 1945, with stamps from the series of 1934, 1941, and 1942

Due to Ghazi's unexpected death and the infancy of his son, in 1941 a new series was issued featuring local scenery. Along with additional values and color changes issued the next year, the series totals 23 stamps. 1942 also saw the first stamps depicting Faisal II, who was still a young boy. He appears as a teenager in the next series, which was issued in 1948.

== First commemorative stamps ==
Iraq's first commemorative stamps came out in 1949 to mark the 75th anniversary of the Universal Postal Union. Faisal's 1953 coronation was also marked by a set of three, along with a souvenir sheet. The last of the Faisal definitives had only partly appeared before the revolution of 1958, and both issued and unissued types were overprinted.

== Republic ==
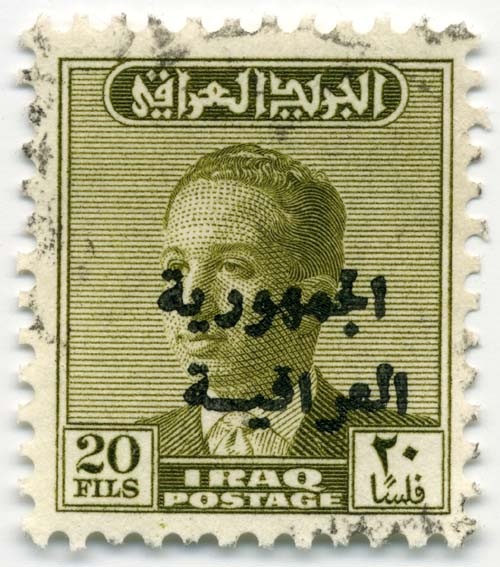
King Faisal II 20 fils overprinted for the republic, 1958

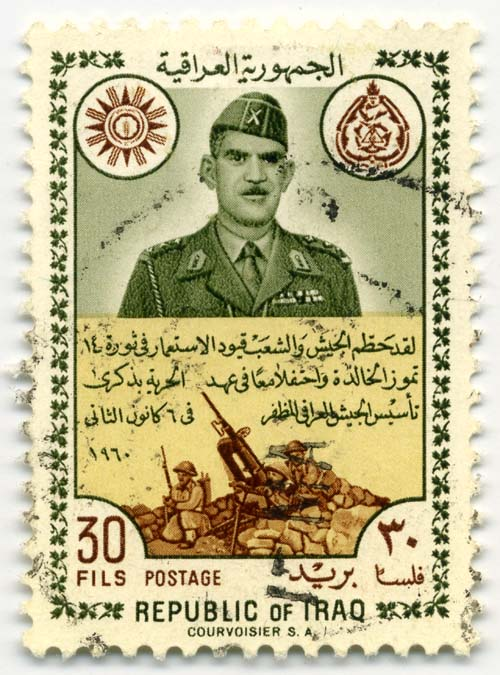
A 1960 stamp of Iraq depicting General Qassim

General Qassim's period was noted by the usual round of commemoratives, many featuring him as benevolent leader. Later presidents also appeared, though less frequently. Saddam Hussein, as vice-president, makes a first appearance in a souvenir sheet of 1976, and by the mid-1980s appeared on a great many Iraqi stamps.

== Post-Saddam era ==
The 2003 invasion of Iraq brought the stamp program to a sudden halt, the last Saddam-era issue being a Saddam University stamp on 5 February 2003. Two additional issues were planned, themed "Old Methods of Transportation" and "Popular Industries", and proofs had been made. The printing works were destroyed in the looting, but not the Post Office building, and the proofs survived. The Coalition Provisional Authority subsequently approved the printing of the Transportation stamps, and they were issued 29 January 2004. In the meantime, overprints appeared on various stamps, but none were officially authorized.

== Fantasies and bogus issues ==
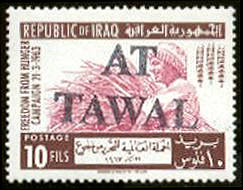
Al Tawal overprint on Freedom from Hunger stamp

Beginning in 1963 a number of Iraqi stamps appeared overprinted "AT TAWAL", supposedly for "Al Tawal" the so-called neutral zones between Iraq and Saudi Arabia. These were a student hoax that continued until 1970.

== See also ==
- Iraqi Telecommunications and Post Company

== References and sources ==
Sources

- Pearson, Patrick and E.B. Proud, The Postal History of Iraq. Proud-Bailey, 1996 ISBN 1-872465-19-6.
- Armitage, Douglas & Robert Johnson. Iraq Postal History 1920s to 1940s. Rossiter Trust, May 2009.
- Stanley Gibbons Ltd: various catalogues.
- Encyclopaedia of Postal Authorities
- Rossiter, Stuart & John Flower. The Stamp Atlas. London: Macdonald, 1986. ISBN 0-356-10862-7
