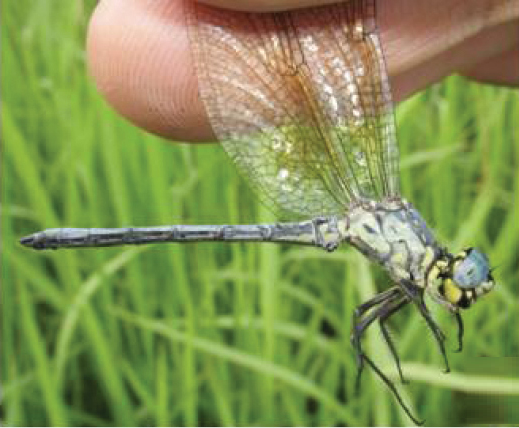

Conservation status
- Near Threatened (IUCN 3.1)

Scientific classification
- Kingdom: Animalia
- Phylum: Arthropoda
- Class: Insecta
- Order: Odonata
- Infraorder: Anisoptera
- Family: Libellulidae
- Genus: Micromacromia
- Species: M. flava

Binomial name
- Micromacromia flava (Longfield, 1947)

Synonyms
- Monardithemis flava Longfield, 1947

= Micromacromia flava =

Species of dragonfly

Micromacromia flava is a species of dragonfly in the family Libellulidae. It is found in Angola and Zambia.
