= Atoconeura kenya =

Conservation status
- Least Concern (IUCN 3.1)

Scientific classification
- Kingdom: Animalia
- Phylum: Arthropoda
- Clade: Pancrustacea
- Class: Insecta
- Order: Odonata
- Infraorder: Anisoptera
- Family: Libellulidae
- Genus: Atoconeura
- Species: A. kenya

Binomial name
- Atoconeura kenya Longfield, 1953

Species of dragonfly

Atoconeura kenya, the Kenyan highlander, is a species of dragonfly in the family Libellulidae. It is native to eastern Africa, where it is known from Kenya, Tanzania, Uganda, and the Republic of South Sudan. It lives near mountain streams. It is widespread, but in some areas it is affected by the degradation of its habitat.
