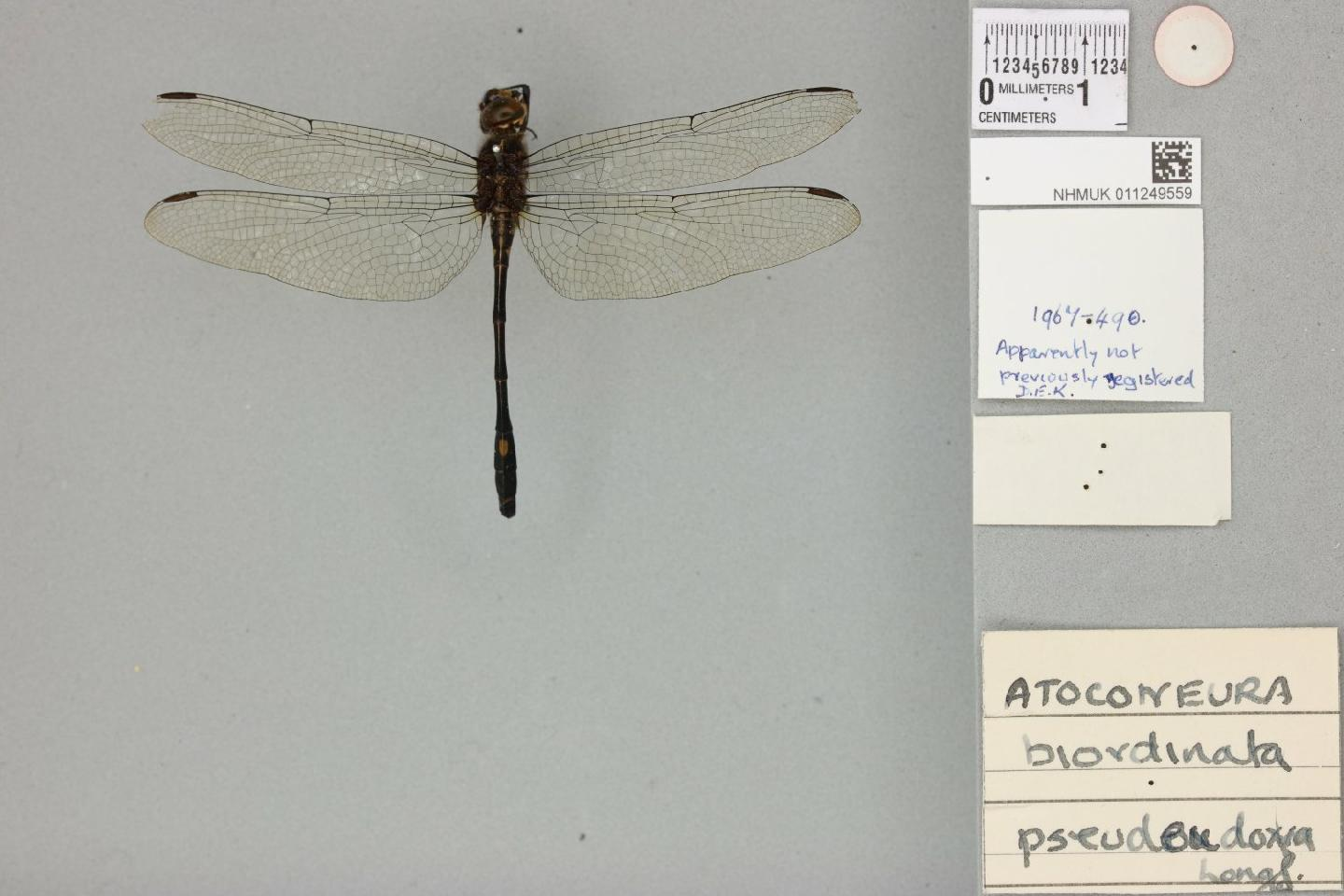

Conservation status
- Least Concern (IUCN 3.1)

Scientific classification
- Kingdom: Animalia
- Phylum: Arthropoda
- Clade: Pancrustacea
- Class: Insecta
- Order: Odonata
- Infraorder: Anisoptera
- Family: Libellulidae
- Genus: Atoconeura
- Species: A. pseudeudoxia

Binomial name
- Atoconeura pseudeudoxia Longfield, 1953

= Atoconeura pseudeudoxia =

Species of dragonfly

Atoconeura pseudeudoxia, the hairy-legged highlander, is a species of dragonfly in the family Libellulidae. It is native to Zambia, the Republic of the Congo, the Democratic Republic of the Congo, and Uganda. It lives along the banks of mountain forest streams. In general it is widespread, but in some parts of Uganda it is threatened by the degradation of its habitat.
