= Maarten Buysman =

Dutch botanist

- Born: January 1856; Zaandam, Netherlands
- Died: June 1919 (aged 62–63); Lawang, Malang, Dutch East Indies
- Scientific career
- Fields: Botany

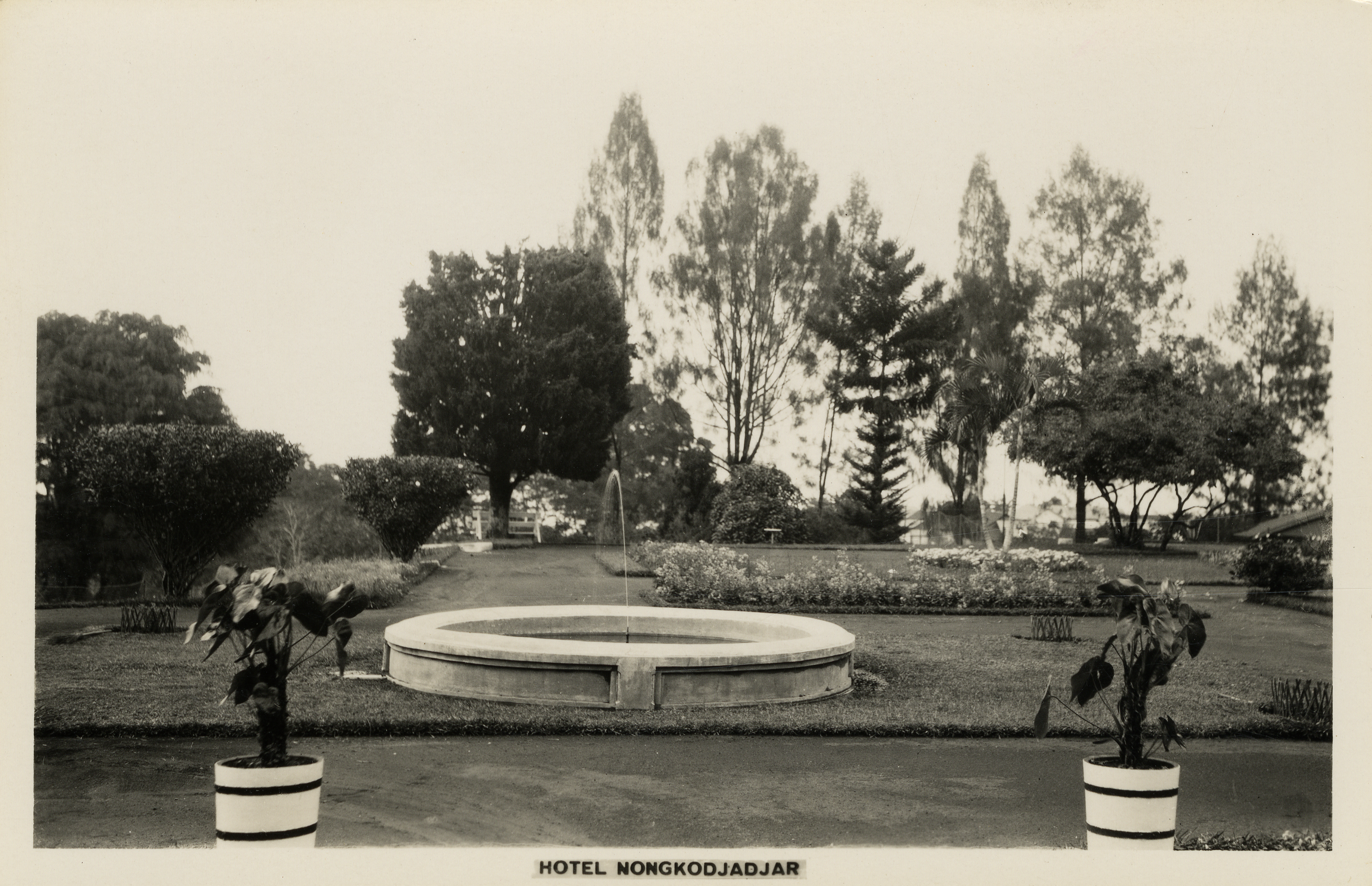
The gardens at Hotel Nongkodjadjar, 1910, where Buysman worked. KITLV 1404270

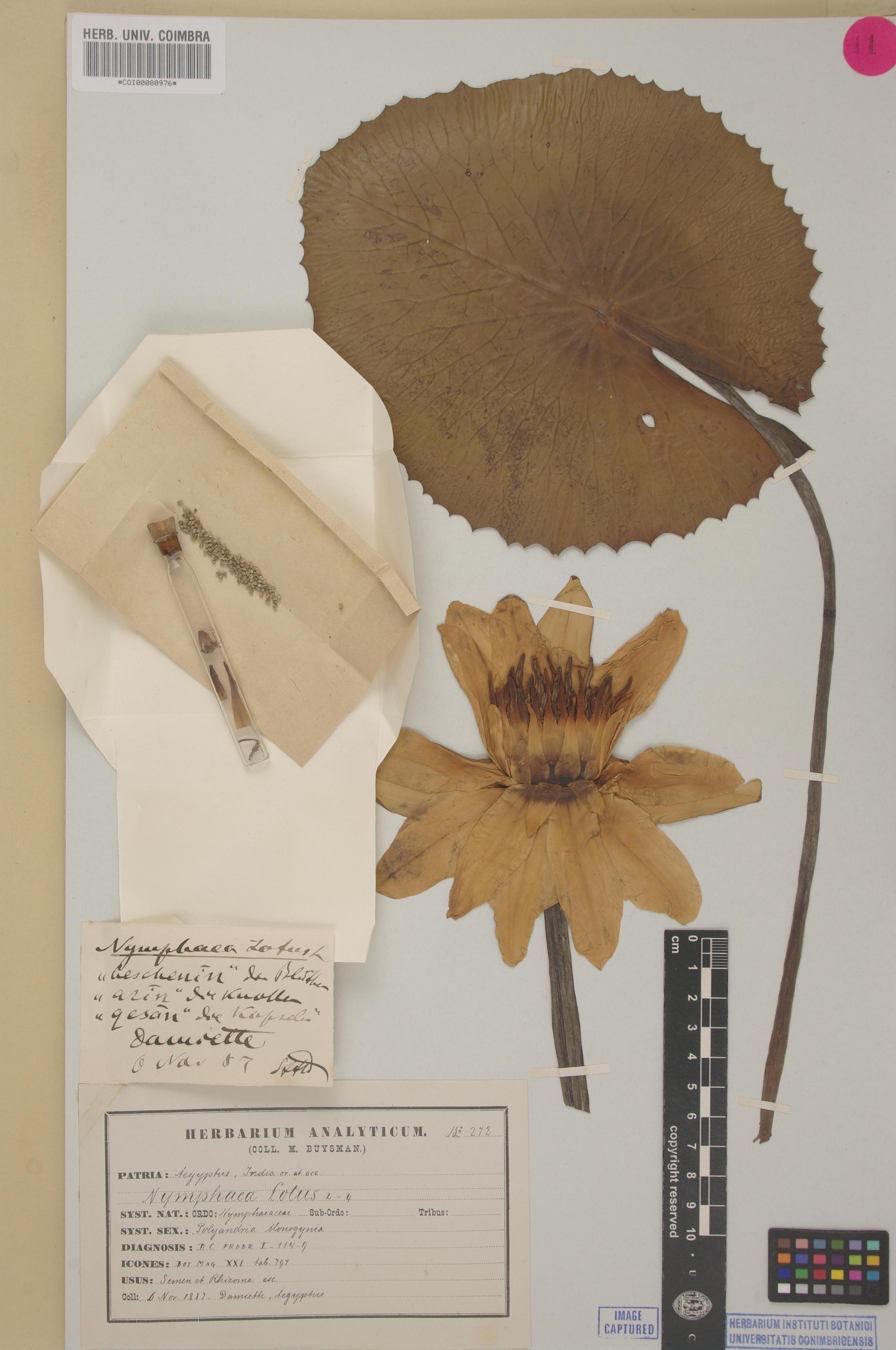
Herbarium sheet with a dried specimen of Nymphaea lotus, with a corked glass capsule containing seeds and stamens. These glass tubes are a feature of Buysman's prepared Herbarium Analyticum sheets.

Maarten Buysman, also spelt Buijsman (1856 –1919), was a Dutch botanist, known for growing, cultivating, and selling plants from across Europe, the Americas, and Indonesia. He also introduced a significant number of plants from the Americas and Europe to East Java.

== Botanical career ==
An office-clerk, by profession, at Vlissingen and Koudekerke, Buysman also founded a botanical garden. Located in the Dutch city of Middelburg, it was called the Hortus Plantarum Diaphoricarum or, in English, the Garden of Diverse Plants. This garden was run as a business, rather than as a tourist attraction. Buysman cultivated and sold plant specimens grown in the garden, under the title Herbarium Analyticum. To acquire plants which he then cultivated and went on to sell, Buysman relied on an international network of collectors from whom he received plant material from around the globe.

In 1906-1907, Buysman moved to the colonial Dutch East Indies, where he was employed at the Hotel Nongkodjadjar in the Pasuruan Regency. There, he set up an experimental garden, and continued to cultivate plants he received from foreign collectors. According to the Office of Seed and Plant Introduction, Buysman focused on growing plants at Nongkodjadjar that were hitherto unknown to the region, and appears to have been the source of some foreign species introduced to Indonesia, such as Cecropia pachystachya, Salvia tiliifolia, Cenchrus tribuloides, Elymus repens, Bromus sterilis, and Bromus erectus, although not all of these species have persisted. Backer also ascribed the presence of non-native plants when he visited Nongkodjadjar in 1925, such as Salvia tiliifolia, Calyptocarpus vialis, Melampodium perfoliatum, and Marsypianthes chamaedrys to Buysman's acclimation activities. He continued to exchange seed with other collectors, as well as selling plants to overseas buyers. He issued at least one catalogue of the plants available from the Nongkodjadjar garden in 1916.

Although Buysman never named any plant species himself, he collected the holotypes of Crepidium tenggerense (J.J.Sm.) M.A.Clem. & D.L.Jones, Hoya tenggerensis Bakh.f., Pogostemon hortensis Backer ex Adelb., and Pseudophegopteris tenggerensis Holttum,

While nothing remains of the nursery in Nongkojajar today, botanical specimens collected and distributed by Buysman are held in herbaria across the globe, including the National Herbarium of Victoria, the National Herbarium of New South Wales, the Herbarium of the University of Coimbra, Harvard University Herbaria, Brown University herbarium, the Natural History Museum, London, and the herbarium at Kew Gardens.

== Etymological legacy ==
Along with better-known botanical interests, he observed and collected insects, particularly wasps, around Lawang. Evelyn Cheesman examined a parasitic wasp collected by Buysman, and named the genus Buysmania in his honour.

== Publications ==
- M. Buijsman. 1883. De oorzaken van het klimaat in het algemeen en de klimaatsverandering in Europa in het bijzonder. Album der natuur. 32(1): 49- 60.
- M. Buysman. 1884. Het verschil tusschen kusten- en continentaal klimaat met betrekking tot den plantengroei. Album der natuur. 33(1), 346–354.
- M. Buijsman. 1898. Erythroxylon coca Lam. Album der Natuur. 47(1), 249-253.
- M. Buysman. 1899. Ipecacuanha. Album der natuur. 48(1), 121–125.
- M. Buysman. 1899. Caoutchouc. Album der natuur. 48(1), 249–252.
- M. Buysman. 1899. Zingiber officinale Roscoe. Album der natuur. 48(1), 318–320.
- M. Buysman. 1912. Botanischer Garten in Nongko Djadjar bei Lassang (Ost -Java) Flora oder Allgemeine Botanische Zeitung 104(4): 384-386.
- M. Buysman. 1912. Kultuurproeven met exotische planten. Teysmannia. 13: 176-179.
- M. Buysman. 1916. Thunbergia gibsoni S. Moore. De Tropische Natuur. 5(9), 134–136.
