= Richard Sutton (actor) =

British actor

Richard James Sutton
- Born: Birmingham, West Midlands, England
- Occupations: Actor, writer
- Known for: BBC/CBeebies Gigglebiz

Richard Sutton is a British actor.

== Career ==
Sutton became a professional actor in 2001 and was signed by the acting agency Villiers and Hudson (now Nancy Hudson Associates Ltd.) in London. He has created roles in a number of popular British television shows. Notable performances include Private Clive Tonry in the BAFTA-award-winning Dunkirk (2004), and Chris Taylor, the father of the first victim of serial killer Beverly Allitt in BBC One's The Angel of Death. Other credits include EastEnders, Doctors, Casualty, Holby City, Miranda, Come Fly with Me, Hollyoaks, Line of Duty and Dalziel & Pascoe.

His theatre credits include many seasons at the Birmingham Rep and creating the role of Dale in the world premiere of Chris O'Connell's play Tall Phoenix. In 2019, he played the role of Mike Priddle in "Ghost Stories" at the Lyric Theatre, Hammersmith before taking it to the West End for 14 weeks at the Ambassadors Theatre, London.

In late 2009, actor/writer Justin Fletcher chose him for the character of Tommy Tummy in his sketch show Gigglebiz on the BBC's pre-school channel CBeebies.

In 2012, Richard took on the role of Second Officer David Blair in the Julian Fellowes miniseries, Titanic. It was filmed in Hungary and has been sold to over 90 territories around the globe.

In 2017, he played the role of Sir James Clark Ross in AMC's 10-part TV series "The Terror".
