= Lipinia cheesmanae =

Conservation status
- Data Deficient (IUCN 3.1)

Scientific classification
- Kingdom: Animalia
- Phylum: Chordata
- Class: Reptilia
- Order: Squamata
- Family: Scincidae
- Genus: Lipinia
- Species: L. cheesmanae

Binomial name
- Lipinia cheesmanae (Parker, 1940)

Synonyms
- Lygosoma (Leiolopisma) cheesmanae Parker, 1940; Lipinia cheesmanae — Greer, 1974

Species of lizard

Lipinia cheesmanae, also known commonly as Cheesman's lipinia and Cheesman's moth skink, is a species of skink, a lizard in the family Scincidae. The species is endemic to Indonesia.

== Etymology ==
The specific name, cheesmanae (genitive, feminine), is in honor of British entomologist Lucy Evelyn Cheesman.

== Habitat ==
The preferred natural habitat of L. cheesmanae is forest, at altitudes of 100–1,000 m (330–3,280 ft).

== Reproduction ==
The mode of reproduction of L. cheesmanae is unknown.
