= Colin Campbell Garbett =

British civil servant and translator

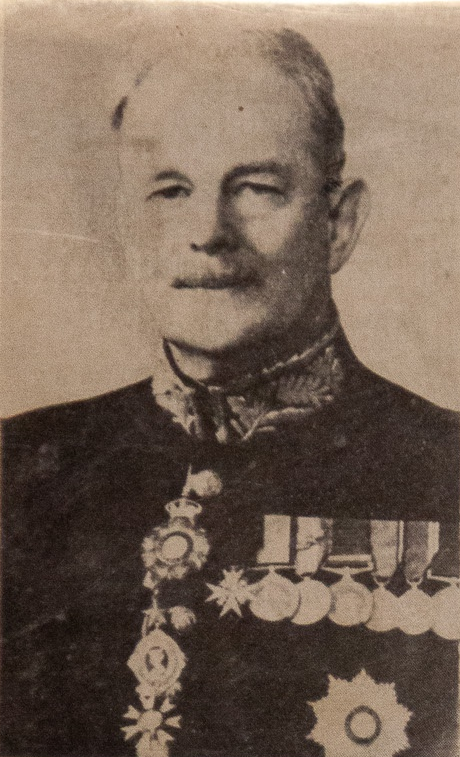
Garbett in dress uniform, from the cover of his 1956 book "Sun of Tabriz"

Sir Colin Campbell Garbett KCIE CMG CSI (22 May 1881 – 10 August 1972) was a British civil servant who worked in the colonial service in India and Iraq. He translated some Persian works including some poems of Jalaluddin Rumi.

== Early life ==
Garbett was born on 22 May 1881 in Dalhousie, India, the second son of Hubert Garbett. He was sent to school at King William's College on the Isle of Man.

== Career ==
Garbett joined the Indian Civil Service in 1905 and was initially posted to Mandi State in 1910. He became a District Judge at Simla in 1913 and then served as a postal censor in Karachi and Bombay (1915-16) before becoming a Chief Political Officer in 1916 with the Mesopotamian Expeditionary Force. He became an assistant secretary at the India Office in 1919. In 1920 he became Political Secretary to the High Commissioner and Commander-in-Chief for Iraq.

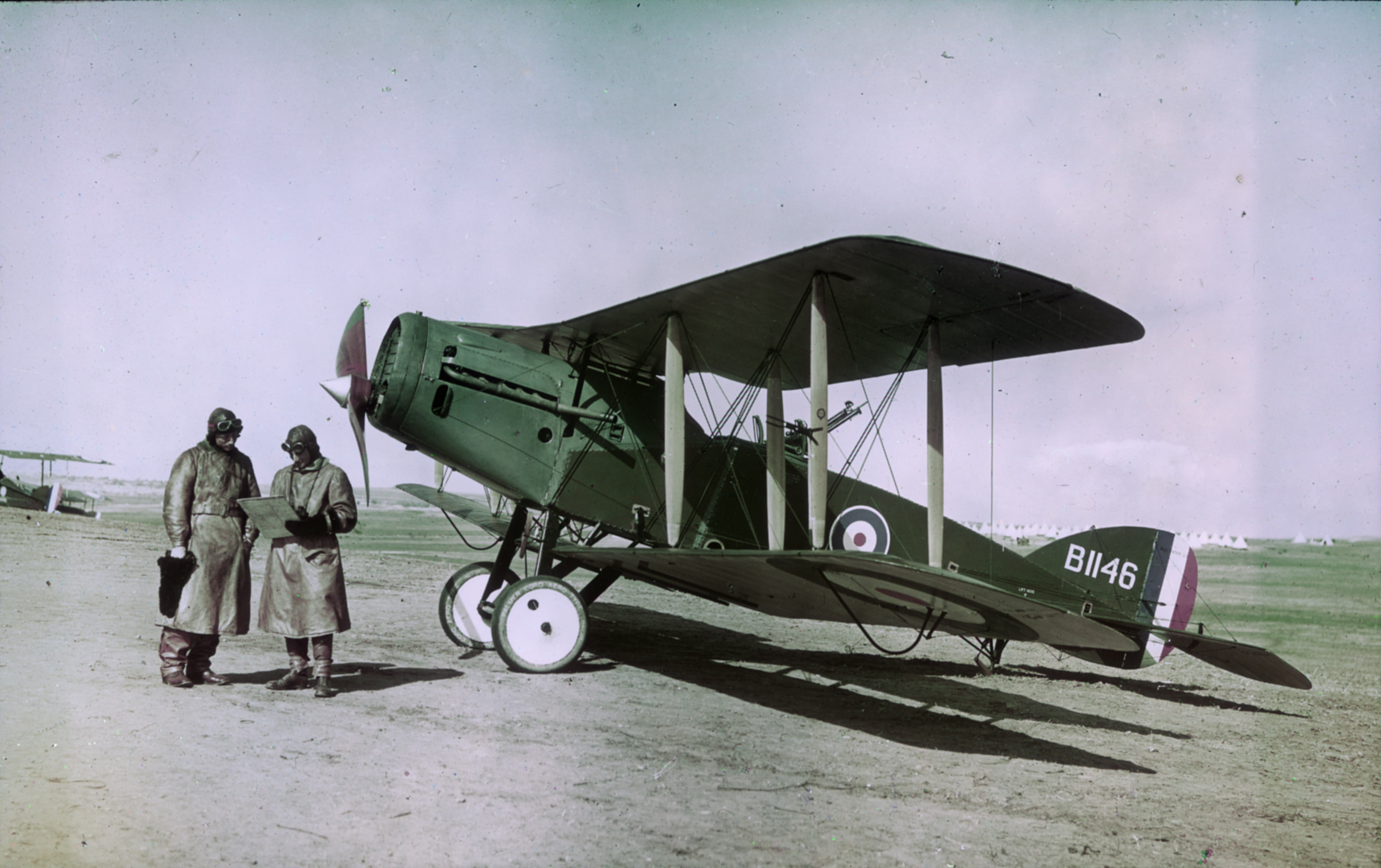
Colour Paget plate of a Bristol Fighter, similar to the one in which Garbett was injured

On 9 December 1920 the Bristol Fighter (Note: Aircraft registration: D7867) in which he was travelling to Kirkuk overturned on landing at Tauq (Note: Or Tauk; now Daquq), killing the pilot. (Note: The pilot was Robert Narcissus Essel, DFC, aged 21, of 6 Squadron, son of Colonel F.K. Essel CMG of Bevere Knoll, North Claines, Worcestershire. He was temporarily interred at Kirkuk and his body was later moved to Baghdad (North Wall) Cemetery.) Garbett survived with a broken arm.

In 1943, he wrote a book Friend of Friend based on clashes between Hindus and Muslims in the Punjab. Garbett translated some poems of Rumi as Sun of Tabriz (1956) with illustrations by Sylvia Baxter. He was deeply interested in the spiritual teachings of Baba Sawan Singh and took an interest in Surat Shabd Yoga. He also wrote on the teachings of the sect in The Ringing Radiance (1967).

== Honours ==
Garbett was made a Companion of the Order of the Indian Empire (CIE) in 1918 "in recognition of meritorious services rendered in connection with military operations in Mesopotamia." He was made a Companion of the Order of St Michael and St George (CMG) in the 1922 Birthday Honours, and a Companion of the Order of the Star of India (CSI) in the 1935 Birthday Honours.

In June 1938, for his work during the Quetta Earthquake of 1935, he was appointed an Officer of the Order of St. John (OStJ). He was elevated within the Order of the Indian Empire and made a Knight Commander (KCIE) in the 1941 Birthday Honours. He was also mentioned in dispatches on three occasions.

== Personal life ==
Garbett married twice; his first wife died, and on 20 January 1919 he married Marjorie Maynard, ten years his junior, in the Bengal Presidency. They had at least one child, daughter, Susan. The couple were later estranged. (Note: After the estrangement, Susan lived and farmed with her mother; see Marjorie Maynard.)

In 1913, he was listed a member of The Folklore Society. From 1919, he was a Fellow of the Royal Geographical Society.

He retired in 1950 and settled in South Africa. A freemason, he was an honorary member of Melrose Lodge in Johannesburg from 1957. (Note: Until 1977, South African Freemasons were exclusively a white organization; see Freemasonry in South Africa.) He died on 10 August 1972 and was cremated.

== Posthumous ==
In the 1970s, probably following clearance of his wife's house after her death, an urn containing his ashes was found at a recycling centre in Surrey, discarded in a waste skip. They were subsequently returned to the family when the undertaker who had handled the funeral of his daughter Susan in 2004 saw a newspaper story about them, and were then interred at a London crematorium alongside those of Susan.
