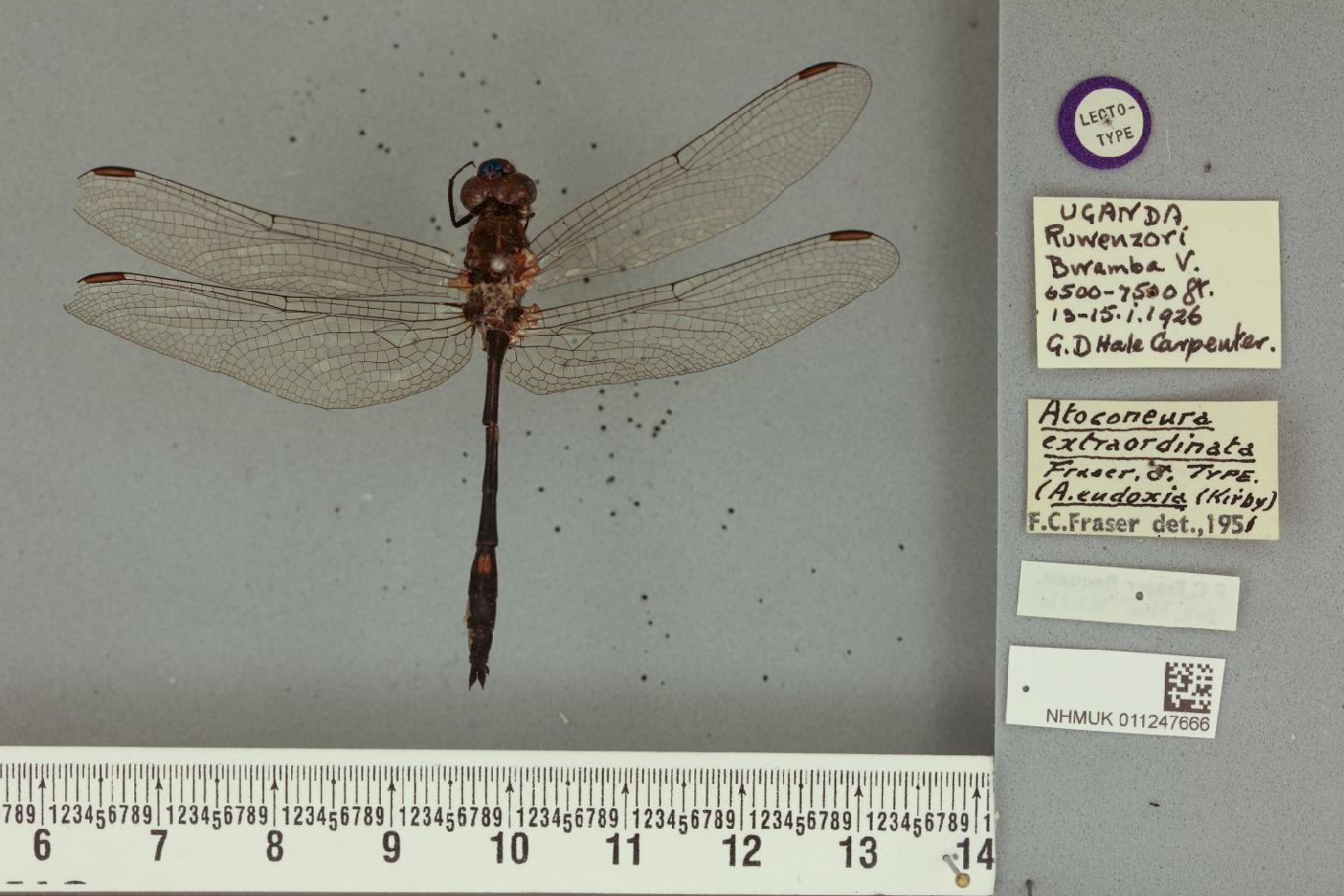

Conservation status
- Least Concern (IUCN 3.1)

Scientific classification
- Kingdom: Animalia
- Phylum: Arthropoda
- Clade: Pancrustacea
- Class: Insecta
- Order: Odonata
- Infraorder: Anisoptera
- Family: Libellulidae
- Genus: Atoconeura
- Species: A. eudoxia

Binomial name
- Atoconeura eudoxia (Kirby, 1908)

= Atoconeura eudoxia =

Species of dragonfly

Atoconeura eudoxia, the fishtail highlander, is a species of dragonfly in the family Libellulidae. It is native to Kenya and Uganda. It may also occur in adjacent nations. It lives in rainforests, occupying streamside habitat.
