= David Blair (mariner) =

British mariner (1874–1955)

Commander David Blair OBE RD RNR
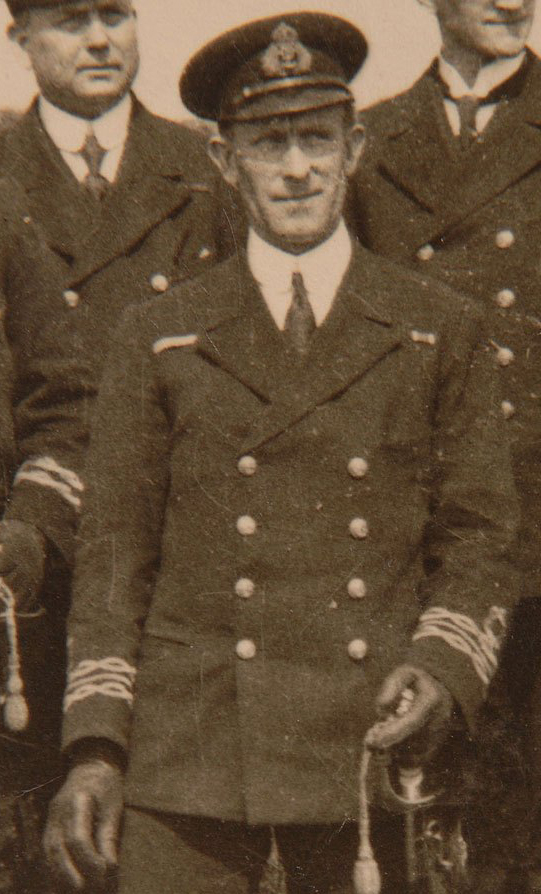
- Blair during World War I
- Born: 11 November 1874; Newport, Isle of Wight, United Kingdom
- Died: 10 January 1955 (aged 80); Hendon, Middlesex, England
- Other name: Davy
- Occupation: Merchant seaman
- Spouses: Madeline Temple Mackness (m. 1905; died 1950); Vera Mabel Crump (m. 1950)
- Children: 1
- Military career
- Allegiance: United Kingdom
- Branch: Royal Naval Reserve
- Rank: Commander
- Conflicts: World War I
- Awards: Order of the British Empire (military division); Victory Medal; 1914–15 Star; Reserve Decoration; Legion of Honour

Commander David Blair OBE RD RNR (11 November 1874 – 10 January 1955) was a British merchant seaman with the White Star Line. Initially assigned as the Second Officer on the RMS Titanic, he was reassigned in a last-minute reshuffle of the senior officers before her maiden voyage.

Blair became best known for taking the key to a storage locker, erroneously believed to contain the binoculars intended for use by the crow's nest lookouts, during his departure from the ship at Southampton after the reshuffle, an incident which became a point of investigation at the subsequent inquiries into the ship's sinking.

During the First World War, Blair was involved in another ship's incident where HMS Oceanic, formerly the RMS Oceanic, was run aground during his watch and sunk off the coast of Scotland during the early months of World War 1. He was subsequently court-martialled for the incident.

== Titanic posting and rearrangement ==
Blair was originally appointed the second officer of Titanic. He had been with the ship during her sea trials in Belfast, and the delivery trip from Belfast to Southampton.

The White Star Line, however, decided that RMS Olympic's Chief Officer, Henry Wilde, should temporarily take that position on Titanic due to his experience on Titanic's sister ship which most of Titanic's officers did not have. Chief Officer William Murdoch and First Officer Charles Lightoller were consequently each demoted one rank, and Blair was removed from the officer line-up. Blair wrote about the disappointment of losing his position on Titanic in a postcard to his sister-in-law days before the ship left for Southampton, remarking, "This is a magnificent ship, I feel very disappointed I am not to make her first voyage."

=== Key controversy ===
When Blair left Titanic on 9 April 1912, he took with him the key to the crow's nest locker, presumably inadvertently. This is often given as a reason why there were no binoculars available to the lookouts during the voyage. However, contrary to belief, binoculars were not in the locker as it contained the crow's nest telephone which was left open. Additionally, Blair had lent the lookouts his own binoculars – senior officers each had their own pair – during the delivery trip and, when he left the ship, it is highly likely that the binoculars were left behind in the cabin which was subsequently occupied by the new Second Officer, Lightoller who kept them for his own use.

The possibility of no binoculars in the crow's nest being a factor in the sinking of Titanic became a point of investigation in the subsequent inquiries into the sinking. The lookout on watch at the time of the collision, Frederick Fleet, the man who had spotted the iceberg, maintained during the inquiries that they were informed they were to have no binoculars during the voyage and that if had he had a pair, he would have spotted the iceberg sooner. However, in the same testimony, Fleet stated that he would use his naked eye to spot objects at a distance and alert the officer on watch with the crow's nest bell. Lightoller went a step further and said that binoculars were used to identify objects, not to spot them, and that they were detrimental to lookouts as they reduced their vision.

== Later events ==
Blair was First Officer on the SS Majestic in 1913 when a coaler jumped overboard; the night before, a fellow crew member had succeeded in drowning himself. While a lifeboat was organized, Blair jumped into the ocean waters and swam toward the man, who was now swimming for the ship. Though the boat reached the man first, Blair was commended for his action in The New York Times and received money from the passengers and a medal from the Royal Humane Society.

Both Blair and Charles Lightoller, who had survived the Titanic disaster, were serving aboard HMS Oceanic, a transatlantic liner refitted for war-time use, when she ran aground off the coast of Scotland in 1914. As the navigator at the time of the incident, Blair was blamed for the grounding and found at fault at the subsequent court-martial.

He captained the SY St George during its expedition to the South Pacific in 1924–25.

== Personal life ==
Born in Newport, Isle of Wight, Blair grew up in Scotland and, during his adult life, lived in Broughty Ferry. His father was Lt. Col. John Blair and his mother was Clementina Ross Stewart.

Blair was married twice. His first marriage was to Madeline Temple Mackness with whom he had a daughter, Elizabeth. Madeleine died in 1950 and, soon after, Blair remarried to Vera Mabel Crump. Blair died on 10 January 1955 in Hendon, Middlesex, and was survived by his daughter and second wife.

== Legacy ==
Blair was depicted in the 2012 miniseries Titanic by actor Richard Sutton.

A key was donated by Blair's daughter to the International Sailors Society which she claimed was the key which he took with him when he left the ship. On 22 September 2007, it was sold in a group of items including a postcard Blair wrote on board Titanic via an auction held by Henry Aldridge, including a ticket from Belfast that fetched £32,000 and a postcard sent by a passenger which sold for £17,000. The key was purchased by Shen Dongjun, the CEO of jewellery retailer TESIRO's Chinese division for £90,000, and was put on display in Nanjing.
