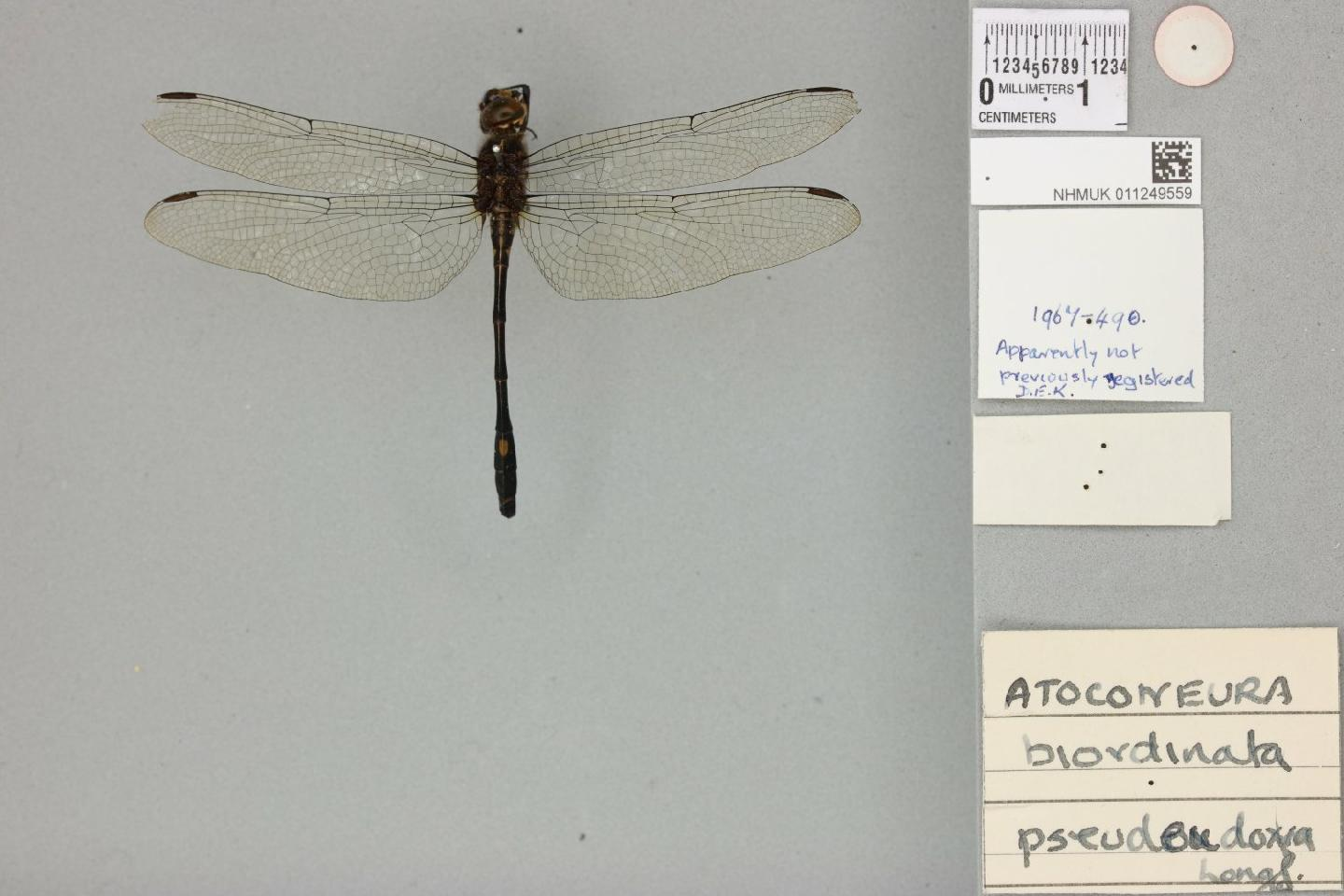
- Atoconeura pseudeudoxia

Scientific classification
- Kingdom: Animalia
- Phylum: Arthropoda
- Clade: Pancrustacea
- Class: Insecta
- Order: Odonata
- Infraorder: Anisoptera
- Family: Libellulidae
- Subfamily: Trithemistinae
- Genus: Atoconeura; Karsch, 1899

Species
- 6, see text

= Atoconeura =

Genus of dragonflies

Atoconeura, commonly known as highlanders, is a genus of dragonflies in the family Libellulidae.

These dragonflies are generally about 28 to 39 millimeters long and are shiny black with yellow markings. They are native to Africa, where they are usually found along fast-flowing rivers in forested habitat at some elevation. The genus has likely been isolated in higher-altitude habitat, and most of the species are limited to highlands.

Species include:

- Atoconeura aethiopica Kimmins, 1958 – Ethiopian highlander
- Atoconeura biordinata Karsch, 1899 – common highlander
- Atoconeura eudoxia (Kirby, 1909) – fishtail highlander
- Atoconeura kenya Longfield, 1953 – Kenyan highlander
- Atoconeura luxata Dijkstra, 2006 – western highlander
- Atoconeura pseudeudoxia Longfield, 1953 – hairy-legged highlander
