= Micromacromia camerunica =

Conservation status
- Least Concern (IUCN 3.1)

Scientific classification
- Kingdom: Animalia
- Phylum: Arthropoda
- Class: Insecta
- Order: Odonata
- Infraorder: Anisoptera
- Family: Libellulidae
- Genus: Micromacromia
- Species: M. camerunica

Binomial name
- Micromacromia camerunica Karsch, 1890

Species of dragonfly

Micromacromia camerunica is a species of dragonfly in the family Libellulidae. It is found in Cameroon, the Democratic Republic of the Congo, Ivory Coast, Equatorial Guinea, Guinea, Kenya, Liberia, Nigeria, Sierra Leone, and Uganda. Its natural habitats are subtropical or tropical moist lowland forests and rivers.
