= Marjorie Maynard =

British illustrator and farmer

- Born: 23 January 1891
- Died: 23 October 1975
- Other name: Marjorie Josephine Garbett
- Occupations: Illustrator, farmer
- Spouse: Colin Campbell Garbett

Marjorie Josephine Maynard, Lady Garbett (23 January 1891 – 23 October 1975) was a British artist and farmer who designed some of the first set of postage stamps issued in Iraq. In later life, she brought and lost a high-profile court case after being evicted from her farmstead.

== Early life ==
Maynard's poem, "Laverstock Downs", and one of her cartoons, were published in Indian Ink in 1917 in aid of the Imperial Indian War Fund. The cartoon depicting Belgium as a widow whose children have been killed by Germany, was praised by Pothan Joseph in an article in East And West magazine. (Note: Joseph describes the image as being in the style of Louis Raemaekers and depicting "Belgium as a widow clothed in the tatters of torment and holding the scourge in the attitude of a wide sweep— crying 'For my children/ Whom thou hast killed,/ Tortured and enslaved—/ Thou shall have bitter scourging./ GERMANY'", the quotation being the caption in the original.)

== Stamp designs ==
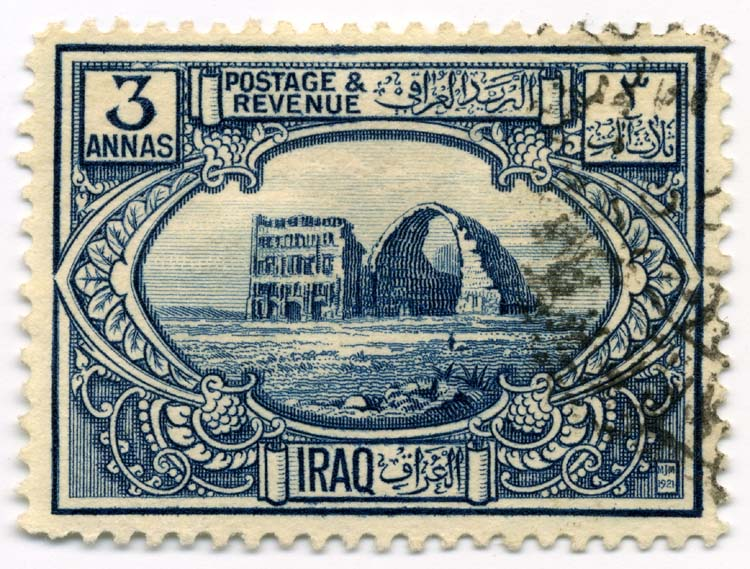
Three annas stamp designed by Maynard, depicting the ruins of the Kasra arch in Ctesiphon

With Edith Cheesman, Maynard was the designer of the first postage stamps issued by Iraq (then known as the Kingdom of Iraq under British Administration, as established in 1921), depicting historic Iraqi art and architecture. Her designs were signed "MJM 1921", although the stamps were not issued until 1923. The definitive stamps were denominated in the currency of the Administration, the Indian anna and rupee, and Maynard designed four of them: the 1½A (depicting a winged figure), 2A (a Babylonian wall-sculpture), 3A (ruins of the Kasra arch in Ctesiphon) and 1R (an allegory of the date palm, Phoenix dactylifera) values. (Note: Cheesman designed the 0.5A, 1A, 4A, 6A, 8A, 2R, 5R and 10R stamps.) They were inscribed "IRAQ" and "POSTAGE & REVENUE" in English and Arabic.

The 1 rupee stamp was withdrawn on 1 June 1927 and replaced by one showing a portrait of King Faisal I, but the rest remained on sale until the introduction of a new set on 17 February 1931 and were still used postally after that. Both Cheesman and Maynard appear to have been amateur artists.

== Farming career ==
Maynard purchased the 160-acre (65 ha) Horeham Manor Farm (Note: Now known as Horam Manor Farm; see https://horammanorfarm.co.uk/) and its farmhouse, an Elizabethan manor house, at Horam in East Sussex, in 1949, for £12,500. She worked the farm under her maiden name, with her daughter, Susan, attempting to do so despite having limited experience and using hired contractors with no manager to oversee them. The resultant poor farming standards led to multiple interventions by her local County Agricultural Executive Committee, starting in 1950, culminating with the farm being taken into government control in February 1956 through a "dispossession order" under powers conferred by the 1947 Agriculture Act.

In order to allow a tenant to be appointed and to then move in and run the farm, the pair were evicted from the farmhouse in May 1956. This eviction was subsequently the subject of questions in Parliament from several MPs, put to the Minister of Agriculture, Fisheries and Food, Derick Heathcoat-Amory, as well as television coverage. Her High Court case, before the Lord Chief Justice (Lord Goddard), Mr Justice Cassells and Mr Justice Lynskey, attempting to have the dispossession declared illegal, was dismissed on 30 January 1957, and she sold the farm at auction in July that year.

== Personal life ==
Maynard married Colin Campbell Garbett, CIE, a widower, in the Bengal Presidency on 20 January 1919. He was then in the Colonial Civil Service in India and, from 1920 to 1922, worked as Secretary to the High Commissioner of Iraq, then as Deputy Commissioner and later Commissioner.

His appointment in the 1941 Birthday Honours as a Knight Commander of the Most Eminent Order of the Indian Empire entitled her to use the title "Lady". They were later estranged.

Marjorie Maynard, Lady Garbett, died on 23 October 1975.
