= Edith Cheesman =

British artist

Florence Edith Cheesman (1877–1964) was a British artist and author, noted for her watercolours of Arabian birdlife and for producing a series of Iraqi postage stamps and postcards featuring wildlife.

== Life and career ==
Florence Edith Cheesman was born in 1877 at Wistwal in Kent. She was one of the five children of Florence Maud Tassell (d. 1944) and Robert Cheesman (d. 1915), a gentleman farmer of modest means. She and her siblings received their early education from a governess. Later, Edith and her sister, Evelyn Cheesman, attended a school in Brighton run by the Misses Collingwood. There, they acquired a grounding in French and German. Both sisters became governesses, Edith in Surrey and Evelyn in the Midlands. Her sister, Evelyn Cheesman was a noted entomologist and prolific author.

Her brother was Colonel Robert Ernest Cheesman, a British a military officer, explorer, author and ornithologist. The British entomologist and traveller Evelyn Cheesman was her younger sister. She spent considerable time abroad, accompanying her brother on his various missions. In the early 1920s, her brother served as the Private Secretary to Sir Percy Cox during his term as the High Commissioner of Iraq. There Edith became acquainted with Gertrude Bell and began painting portraits and scenes of Iraqi life, including a portrait of King Faisal I (1921), Gertrude Bell’s house in Baghdad (1921) and Hassan Sagarr (or Hassan of the Hawks (1921) as well as streetscapes and other works.

Following the British occupation of Iraq, the English showed a great deal of interest in learning more about the land. Cheesman’s paintings and sketches of Mesopotamia became very popular, were exhibited in a number of London galleries and were the subject of a number of very positive reviews. In 1922, P.G. Konody, writing in the Daily Mail, expressed the hope that Cheesman’s “picturesque views of Mesopotamia” would not be used as propaganda to support Britain’s continued occupation of the land. In 1923, she published her impressions of Mesopotamia in a book simply titled, Mesopotamia (Iraq) in Water Colours.

She visited South Africa in about 1918, and returned there, living the latter part of her life in Natal in the Valley of a Thousand Hills, near Botha's Hill. In 1924, she was commissioned by the Gold Coast Government to produce a series of watercolours for the Empire Exhibition at Wembley. These were published as Tuck's 'Oilette' Postcards of the Gold Coast.

During her time in South Africa, she maintained diaries of her travels. She may have intended to publish these. A manuscript entitled Roaming round Rhodesia with a paint-box: off the beaten track, well-illustrated with original sketches and paintings, and many photographs, is now part of the Campbell Collections at the University of KwaZulu-Natal.

Several of her works are in the UK's Government Art Collection, including an oil on canvas of Gertrude Bell's House in Baghdad, which hangs in the British Embassy in Baghdad.

== Postage stamp designs ==
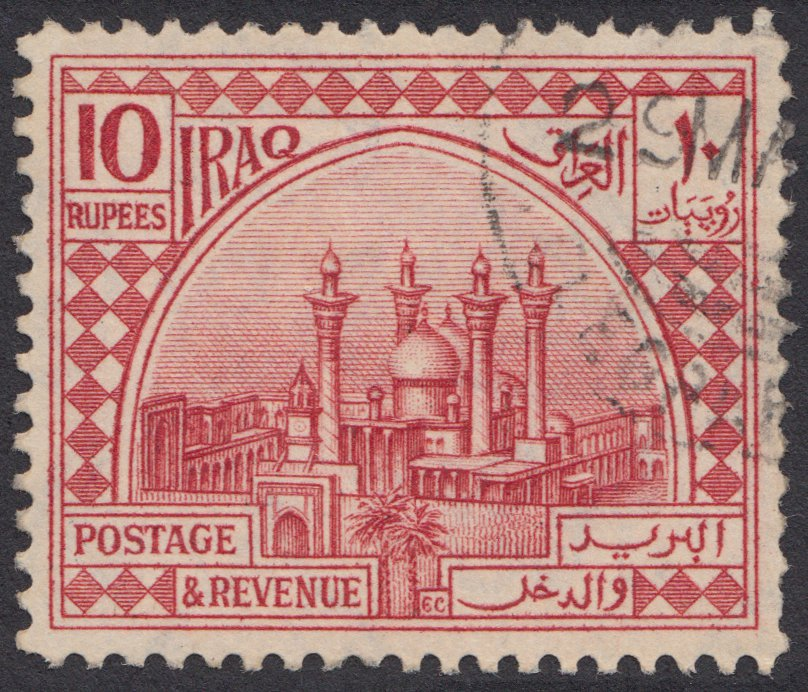
10 rupee definitive Iraq postage stamp designed by Cheesman and issued in 1923

With Marjorie Maynard, Cheesman was the designer of the first postage stamps issued by Iraq (then known as the Kingdom of Iraq under British Administration, as established in 1921), depicting historic Iraqi art and architecture. The stamps were not issued until 1923. The definitive stamps were denominated in the currency of the Administration, the Indian anna and rupee, and Cheesman designed the 0.5A, 1A, 4A, 6A, 8A, 2R, 5R and 10R values. They were inscribed "IRAQ" and "POSTAGE & REVENUE" in English and Arabic. Most remained on sale until the introduction of a new set on 17 February 1931, and were used postally after that.

== Legacy ==
Her brother, a keen amateur ornithologist, named a sub-species of bird in honour of his sister, Edith Cheesman.

== Exhibitions ==
- Jul‒Aug 8, 1908 The London Salon of the Allied Artists' Association. 1st year London Royal Albert Hall

== Selected works ==
- Faisal I (1885 –1933) King of Iraq, [portrait],1921, Government Art Collection, Oil on canvas, 69 x 51 cm.12.
- Hassan Sagarr (or Hassan of the Hawks), 1921, Government Art Collection, Oil on canvas, 69.3 x 41.2 cm
- Gertrude Bell’s House in Baghdad, 1921, Government Art Collection, Oil, 30.5 x 41 cm.
- A Street in Kut (General Townshend’s House), 1921, Watercolour,
- New Street, Baghdad, 1921, Watercolour
- A Street in Baghdad,1921, Watercolour
- The Arch of Ctesiphon,1921, Watercolour

=== Postcards ===
- A Government Officer’s Bungalow, Gold Coast,1923–24, [Postcard],
- African Drummer, [Postcard], 1923-24
- An Ashanti Priest, Gold Coast. [Postcard]. 1923-24
- Ashanti Potters, [Postcard], 1923-24
- The Carpenters’ Shop, Kibbi Trade School, Gold Coast, 1923–24, [Postcard],
- Boys on Parade, Kibbi Trade School, Gold Coast, 1923–24, [Postcard],
- Koforidua Station, Gold Coast, 1923 –24
- A Ward in the Hospital for Africans, Accra, Gold Coast, 1923–24, [Postcard],
- A Native Court at the Gold Coast [Postcard],
- Loading Cocoa into Surf Boats, Accra, Gold Coast, 1923 –24 [Postcard],
- A Palaver of Chiefs, Accra, Gold Coast, [Postcard], 1923 –24,
- A Manganese Mine at the Gold Coast,
