= Robert Ernest Cheesman =

British officer and explorer (1878-1962)

Major Robert Ernest Cheesman CBE (1878, Ashford, Kent – 13 February 1962) was an English military officer, explorer, ornithologist and author. He is noted for being one of the first to map the Arabian coast and credited with the discovery of a rodent, named after him, Cheesman's gerbil (Gerbillus cheesmani).

== Life and career ==
He was one of the five children of Florence Maud Tassell (d. 1944) and Robert Cheesman (d. 1915), a gentleman farmer of modest means. Cheesman was Private Secretary to Sir Percy Cox during his tenure as High Commissioner in Iraq.

In 1923, during a journey into the Arabian Peninsula, Cheesman collected over 300 specimens from the Al-Ahsa Oasis, several of them previously unknown to science. These specimens are currently in the British Museum. During this period, he was accompanied by his sister, Evelyn Cheesman, a noted entomologist, painter and prolific author. He is credited with discovering Cheesman's gerbil (Gerbillus cheesmani).

Cheesman was the first man to map the Arabian coast from the Gulf of Salwah to Uqair. In 1924 he fixed the position of Hofuf and identified the site of ancient Gerrha. He presented his findings to Ibn Sa'ud at his court in Hofuf. He was later given the Gill Memorial Award for this work by the Royal Geographical Society.

In 1936 he was awarded the Patron's Medal of the society for his explorations and surveys of the Blue Nile and Lake Tana.

== Family ==
His sister Evelyn Cheesman was a noted entomologist and traveller. Another sister was Edith Cheesman, a notable artist who exhibited and published a series of sketches and paintings of Iraq.

== Publications ==
- 'Report on a collection of mammals made by Col. J.E.B. Hotson in Shiraz, Persia', Journal of the Bombay Natural History Society, vol. 27, no. 3, pp. 573–581.
- Unknown Arabia, R. E. Cheesman. London, Macmillan & Co., 1926
