= Atoconeura biordinata =

Conservation status
- Least Concern (IUCN 3.1)

Scientific classification
- Kingdom: Animalia
- Phylum: Arthropoda
- Clade: Pancrustacea
- Class: Insecta
- Order: Odonata
- Infraorder: Anisoptera
- Family: Libellulidae
- Genus: Atoconeura
- Species: A. biordinata

Binomial name
- Atoconeura biordinata Karsch, 1899

Species of dragonfly

Atoconeura biordinata, the common highlander, is a species of dragonfly in the family Libellulidae. It is native to southeastern Africa, where it occurs in the Democratic Republic of the Congo, Kenya, Malawi, Mozambique, Tanzania, Zambia, and Zimbabwe. It is a common species of the highlands, where it lives near forest streams.
