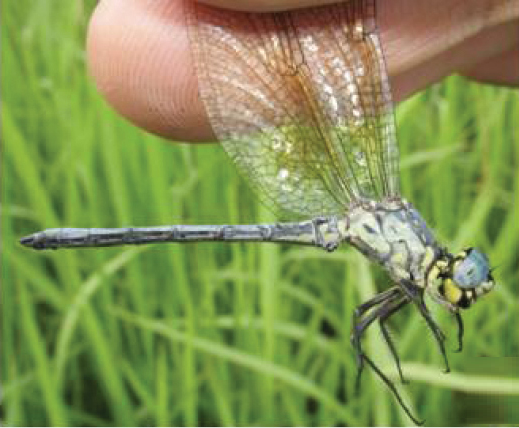
- Micromacromia flava

Scientific classification
- Kingdom: Animalia
- Phylum: Arthropoda
- Clade: Pancrustacea
- Class: Insecta
- Order: Odonata
- Infraorder: Anisoptera
- Family: Libellulidae
- Genus: Micromacromia; Karsch, 1890

= Micromacromia =

Genus of dragonflies

Micromacromia, sometimes known as micmacs, is a genus of dragonflies in the family Libellulidae.

The genus contains the following species:

- Micromacromia camerunica Karsch, 1890 - Large Micmac, widespread in central Africa
- Micromacromia flava (Longfield, 1947), Angola
- Micromacromia miraculosa (Förster, 1906), Tanzania
- Micromacromia zygoptera (Ris, 1909) - Small Micmac, widespread in west Africa
