= Atoconeura aethiopica =

Conservation status
- Vulnerable (IUCN 3.1)

Scientific classification
- Kingdom: Animalia
- Phylum: Arthropoda
- Clade: Pancrustacea
- Class: Insecta
- Order: Odonata
- Infraorder: Anisoptera
- Family: Libellulidae
- Genus: Atoconeura
- Species: A. aethiopica

Binomial name
- Atoconeura aethiopica Kimmins, 1958

Species of dragonfly

Atoconeura aethiopica, the Ethiopian highlander, is a species of dragonfly in the family Libellulidae. It is endemic to Ethiopia. It is limited to clear mountain streams in forested habitat. This habitat type is being degraded, so the species is considered to be vulnerable.
