= Micromacromia miraculosa =

Conservation status
- Critically Endangered (IUCN 3.1)

Scientific classification
- Kingdom: Animalia
- Phylum: Arthropoda
- Class: Insecta
- Order: Odonata
- Infraorder: Anisoptera
- Family: Libellulidae
- Genus: Micromacromia
- Species: M. miraculosa

Binomial name
- Micromacromia miraculosa (Förster, 1906)

Species of dragonfly

Micromacromia miraculosa is a species of dragonfly in the family Libellulidae. It is endemic to Tanzania. Its natural habitats are subtropical or tropical moist lowland forests and rivers. It is threatened by habitat loss.
