= St George expedition to the South Pacific =

Scientific exploration in the South Pacific

- Start: Dartmouth; 9 April 1924
- Participants: Evelyn Cheesman; Cynthia Longfield; Cyril Leslie Collenette; James Hornell; Cyril Crossland; Lawrence Athelstan Molesworth Riley; Lawrence John Chubb; Harry Joseph Kelsall

The St George expedition to the South Pacific took place over the period 1924-1925 and was sponsored by the Scientific Expeditionary Research Association. The objective was a partial replication of Darwin’s famous journey to the South Sea.

== Logistics ==
The expedition set out from Dartmouth harbour on 9 April 1924. The vessel, the SY St George, was a 1000 tonne sailing yacht equipped with a laboratory and dark rooms and was captained by David Blair, who had sailed with the Titanic on its sea trials but had been transferred from the crew just before its fateful voyage. The expedition's Scientific Director was James Hornell and the others on board included a mix of scientists and tourists with divergent aims and interests.

The cruise sailed to Madeira, crossed the Atlantic, landing at Trinidad and Tobago and from there sailed down the Panama Canal into the Pacific Ocean. In the Pacific they called into the Galapagos, the Marquesas, the Society Islands and Easter Island before returning to Panama and recrossing the Atlantic to arrive in the UK in returning October 1925.

== Scientific members of the expedition ==
The team of naturalists included:

- James Hornell (ethnologist)
- Cyril Crossland (marine zoologist)
- Cynthia Longfield (coleopterist, lepidopterist)
- Evelyn Cheesman (entomologist)
- L.A.M Riley (botanist)
- Lawrence John Chubb (1887–1971) (geologist)
- Cyril Leslie Collenette (1888–1959) (coleopterist, lepidopterist)
- Col. Harry Joseph Kelsall (1867–1950) (ornithologist)
- P. H. Johnson (zoologist)

== Science ==
Due to ill-health Riley left the expedition in Panama and returned from there to the UK. After Riley's departure the additional responsibility of collecting and preserving plant specimens was taken on by Longfield, Collenette and Cheesman. Cheesman considered the expedition to be disorganised, and left the expedition in Tahiti, along with Crossland.

Although Hornell's records and collections from the Marquesas Islands have subsequently been seen as a "missed opportunity", after the expedition's return to the UK a number of other scientists worked on a variety of samples collected during the voyage. These included work by Edward Bagnall Poulton and Norman Denbigh Riley on butterflies and work on various moths. John Read le Brockton Tomlin reported on molluscs collected, and Frederick Wallace Edwards worked on nematocera (a group of flies). A number of scientists studied material collected by Crossland including various crabs which were worked on by Susan Finnegan, bryozoa which were worked on by Anna Birchall Hastings and polychaetes.
