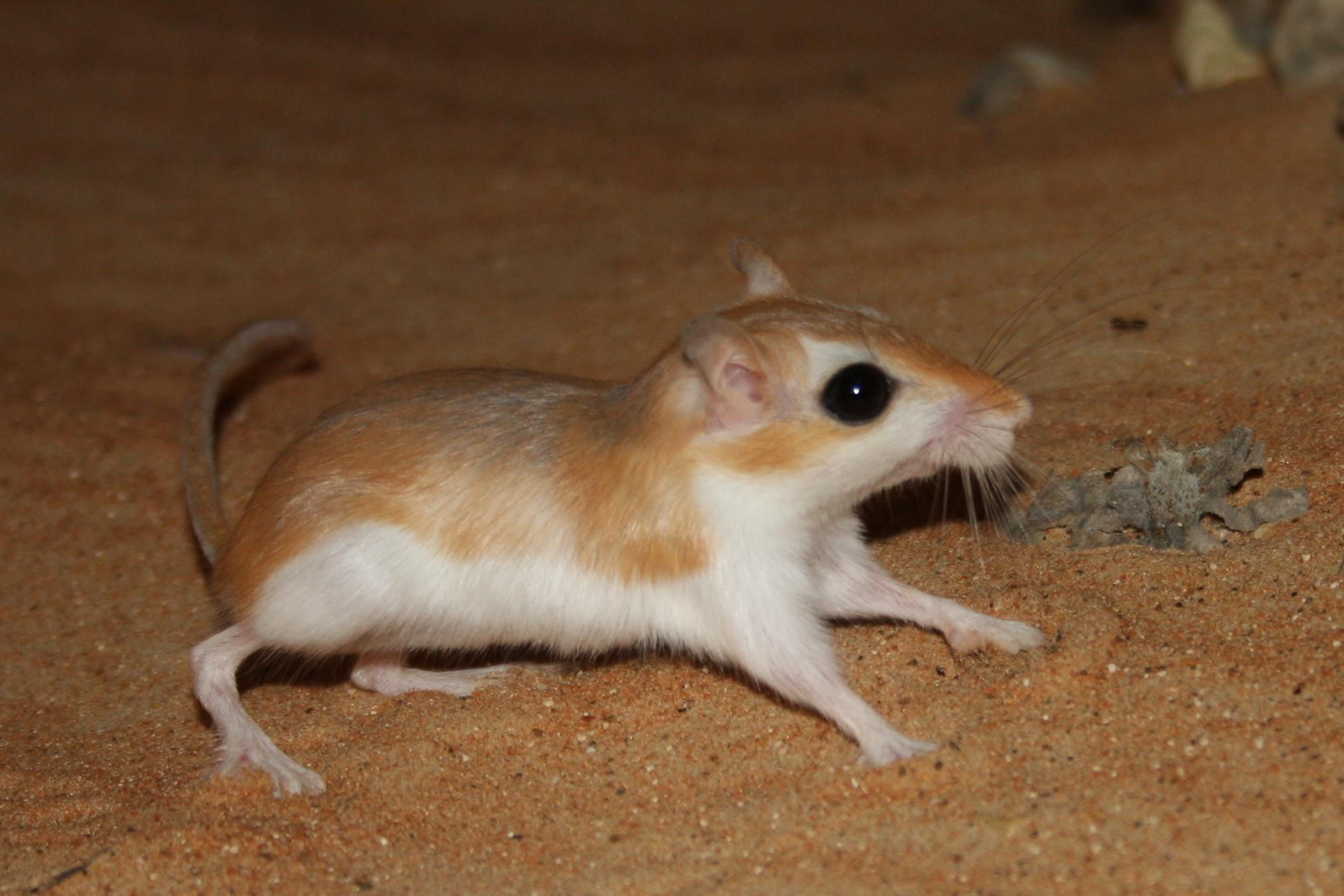

Conservation status
- Least Concern (IUCN 3.1)

Scientific classification
- Kingdom: Animalia
- Phylum: Chordata
- Class: Mammalia
- Order: Rodentia
- Family: Muridae
- Genus: Gerbillus
- Species: G. cheesmani

Binomial name
- Gerbillus cheesmani Thomas, 1919

= Cheesman's gerbil =

Species of rodent

Cheesman's gerbil (Gerbillus cheesmani) is a small rodent in the subfamily Gerbillinae of the family Muridae. It is distributed mainly in Arabian Peninsula to southwestern Iran. It has orange-brown fur, white underparts, large eyes and a very long tail.

== Taxonomy ==
Cheesman's gerbil was first described by the British zoologist Oldfield Thomas in 1919. It was named in honour of its discoverer, the British military officer, explorer and ornithologist Robert Ernest Cheesman who collected it while on an exploratory expedition in Saudi Arabia.

== Description ==
This gerbil is similar in appearance to the lesser Egyptian gerbil (Gerbillus gerbillus) and Anderson's gerbil (Gerbillus andersoni). It has a head-and-body length of between 70 and 110 mm (2.8 and 4.3 in) and a tail of between 90 and 135 mm (3.5 and 5.3 in), and like them, the soles of the feet are hairy. The dorsal pelage is orange-brown and the underparts are white.

== Distribution and habitat ==
Cheesman's gerbil is native to the Arabian Peninsula and the Middle East. Its range includes Saudi Arabia, United Arab Emirates, Oman, Yemen, Kuwait, Iraq, Iran, Syria and Jordan. Its natural habitat is arid plains with sandy soils, deserts and sabkha, flat coastal salt pans. it is often found in areas in which Haloxylon, Calligonum, Ephedra alata and Artemisia grow.

== Ecology ==
This is a nocturnal species, spending the heat of the day in a burrow and emerging at night to forage for seeds and grasses, although it may become omnivorous in some circumstances. The hair on the soles of the feet is one adaptation it has for running across sand, and it can also make long leaps. By feeding at night it is able to make use of the dew on plants and it can conserve moisture by producing dry faeces and very little urine. It carries damp vegetation to its burrow which raises the humidity level inside. The burrow entrance is often at the base of a shrubby plant, and the gerbil closes the entrance when it enters by flicking sand across with its tail. It is preyed on by predators such as owls, the Arabian red fox and Rüppell's fox.

== Status ==
G. cheesmani is a common species, has a wide range and is presumed to have a large total population. The population trend seems to be stable and no particular threats to the animal have been identified. The International Union for Conservation of Nature has assessed its conservation status as being of "least concern".
