= Taq Kasra =

Persian archeological site in Iraq

- طاق كسرى (Arabic)
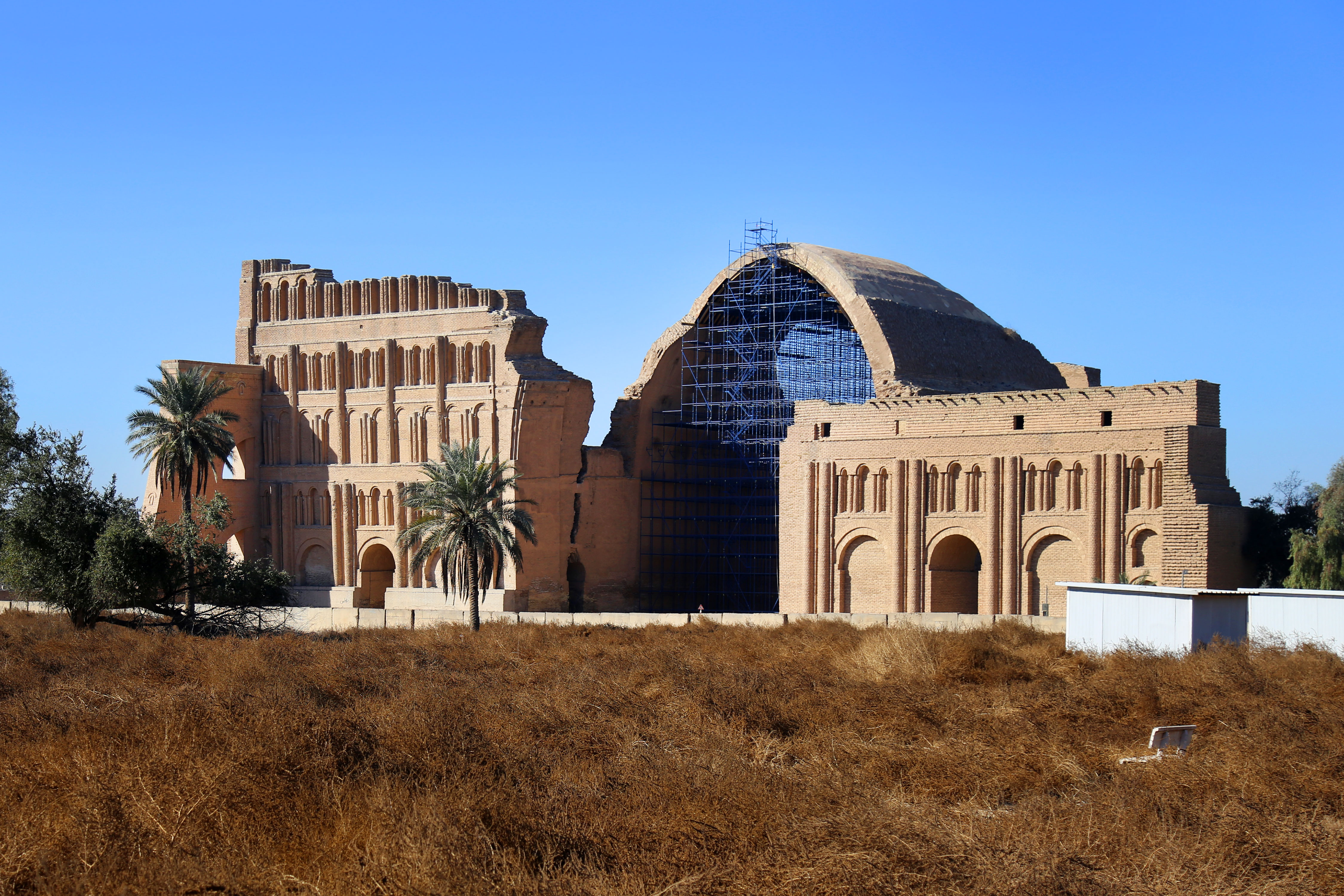
- Tāq Kasrā in 2022

- Location in Ctesiphon, modern Iraq
- Interactive map of Taq Kasra
- 33°5′37″N 44°34′51″E
- Location: Asbanbar quarter of Ctesiphon, Al-Mada'in, modern Iraq

History
- Built: ca. 3rd–6th century AD

Site notes
- Height: 37 m (121 ft)
- Architectural style: Sasanian architecture

Tāq Kasrā (Arabic: طاق كسرى, romanized: ṭāq kisrā), also transcribed as Taq-i Kisra or Taq-e Kesra (Persian: طاق کسری, romanized: tâğe kasrâ) or Ayvān-e Kesrā (Persian: ایوان خسرو, romanized: Eivâne Xosrow, lit. 'Iwan of Khosrow') are the remains of a Sasanian-era Persian monument, dated to c. the 3rd to 6th centuries, which is sometimes called the Arch of Ctesiphon. It is located near the modern town of Salman Pak, Iraq. It was the facade of the main palace in Ctesiphon, and is the only visible remaining structure of the ancient capital city. The archway is considered a landmark in the history of architecture, and is the second largest single-span vault of unreinforced brickwork in the world after the Gavmishan Bridge in Iran.

== History ==
The exact time of the structure's construction is not known with certainty. Some historians believe it was constructed under Shapur I who ruled Sasanian Persia from 242 to 272 AD while others believe that construction possibly began during the reign of Khosrow I after a campaign against the Byzantines in 540 AD. The arched iwan hall, open on the facade side, was about 37 m (121 ft) high, 26 m (85 ft) across and 50 m (160 ft) long, the largest man-made, free standing vault constructed until modern times.

The arch was part of the imperial palace complex. The throne room—presumably under or behind the arch—was more than 30 m (110 ft) high and covered an area 24 m (80 ft) wide by 48 m (160 ft) long. The top of the arch is about 1 m (3.3 ft) thick while the walls at the base are up to 7 meters thick. The catenary arch was built without centring. In order to make this possible a number of techniques were used. The bricks were laid about 18 degrees from the vertical which allowed them to be partially supported by the rear wall during construction. The quick drying cement used as mortar allowed the fresh bricks to be quickly supported by those that were previously laid.

The Taq Kasra is now all that remains above ground of a city that was, for nine centuries—from the 2nd century BC to the 7th century AD—the main capital of the successor dynasties of the Persian Empire: the Parthians and Sasanians. The structure left today was the main portico of the audience hall of the Sasanians, who maintained the same site chosen by the Parthians and for the same reason, namely proximity to the Roman Empire, whose expansionist aims could be better contained at the point of contact.

The structure was captured by the Arabs during the conquest of Ctesiphon in 637 (part of the Muslim conquest of Persia). They then used it as a mosque for a while until the area was gradually abandoned. In the early 10th century, the Abbasid caliph al-Muktafi dug up the ruins of the palace to reuse its bricks in the construction of the Taj Palace in Baghdad.

The Arabic poet Al-Buhturi wrote a famous poem about the ruins in the 9th century. (Note: Sperl, Stefan (2006). Crossing enemy boundaries: Al-Buhturī's ode on the ruins of Ctesiphon re-read in the light of Virgil and Wilfred Owen. Bulletin of the School of Oriental and African Studies. 69. 365-379. 10.1017/S0041977X06000164. Quotation: "[...] the by now abandoned ruins of its capital, Ctesiphon. The contemplation of the majestic remains of its royal palace—the great central arch of which stands to this day—inspired him to compose a masterpiece which is ranked among the finest specimens of classical Arabic literature and has been subject to much critical attention, especially in recent times.")

The monument is also the subject of a poem by the Persian poet Khaqani, who visited the ruins in the 12th century.

=== Modern era ===
In 1851, French artist Eugène Flandin visited and studied the structure with Pascal Coste who remarked "the Romans had nothing similar or of the type."

In 1888, a serious flood demolished the greater part of the edifice.

In 1940, the British writer Roald Dahl, then undergoing pilot training at RAF Habbaniya near Baghdad took an award-winning photograph using a Zeiss camera of the Arch of Ctesiphon in Iraq which was subsequently auctioned by the Dahl family to raise funds for the Roald Dahl Museum and Story Centre. The photo made £6,000. In his autobiography Boy he writes:

You may not believe it, but when I was eighteen I used to win prizes and medals from the Royal Photographic Society in London, and from other places like the Photographic Society of Holland. I even got a lovely big bronze medal from the Egyptian Photographic Society in Cairo, and I still have the photograph that won it. It is a picture of one of the so-called Seven Wonders of the World, the Arch of Ctesiphon in Iraq. This is the largest unsupported arch on earth and I took the photograph while I was training out there for the RAF in 1940. I was flying over the desert solo in an old Hawker Hart biplane and I had my camera round my neck. When I spotted the huge arch standing alone in a sea of sand, I dropped one wing and hung in my straps and let go of the stick while I took aim and clicked the shutter. It came out fine.

The monument was in the process of being rebuilt by Saddam Hussein's government in the course of the 1980s, when the fallen northern wing was partially rebuilt. All works, however, stopped after the 1991 Persian Gulf War. From 2004 to 2008 the Iraqi government cooperated with the University of Chicago's Diyala Project to restore the site at a cost of $100,000. The Ministry of Culture also invited a Czech company, Avers, to restore the site. This restoration was completed in 2017.

On 7 March 2019, a partial collapse further damaged the Taq Kasra, just two years after its latest restoration was completed.

In January 2021, Iranian Minister of Cultural Heritage Ali Asghar Mounesan mentioned that a credit of about $600,000 would be required for the restoration of Taq Kasra.

== Documentary film ==
In 2017, Pejman Akbarzadeh, based in the Netherlands, made the first full-length documentary film about Taq Kasra: Taq Kasra: Wonder of Architecture. The monument had been in danger of ISIS attacks in 2015–2016; Akbarzadeh feared that it might be destroyed soon, and therefore felt urgency to film his documentary. The film explores the history and architecture of Taq Kasra with many scholars and archaeologists in various countries.

== Gallery ==
Taq Kasra Gallery

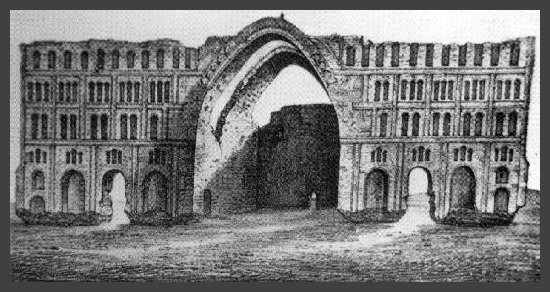
1824 drawing by Captain Hart

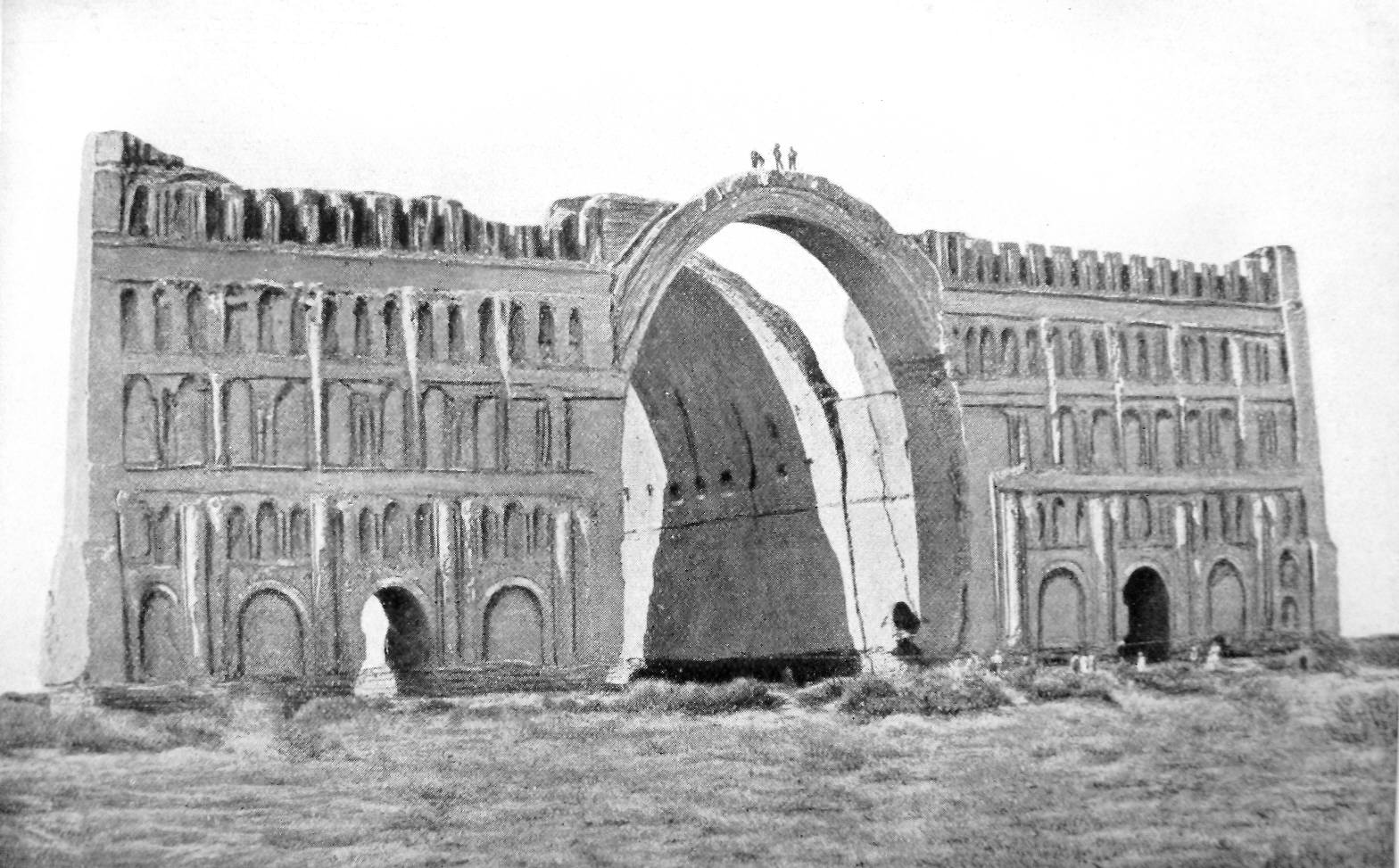
1864 drawing

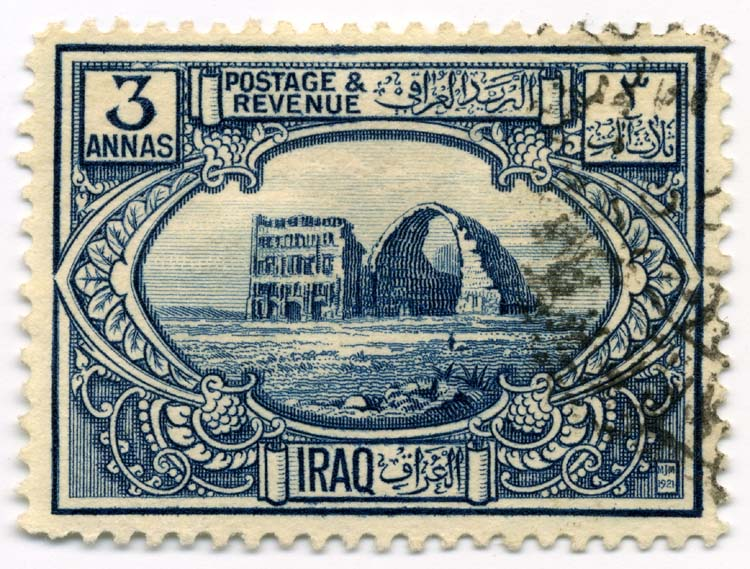
1923 Iraqi postage stamp, designed by Marjorie Maynard, featuring the arch

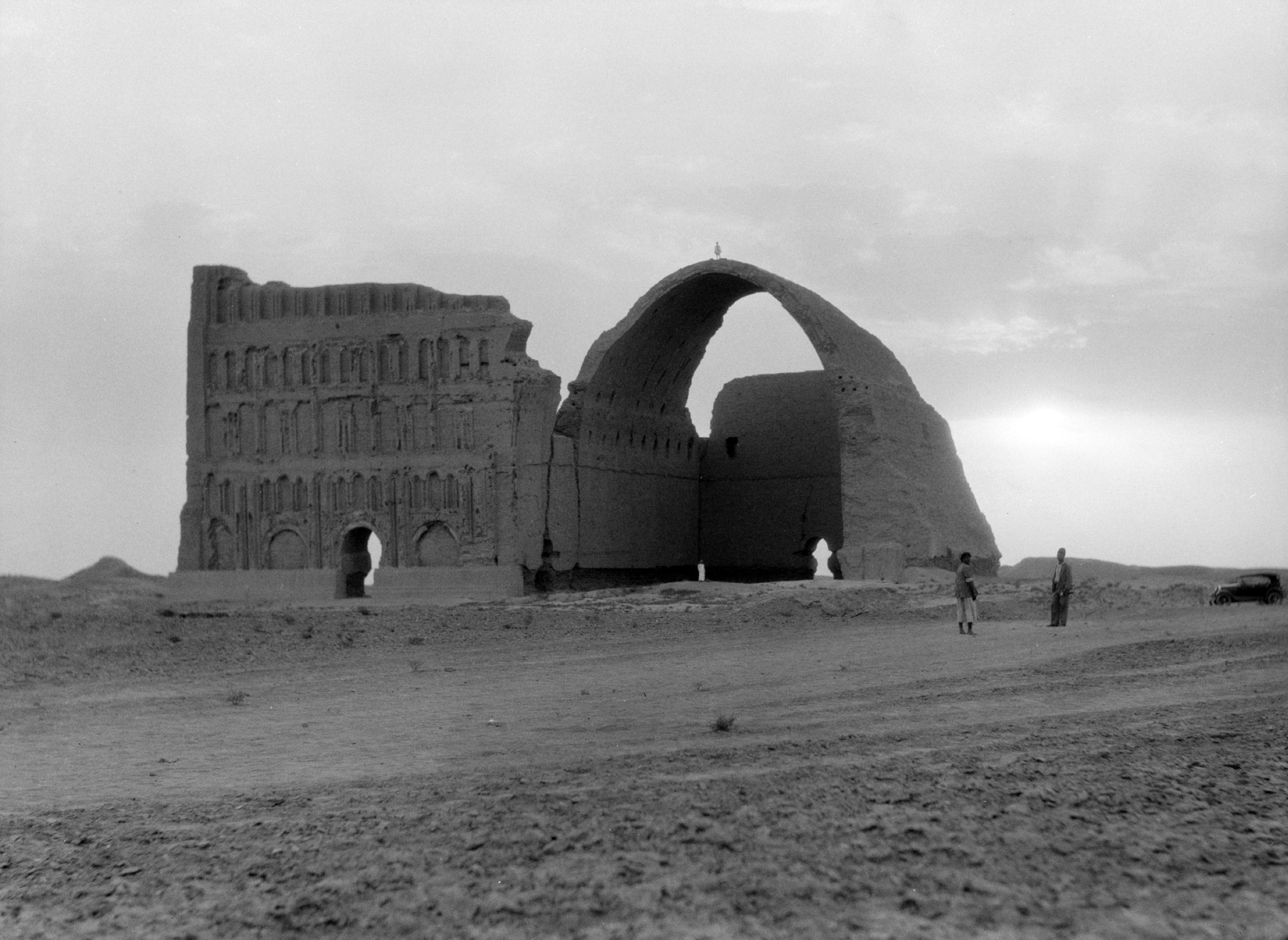
1932 photograph

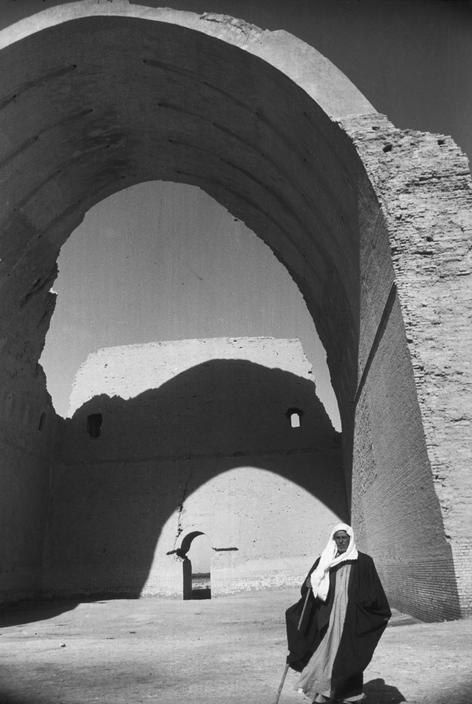
1950 photograph

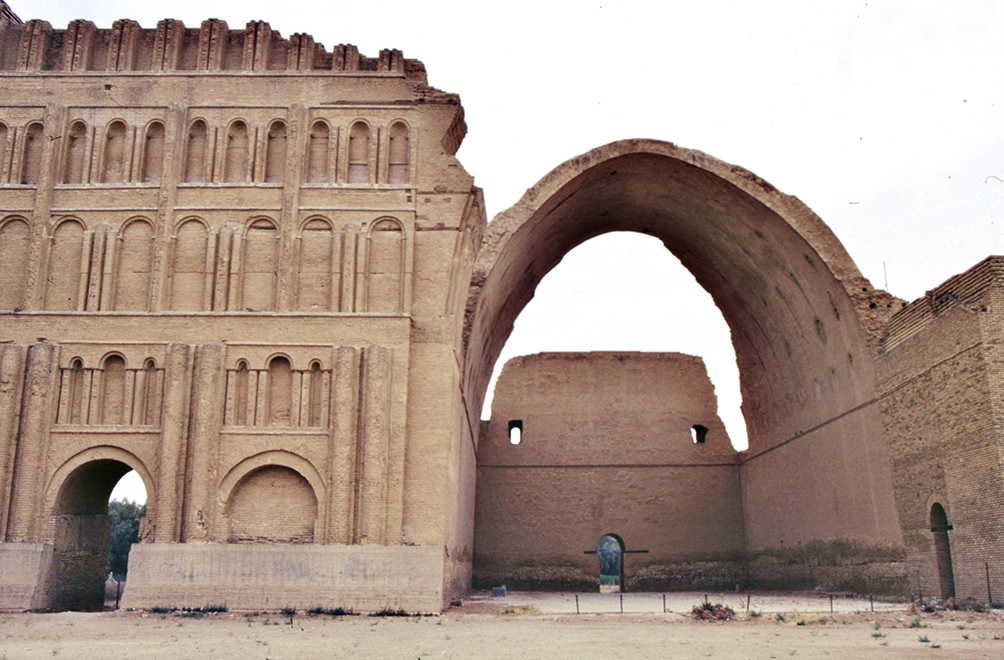
2016 photograph

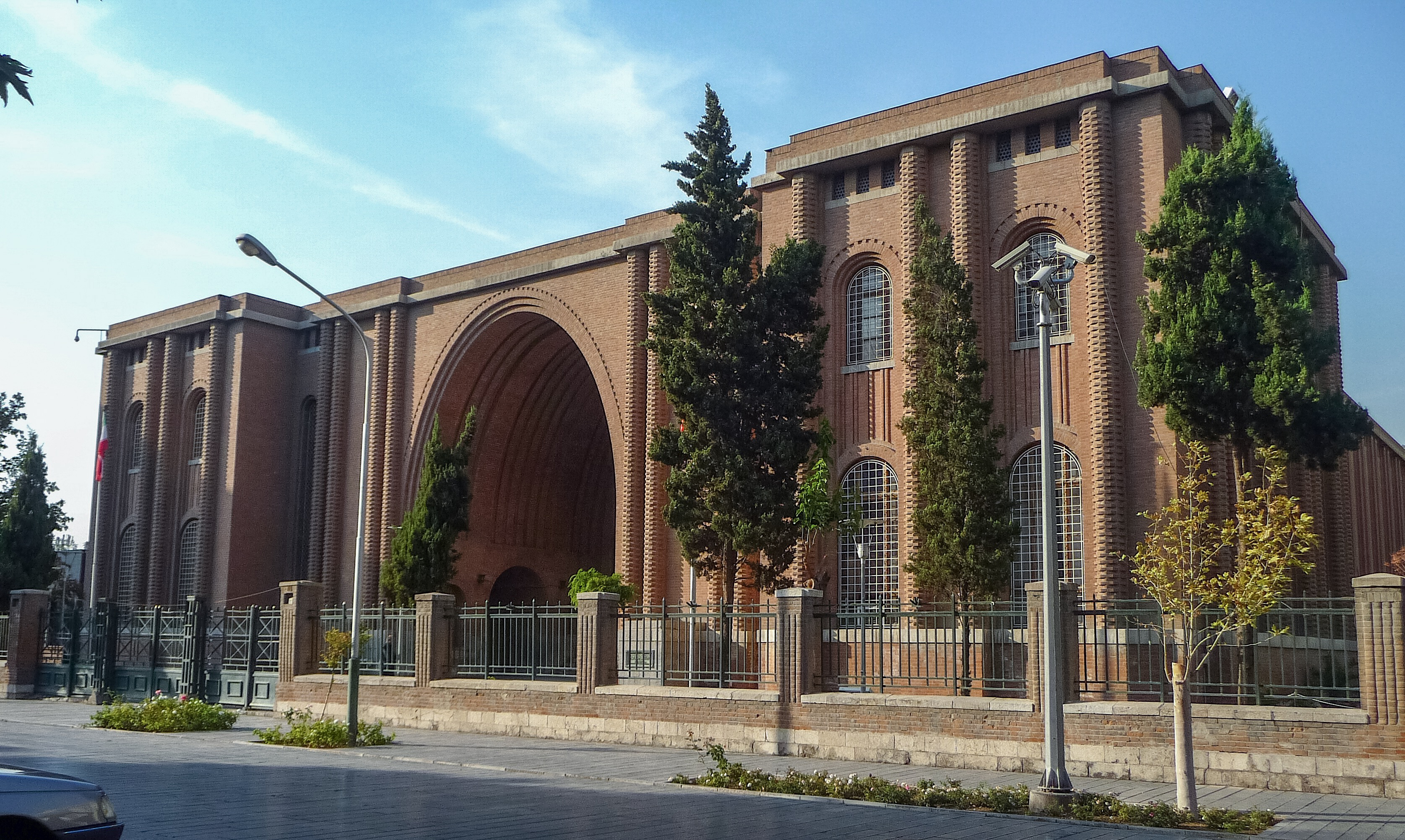
The National Museum of Iran, the architecture of which is adopted from that of Taq Kasra

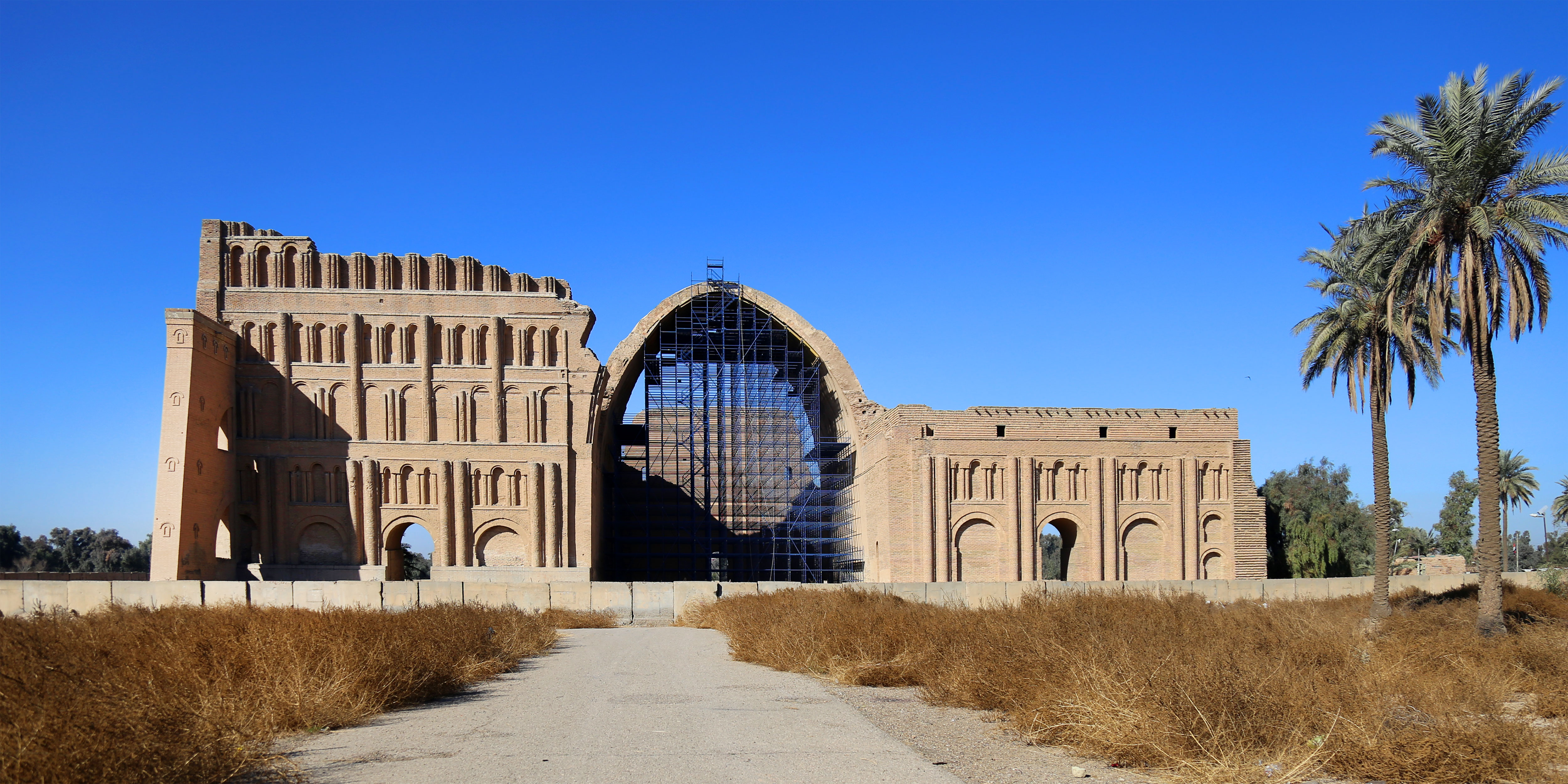
Taq Kasra, Madain, Iraq

== See also ==
- Sasanian Empire
- Sasanian architecture
- Al-Ukhaidir Fortress
- Hatra
