= Cyril Crossland =

Cyril Crossland (April 19, 1878, Sheffield, England – January 7, 1943, Hellerup, Gentofte municipality, Denmark) was an English zoologist.

He worked as an assistant to Charles Eliot. He studied several groups of marine animals, especially the Protozoa, Corals and Molluscs.

Crossland took a position at the Denmark Zoological Museum in 1938. Tim Flannery writes In his book "Europe A Natural History" " ... Prior to his (Crossland) death in 1943 he was seen riding the Copenhagen trams, roundly abusing the Nazis in a cultivated English accent. "

== Career ==
Cyril Crossland (1878-1943) was born in Sheffield, the son of landscape painter James Henry Crossland and wife Mary Ann. He studied and worked with marine flora and fauna in a variety of UK and overseas locations, summarised below:

1894-1900 Student at University of London (gained BSc. in 1900).

1897-1900 Student at Cambridge University (gained Master's degree in 1902).

1900-Mar 1902 Assistant to Sir Charles Eliot (British Consul-General at Zanzibar, Commissioner for East African Protectorate, and specialist in nudibranchs, collecting and studying marine fauna in Zanzibar.

1902-1904 Assistant to Professor William Carmichael McIntosh at St Andrews University.

July-September 1904 Collecting in the Cape Verde Islands, assisted by a grant from the Carnegie Institution.

Oct 1904-May 1905 Selected by Professor W A Herdman to investigate fauna and flora of the Sudan Coast of the Red Sea.

1905-1922 Director of the Sudan Pearl Fishery.

January 6, 1906, Windermere, Westmorland, England: 1st marriage, to Cathrine Mary Dobson (b. 1875).

1923 Scientific research in England.

1924-1926 Joined the St George expedition to the South Pacific in 1924, visiting the Panama region, Galapagos and Marquesas, before leaving the expedition at Tahiti, where he continued to study marine ecology and corals.

1927 Scientific research in England.

June 11, 1927, England: 2nd marriage, to Danish national Hildur Thal-Jantzen (b. 1894, Svindinge, Denmark- d. 1977, Copenhagen, Denmark).

1928 Returned to Tahiti, to study coral reefs.

1930-38 Established and directed a marine biological station at Ghardaqa on the Red Sea Coast, at the request of the Egyptian Government. During this time, he also participated in an oceanographical expedition to the North West Indian Ocean, in the Egyptian Steamer 'Mabahiss'.

1938-1943 Moved to Denmark with Hildur and their son Ingolf Crossland (1929-2020, born in Paea, Tahiti), continuing scientific work at the University of Copenhagen's Zoological Museum until his death.

Crossland discovered over one hundred new species; two genera and around twenty-five species are named after him. Including small notes, he published about fifty titles, thirty of which are purely scientific in nature.

Crossland's interest in protozoa, begun during his years as assistant to McIntosh, continued throughout his career. He published seven papers on protozoa, all concerning species from the Red Sea, East Africa, Zanzibar the Maldives and the Cape Verde Islands. However, Crossland is best known for his influential work on corals and coral reefs, including his important paper 'On Forskals's Collection of Corals in the Zoological Museum of Copenhagen', and his ecological studies of Zanzibar, Tahiti and the Red Sea. Few scientific papers result from his stay on the Sudan Coast; his large manuscript on the biology and cultivation of the pearl oyster never found publication.

The World Register of Marine Species lists 67 marine species named by Crossland, many of which have become synonyms. Sixty marine species were named after him with the epithet "crosslandi".

== Publications ==
- Crossland, C., 1903. On the marine fauna of Zanzibar and British East Africa, from collections made by Cyril Crossland in the years 1901 and 1902. - Polychaeta. Part II. Proceedings of the Zoological Society of London, 2: 129-144, plates XIV-XV.
- Crossland, C., 1903. On the marine fauna of Zanzibar and British East Africa, from collections made by Cyril Crossland in the years 1901 and 1902. Polychaeta, Part I. Proceedings of the Zoological Society of London, 1(1): 169-176, plates XVI-XVII.
- Crossland, C., 1904. The Marine Fauna of Zanzibar and British East Africa, from collections made by Cyril Crossland in the Years 1901 and 1902. The Polychaeta, Part III. With which is incorporated the account made in the Maldive Archipelago in the year 1899. * Proceedings of the Zoological Society of London 1(18): 287-330.
- Crossland, C., 1904. The Polychaeta of the Maldive Archipelago from the collections made by J. Stanley Gardiner in 1899. Proceedings of the Zoological Society of London, 1(18): 270-286.
- Crossland, C., 1905. The ecology and deposits of the Cape Verde marine fauna. Proceedings of the Zoological Society of London 1905: 170-186.
- Crossland, C., 1908. Reform of zoological nomenclature. Nature 79: 190.
- Crossland, C., 1913. Desert and water gardens of the Red Sea. Cambridge, Univ. Press. Gutenberg
- Crossland, C., 1924. Polychaeta of tropical East Africa, the Red Sea, and Cape Verde Islands collected by Cyril Crossland, and of the Maldive Archipelago collected by Professor Stanley Gardiner, M.A., F.R.S. The Lumbriconereidae and Staurocephalidae. Proceedings of the Zoological Society of London 94(1): 1-106.
- Crossland, C., 1927. The expedition to the South Pacific of the S.Y. "St. George". Marine ecology and coral formations in the Panama region, the Galápagos and Marquesas Islands, and the Atoll of Napuka. Trans. R. Soc. Edinb. 55
- Crossland, C., 1928. Coral reefs of Tahiti, Moorea, and Rarotonga. J. Linn. Soc. Lond. 36 : 577-620.
- Crossland, C., 1929. Amphibious Centipedes. Nature 124: 794
- Crossland, C., 1929. Notes on the ecology of the reef-builders of Tahiti. Proc. Zool. Soc. Lond., 1928 3: 717-735.
- Crossland, C., 1931. The reduced building-power and other variation in the astrean corals of Tahiti, with a note on Herpetolitha limax and Fungia spp Proc. Zool. Soc. Lond., 1931 1: 351-392.
- Crossland, C., 1933. Distribution of the polychaete worm, Syllis ramosa McIntosh. Nature 31: 4.
- Crossland, C., 1939. The coral reefs at Ghardaqa, Red Sea. Proc. Zool. Soc. Lond., (A)1938 : 513-523.
- Crossland, C., 1941. On Forskål's collection of corals in the Zoological Museum of Copenhagen. Spolia zool. Mus. hauniensis (= Skr. Univ. Zool. Mus. København) 1 : 1-63.
- Crossland, C., 1948. Reef corals of the South Africa coast. Ann. Natal Mus. 11 2: 169-205.
- Crossland C., 1952. Madreporaria, Hydrocorallinae, Heliopora and Tubipora. Scientific Report Great Barrier Reef Expedition 1928-29 VI(3): 85-257.
