= Cynthia Longfield =

Irish explorer and entomologist (1896–1991)

- Born: 16 August 1896; Belgravia, London, England
- Died: 27 June 1991 (aged 94); Cloyne, Ireland
- Known for: dragonfly expert

Cynthia Evelyn Longfield (16 August 1896 – 27 June 1991) was an Anglo-Irish entomologist and explorer and the first woman member of the Entomological Society. She was an expert on the dragonfly and was nicknamed "Madame Dragonfly". She travelled extensively and published The Dragonflies of the British Isles in 1937. She worked as a research associate at the Natural History Museum, London, and was the expert on the dragonflies there, particularly on African species.

== Early life ==
Cynthia Evelyn Longfield was born on 16 August 1896, on Pont Street, Belgravia, London. She was the youngest daughter of Alice Elizabeth (née Mason) and Montifort Longfield, of Castle Mary, Cloyne, County Cork. She had two sisters. Her mother Alice Longfield grew up near Oxford, and was the daughter of a scientist. Alice died in 1945. The family home at Castle Mary was burned down in 1920 by rebels, and Park House was rebuilt on the grounds.

== Career ==
Longfield joined the Army Service Corps during the First World War, later moving to an aircraft factory on Fullham Road. She visited South America between December 1921 and March 1922. She travelled to the Andes and Lake Titicaca. In 1923 she travelled to Egypt, where she caught a scorpion at the tomb of Ramases IX.

In the same year Longfield answered an advertisement to join Evelyn Cheesman of London Zoo on a research trip to the Pacific, specifically the Galapagos Islands. They sailed aboard the St George, which left Dartmouth on 9 April 1924. She collected coleoptera (beetles) and lepidoptera (moths and butterflies) as an assistant to an entomologist, Cyril Collenette. The pair used machetes to hack through the undergrowth of the Amazon jungle to collect specimens for the Natural History Museum in London.

She joined the Entomological Society of London in 1925, and later the same year joined the Royal Geographical Society. She was the first woman member of the Entomological Society. In 1926 she joined the London Natural History Society. She was elected president of the society for 1932 and 1933.

Longfield was a voluntary cataloguer at the Natural History Museum and was put in charge of work on dragonflies. She joined a six-month expedition to Matto Grosso, Brazil in 1927, and returned with samples of 38 of species of dragonfly. Three of these species were previously unidentified. The species Corphaeschna longfieldae is named in her honour. By 1937, Longfield had become an international authority on the subject of dragonflies and published a book entitled The Dragonflies of the British Isles. The book quickly sold out, and earned her the name "Madame Dragonfly".

On 28 March 1938 she joined the Auxiliary Fire Service, and during the Second World War ensured that a turntable ladder was used in response to the bombing of the biology department of the Natural History Museum in April 1941. Cyril Collenette stated that her actions in relation to this likely saved the Museum from destruction. She was appointed an honorary associate of the Natural History Museum in 1948.

In 1979 she donated dragonfly and damselfly specimens to the Royal Irish Academy, as well as her written records and more than 500 natural history books. In 1983 she was elected the first Honorary Member of the British Dragonfly Society.

== Later life and death ==
Before her retirement from the Natural History Museum, Longfield purchased an apartment in Kensington, London, where she resided until her eventual retirement at age 60. In 1957, she returned to Castle Mary, the family estate, in Cloyne, County Cork where she lived until her death. She died aged 96 on 27 June 1991 and was buried in St. Coleman's Church of Ireland Cathedral, close to her home in Cloyne.

== Legacy and commemoration ==
The Longfield Roberts Collection, a photograph album belonging to Longfield and taken and developed during the St George Expedition to the South Sea Islands in 1924 to 1925, is held by the Royal Irish Academy. The c.800 photographs mainly depict the people and life on the ship and the flora and fauna of the Pacific Islands.

An exhibition entitled The Longfield exhibition was opened in the Royal Irish Academy on Dawson Street in 2006.

Longfield's life and career was celebrated by an event held on the centenary of the St George expedition.

== Works ==
- 1914. Royal Army Service Corps, driver (1914–1916)
- 1916. Aeroplane factory worker (1916–1918)
- 1924. St. George Expedition, Assistant Entomologist (unpaid)(1924–1925)
- 1936. Studies on African Odonata, with synonymy, and descriptions of new species and subspecies. Trans. R. ent. Soc. London 85(20): 467–498.
- (1936) Contribution à l'étude de la faune du Mozambique. Voyage de M.P. Lesne (1928–1929). 23e note – Odonata. Memórias e Estudos do Museu Zoológico da Universidade de Coimbra, 89: 1–2 . Insecta. C. Longfield.
- (1945) – The Odonata of South Angola. Arquivos do Museu Bocage, 16, Lisboa.
- (1955) – The Odonata of N. Angola. Publicações Culturais, Companhia de Diamantes de Angola (Diamang), Lisboa, 27: 11–63. Biologia. Entomologia. Angola.
- (1959) – The Odonata of N. Angola. Publicações Culturais, Companhia de Diamantes de Angola (Diamang), Lisboa, 45: 11–42. Entomologia. Angola.
- (1960) Dragonflies Corbet, P.S., Longfield, C.N. and Moore, N.W. New Naturalist No 41, Collins, London.
