= Pottery collection of the Albert Hall Museum =

Pottery collection of Albert Hall Museum

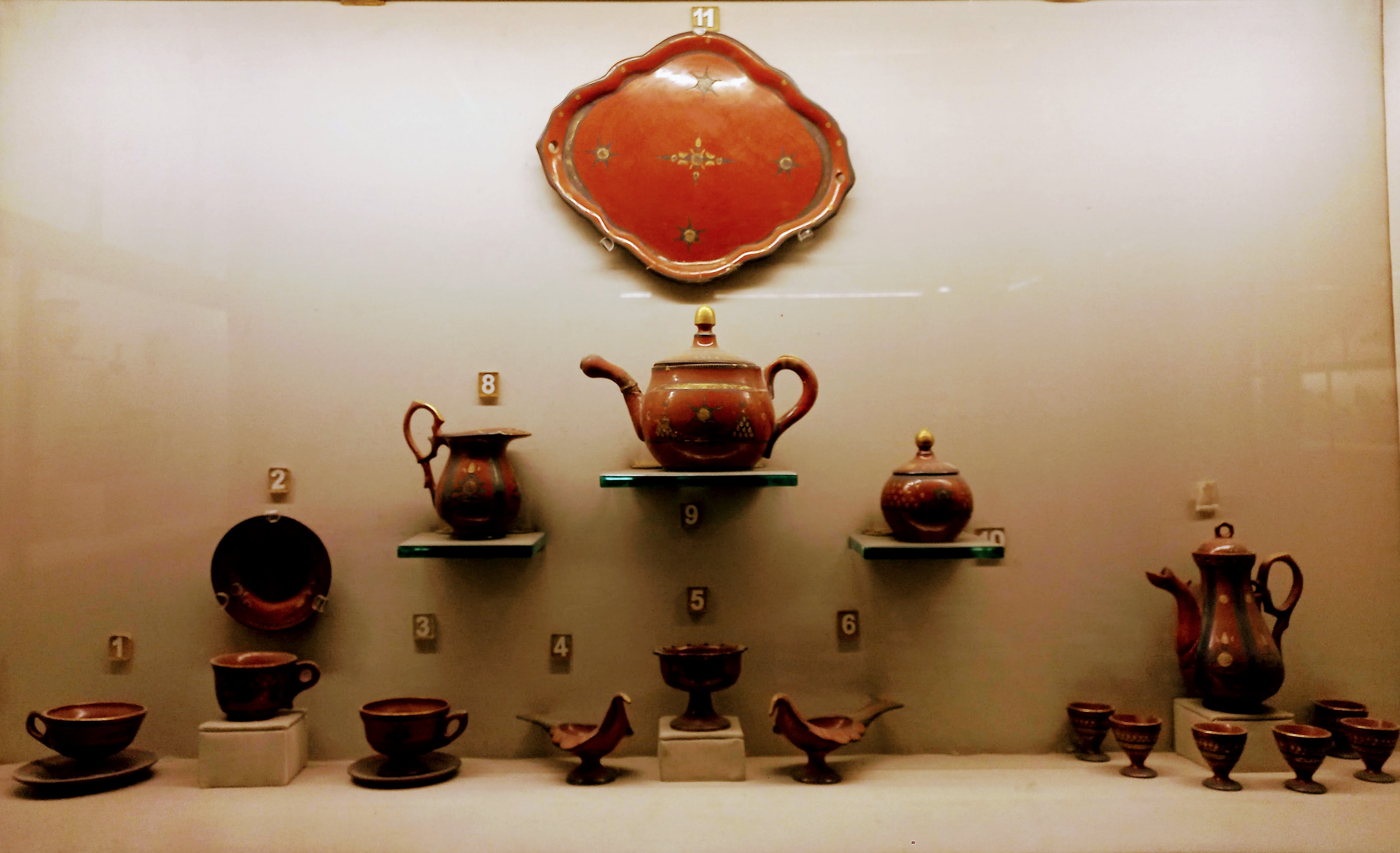
Pottery Collection, Albert Hall Museum

The pottery collection of the Albert Hall Museum in Jaipur, India, is a diverse 19th-century collection. The collection represents a wide range of crafts, techniques, and regions. The display includes unglazed vessels with ornamental decoration. The pottery techniques on display include burnished, lacquered, slip-painted, incised wares, and glazed pottery. The museum has representative pieces of Indian craftsmanship and other international pottery styles.

== History ==
The origins of the Albert Hall Museum can be traced to the Jaipur Exhibition of Industrial Crafts and Decorative Items, held in 1883. The exhibition was held under the patronage of Maharaja Sawai Madho Singh II (1880–1922). It displayed the works of craftsmen from different parts of India, but gave the artists of Rajasthan and from Jaipur School of Art were given special attention to exhibit their skills and products. It led to the establishment of a permanent museum of industrial arts in Jaipur, the Albert Hall Museum which continues to house the original exhibits from 1883. The founding collection of pottery was meticulously curated by Colonel Thomas H. Hendley, who collected good examples of pottery from throughout India as well as other countries. Wherever they could not procure the samples, they got replicas or representative pieces manufactured. The museum was formally opened in 1887 with a significant pottery collection at its inception. Mahraja Sawai Ram Singh II and his successor, Sawai Madho Singh II, were instrumental in enriching the museum by supporting the establishment of Jaipur School of Art in 1866. The training of industrial craft and experiments in pottery supported the pottery collection as conceived by Hendley.

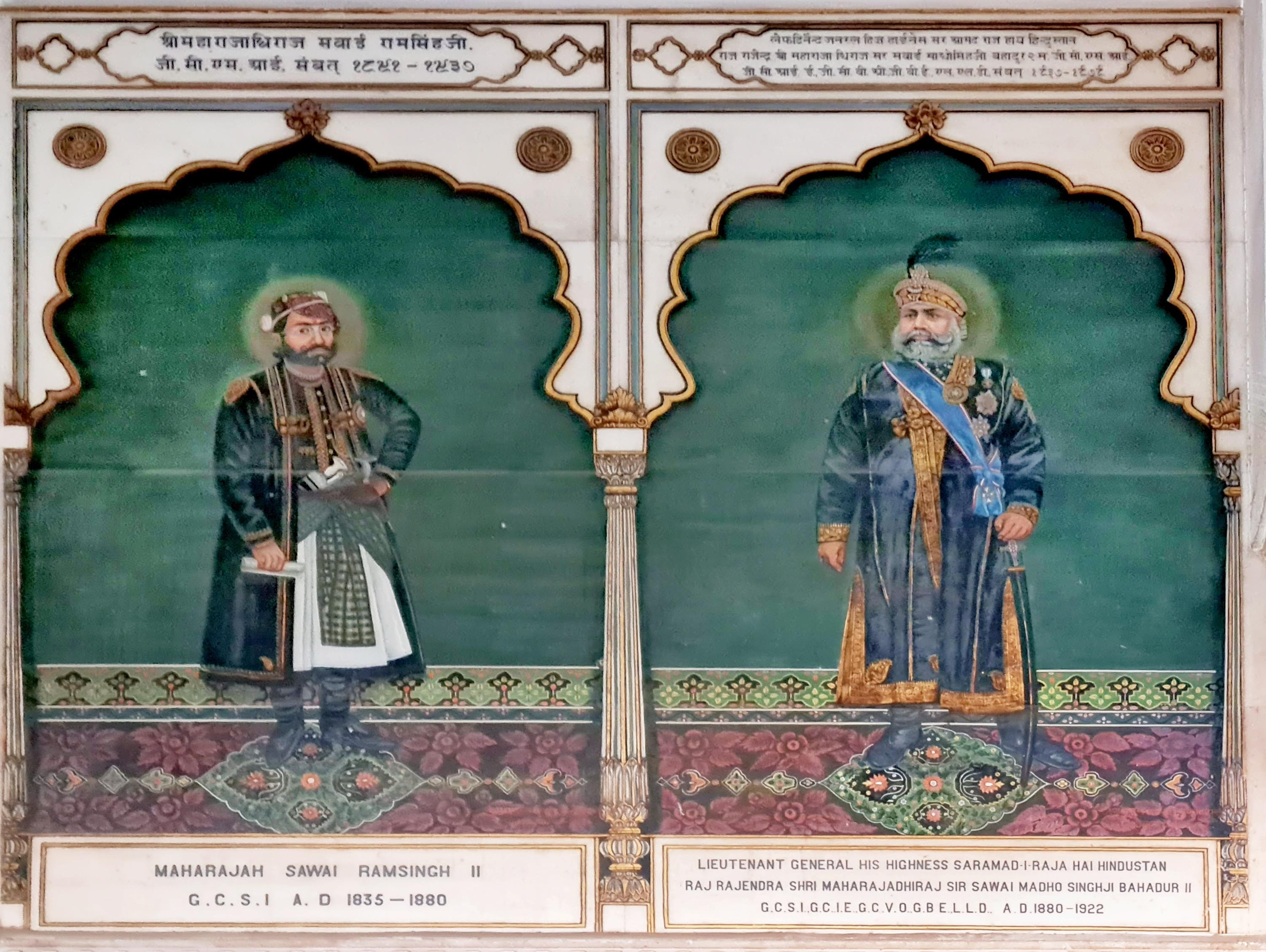
Jaipur Rulers Ramsingh II and Sawai Madho Singh, Mural, Albert Hall Museum, Jaipur.

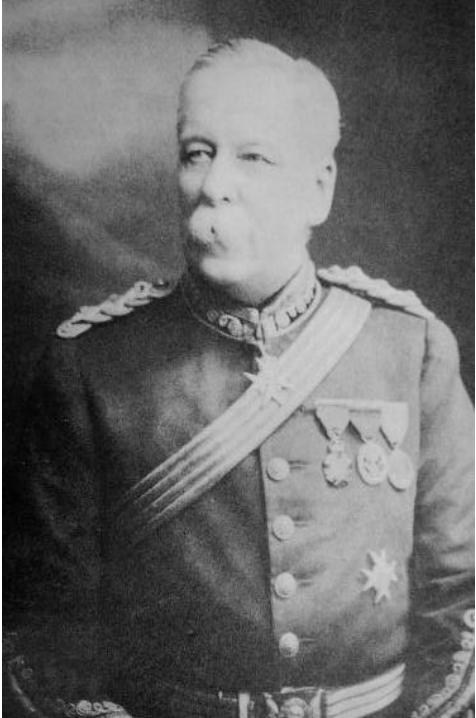
T. H. Hendley

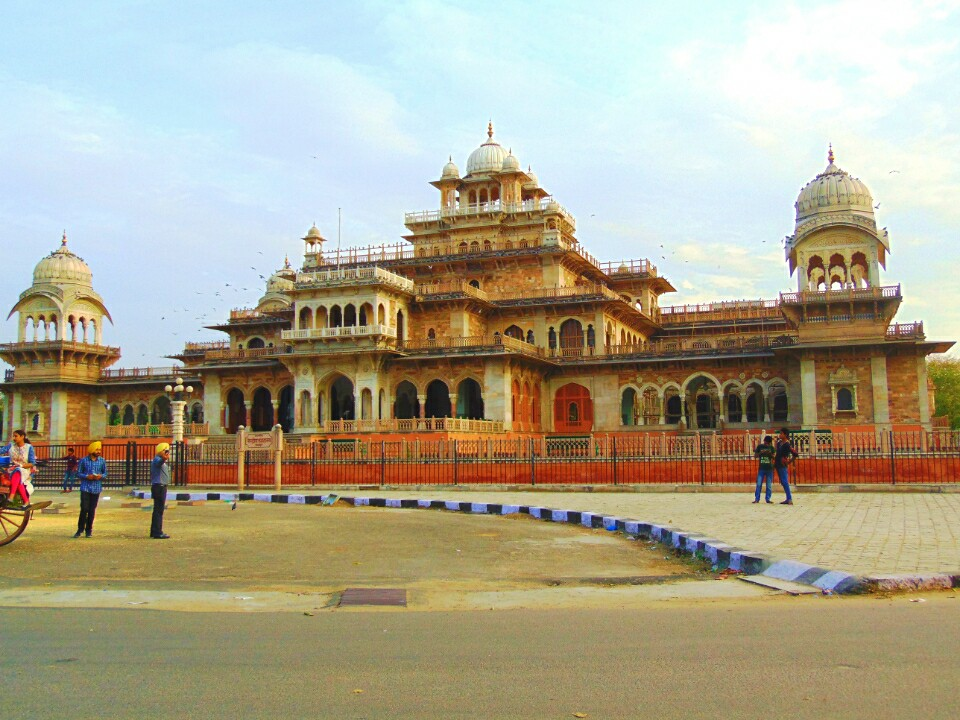
Albert Hall Museum, Jaipur

Handbook of Jeypore Museum, Hendley

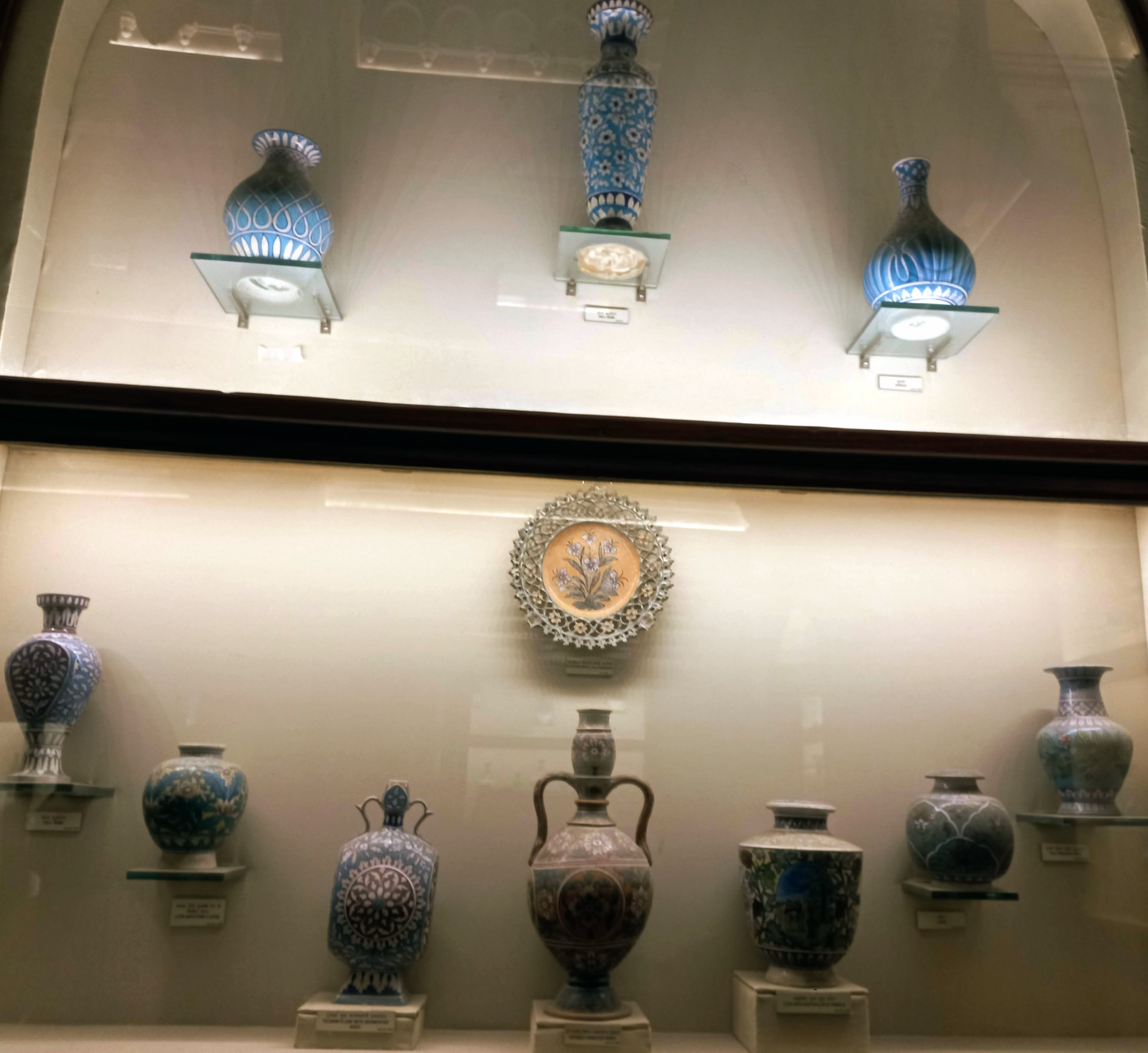
A section of the pottery collection

== Collection ==
Pottery was something used by everyone and was one of the most prolific crafts in 19th-century India. This was a time when European influence was affecting Indian pottery, which had until then evolved in accordance with locally available raw materials, regional craftsmanship, and community needs. Thus, India and its regions had traditionally harboured several styles such as kagazi or thin-walled slip pottery from Patan and Bahwalpur, Bidri art or smoked and burnished black ceramics with silver inlay from Bengal and Azamgarh, the red and white Kutch pottery are held in the museum collection. The collection represents Rajasthan as well as India to the west. Although, it was generally assumed that India was skilled in production of unglazed pottery, coloured slipware, burnished surfaces, and in previous glazed pottery had also been developed by Indian craftsmen. The glazed earthenware ranging from domestic vessels to tiles, architectural elements and decorative objects are displayed. The collection evidences that Indian craftsmanship illustrated artistic terracotta tiles from temples of Gaur, Pandua and Bengal to Islamic calligraphy and geometric patterns Multan, Peshawar, and Sindh. The collection includes works of the Madras, Bombay, and Jaipur schools. In the process of supplying samples to the museum for exhibition, they developed new techniques.

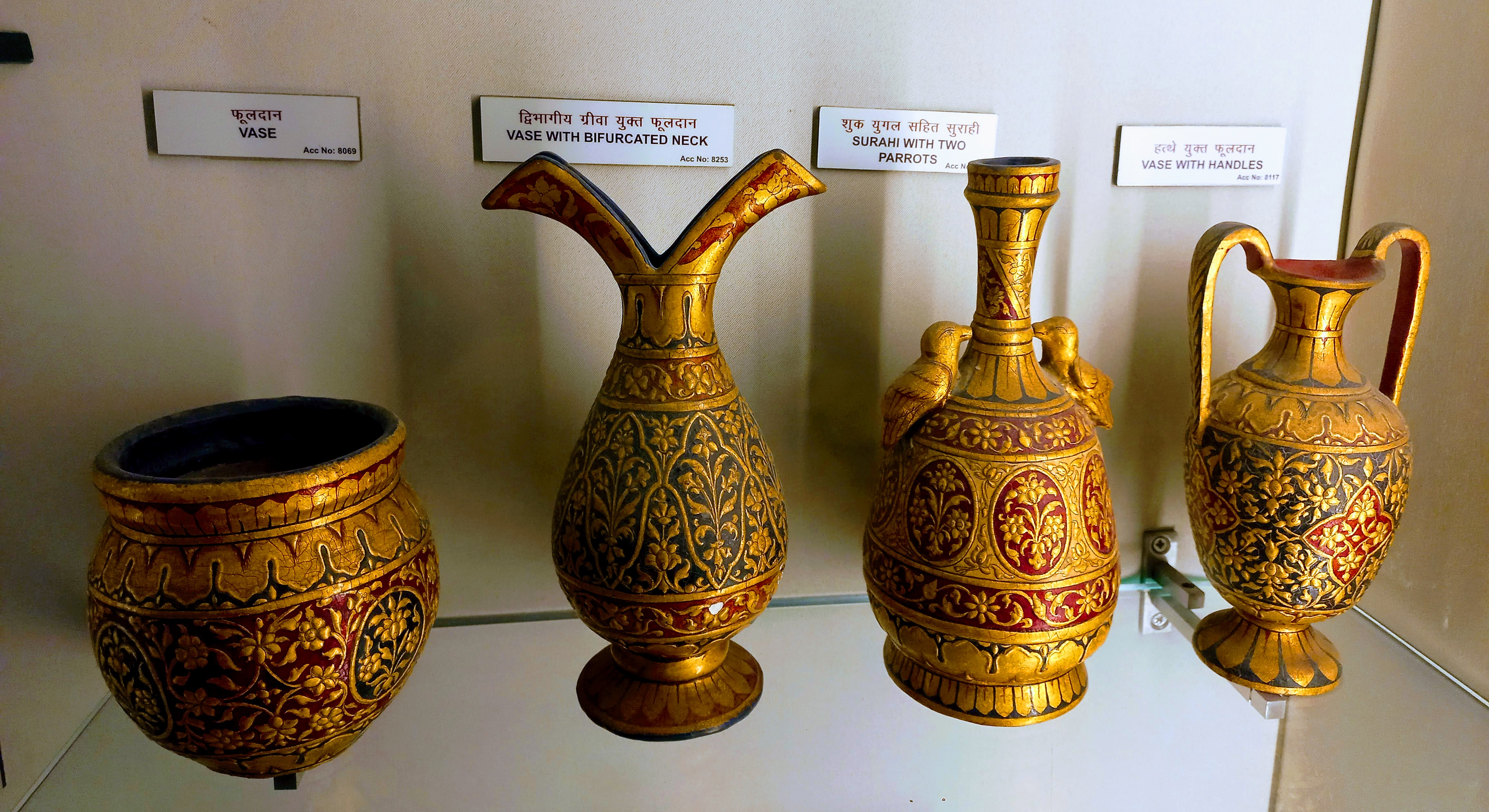
Gold Lacquer Pottery

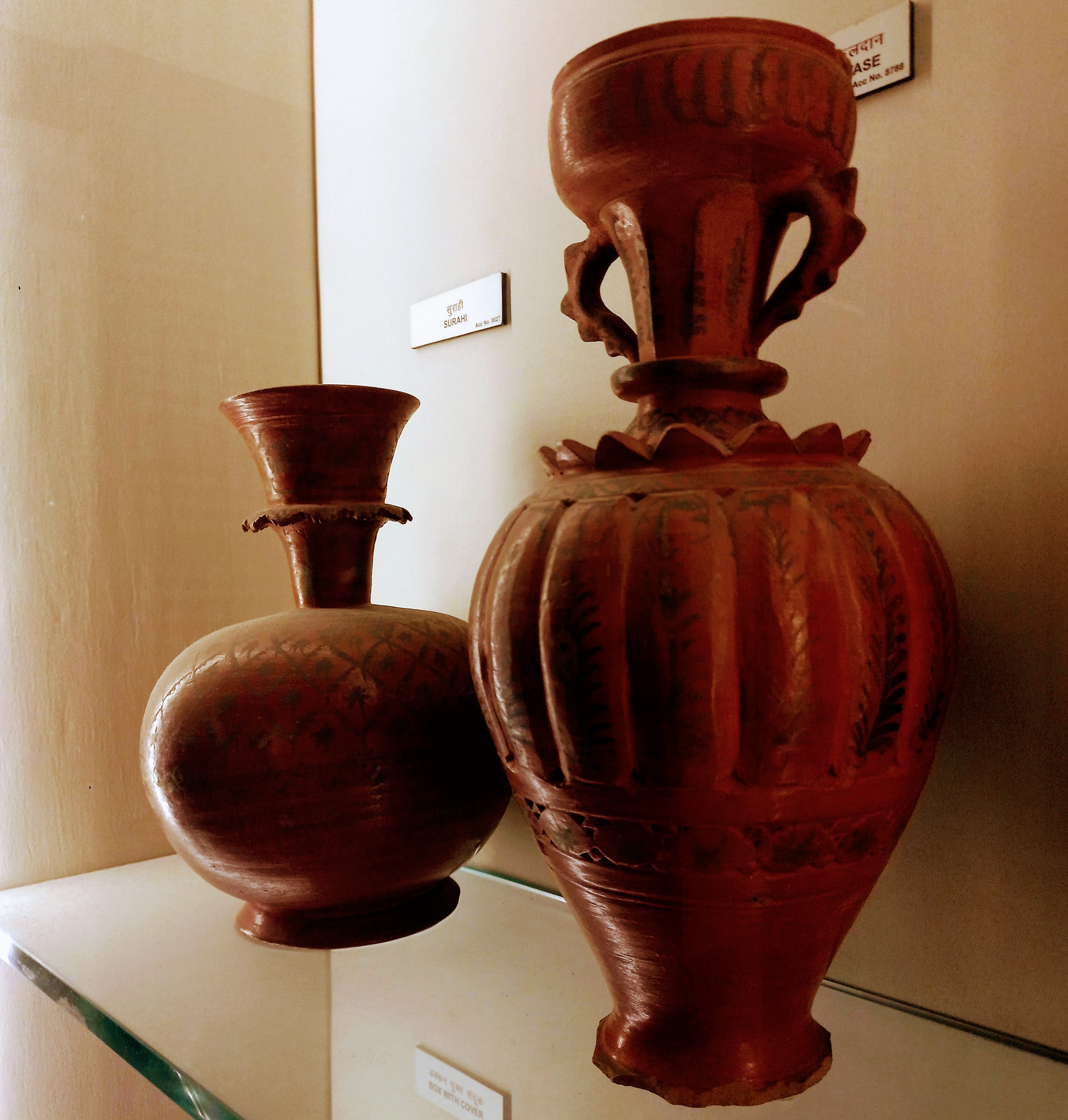
Pottery from Patan, Gujrat

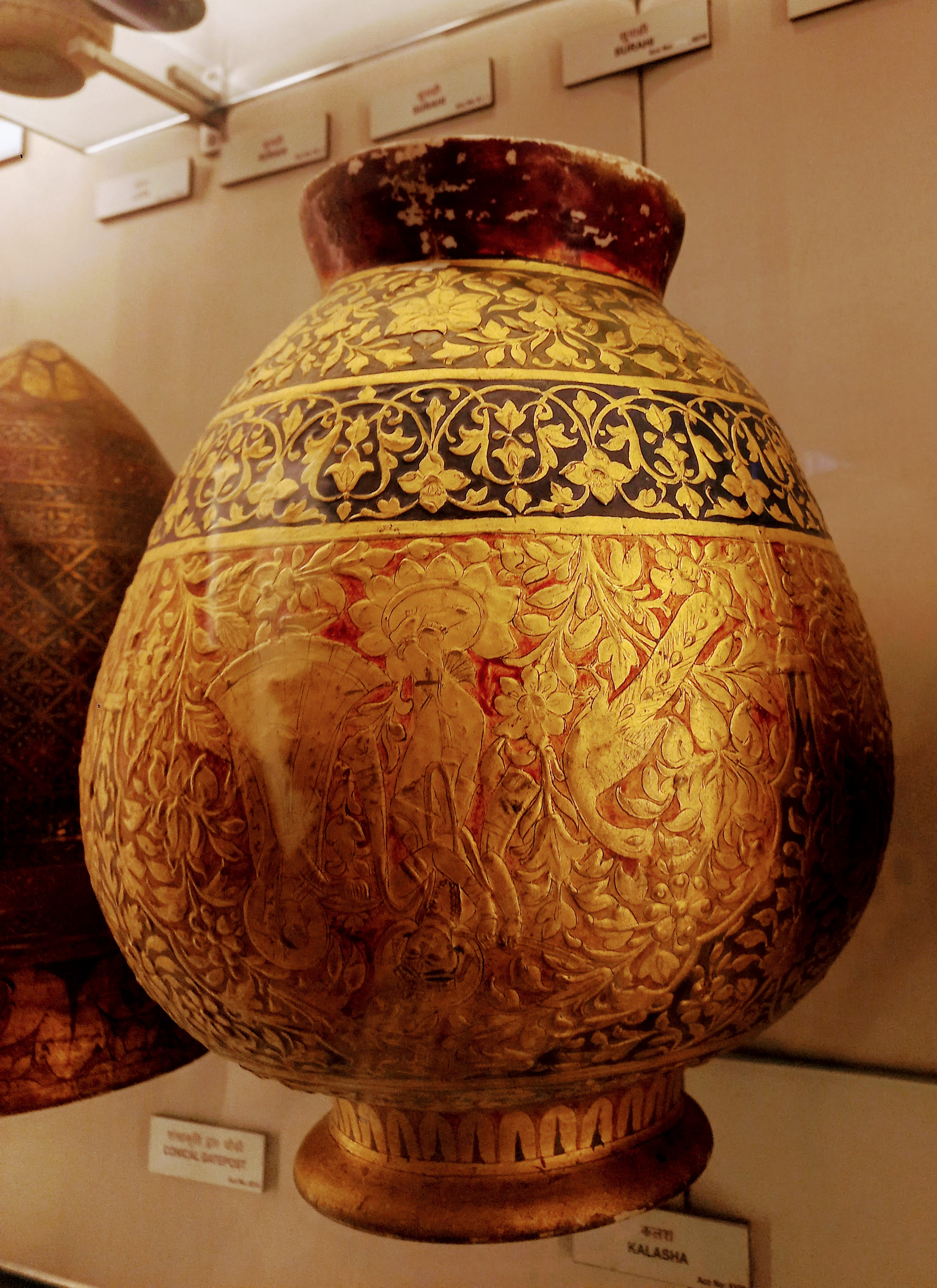
Traditional Glazed Sindh Pottery

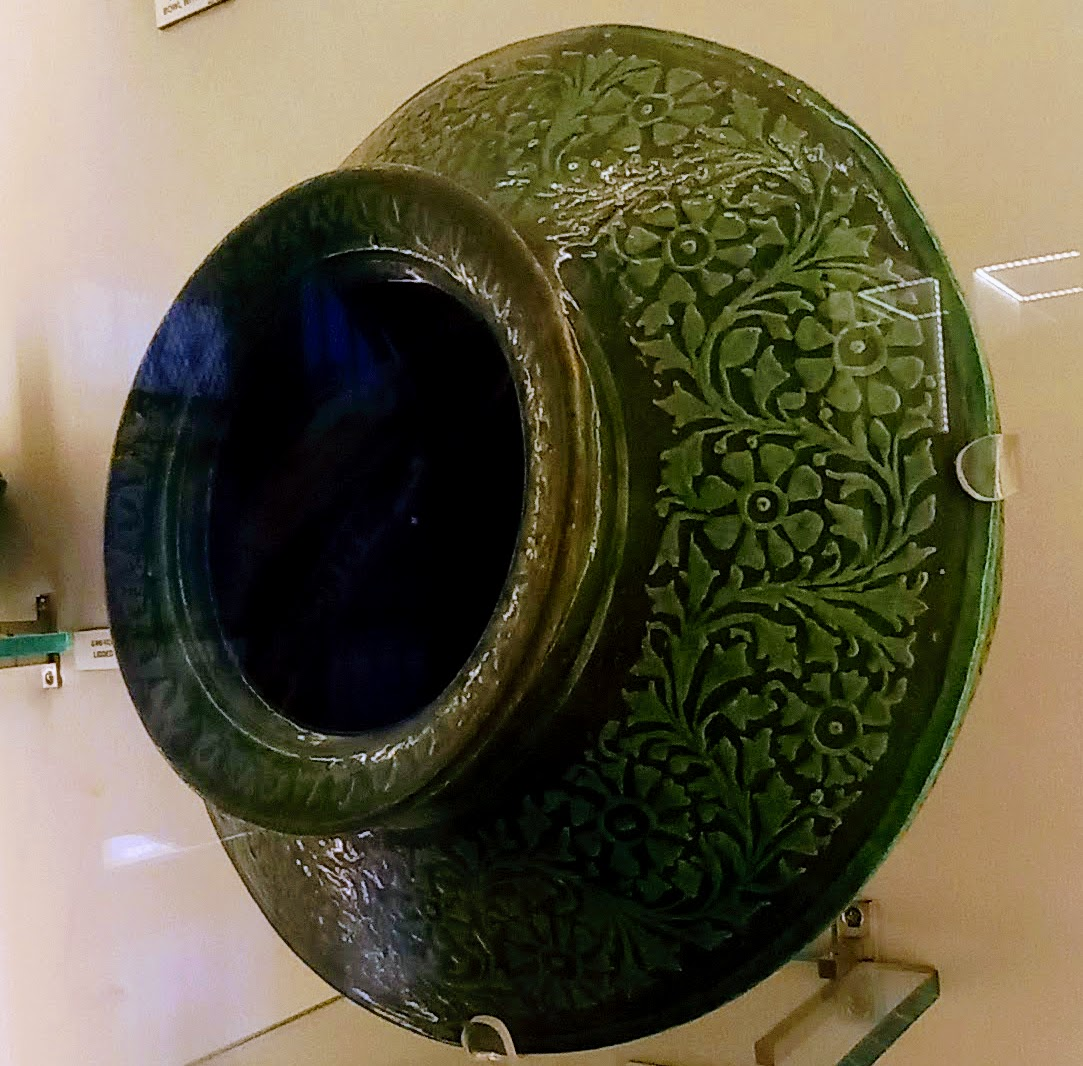
Hala Sindh Pottery

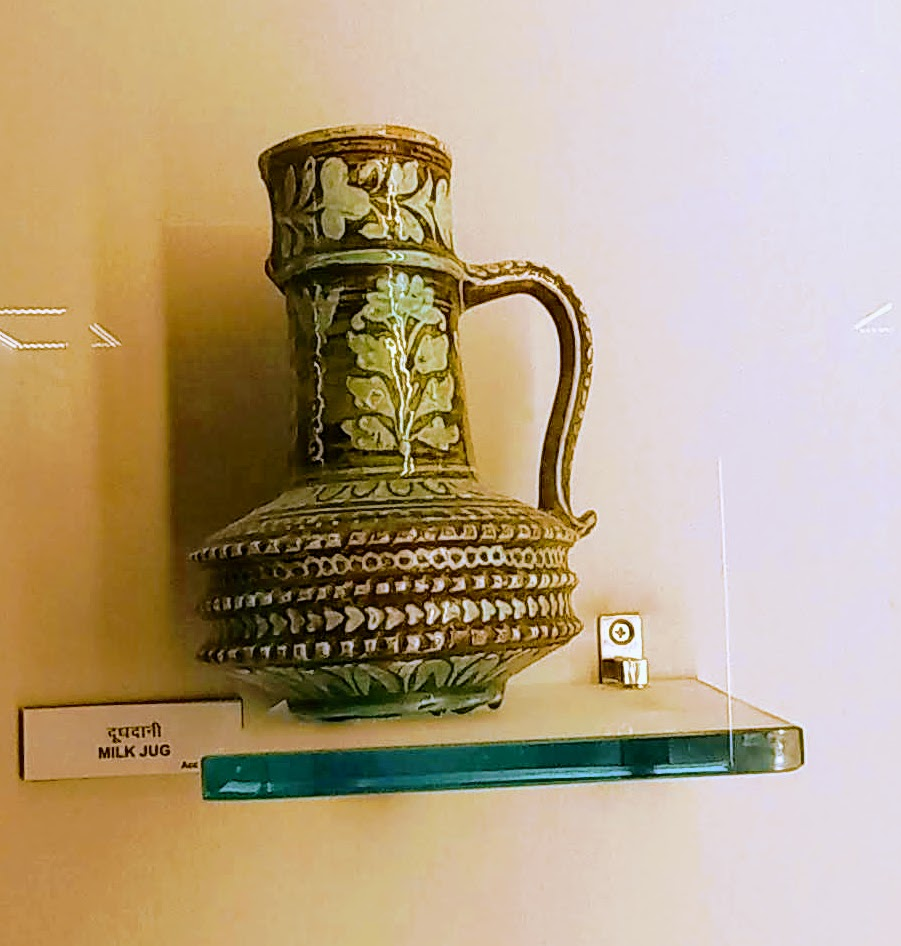
Vase, Sindh

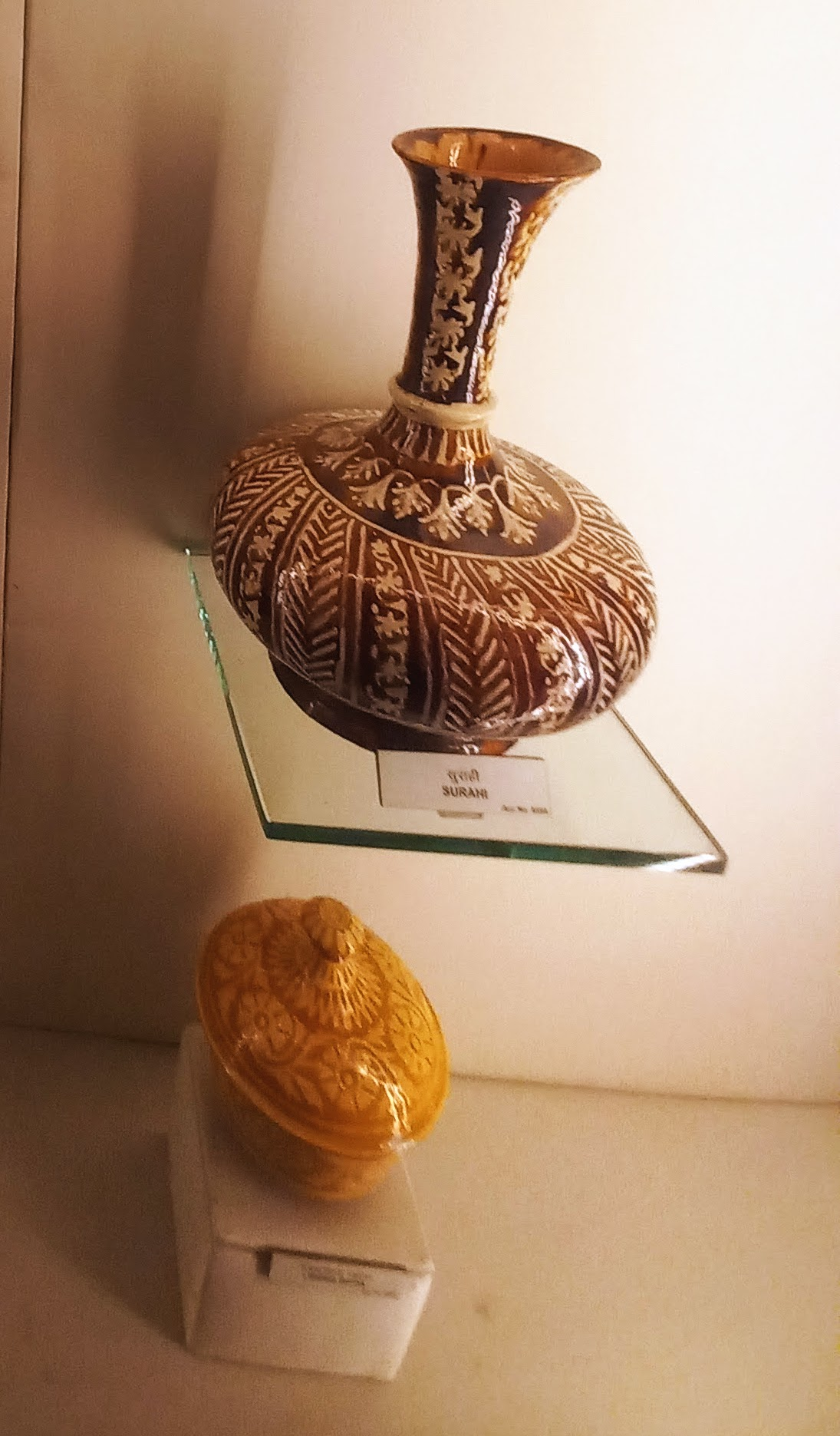
Sindh Pottery Display

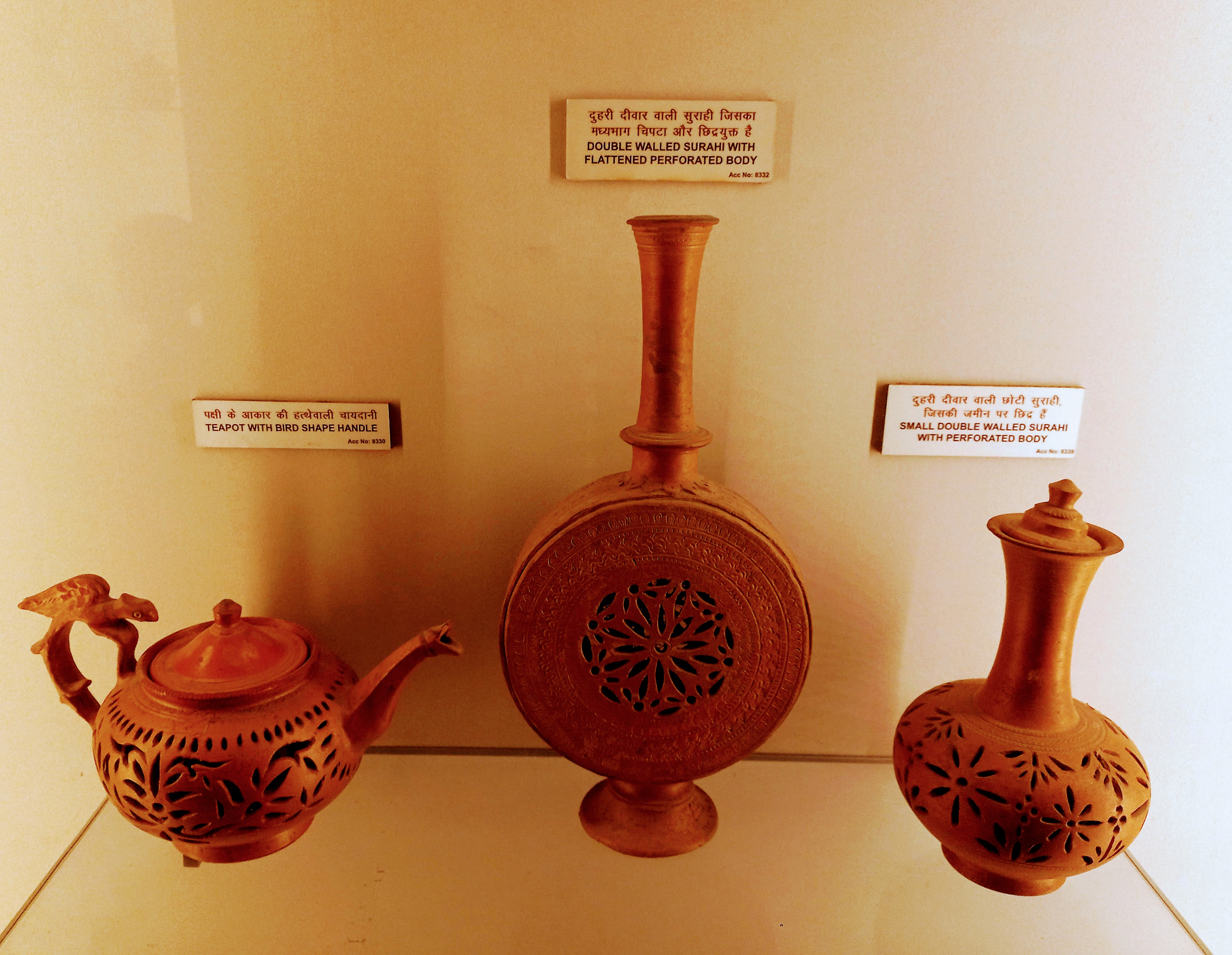
Perforated Pottery

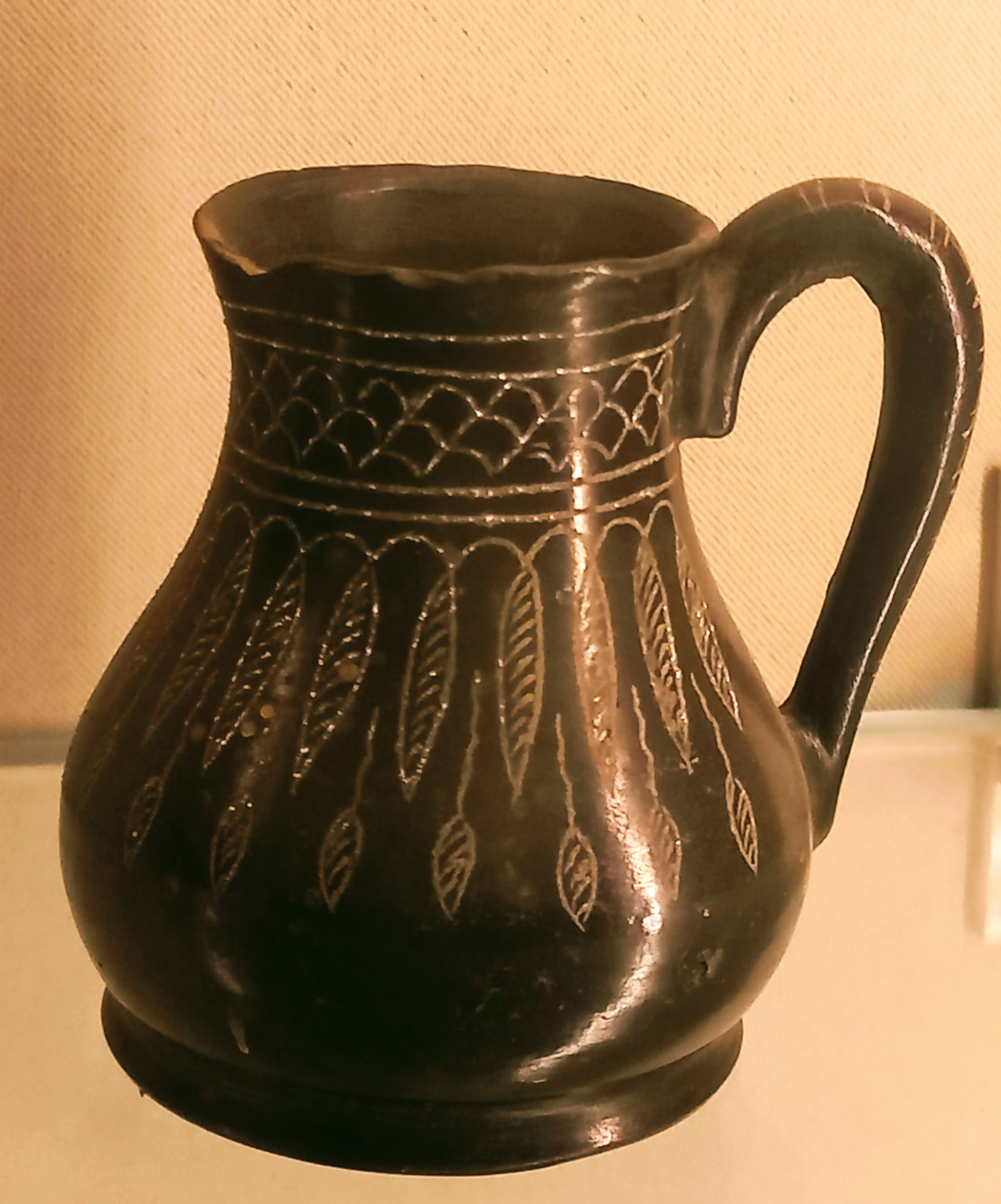
Bidriware

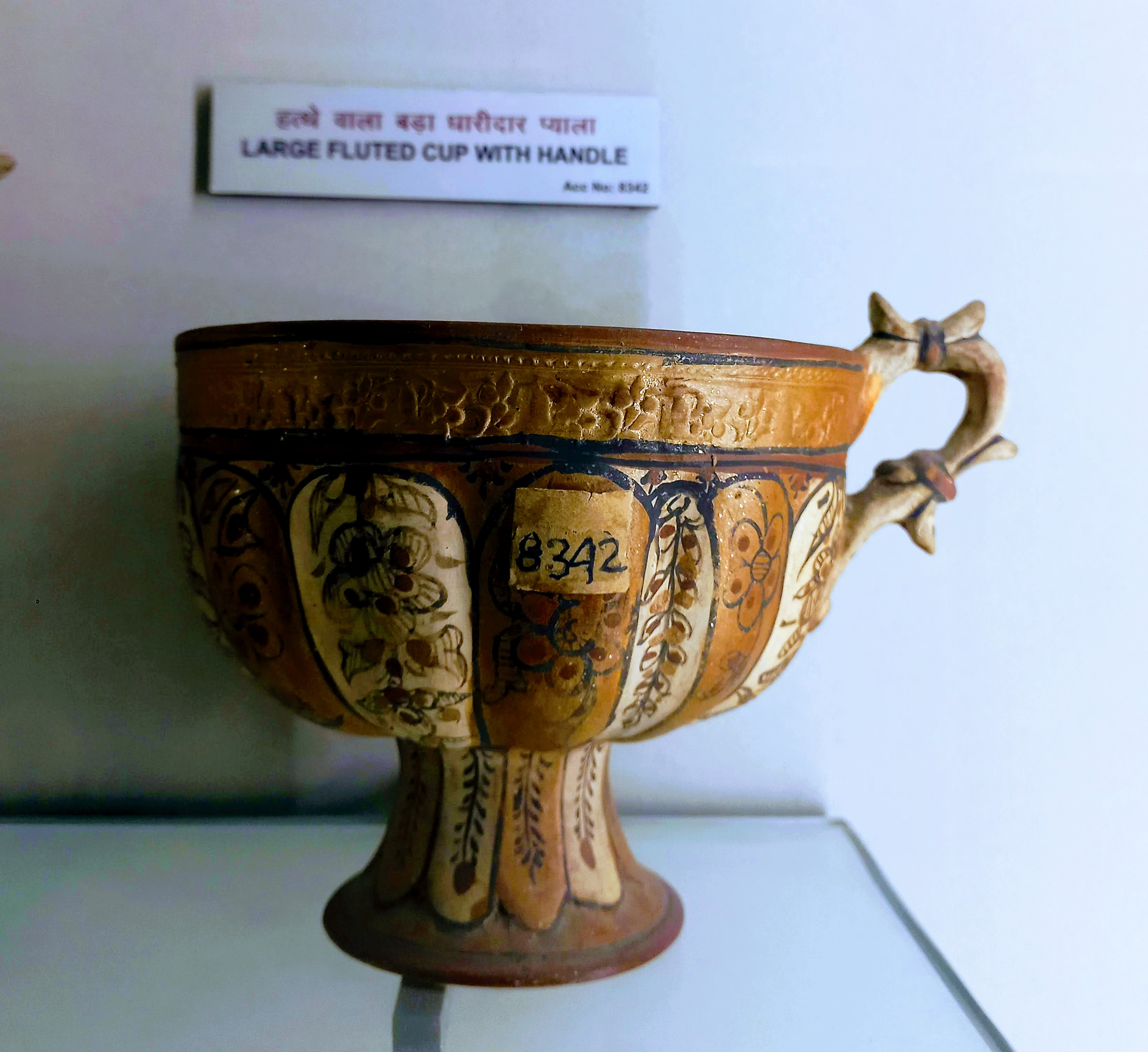
Large Fluted Cup with Handle

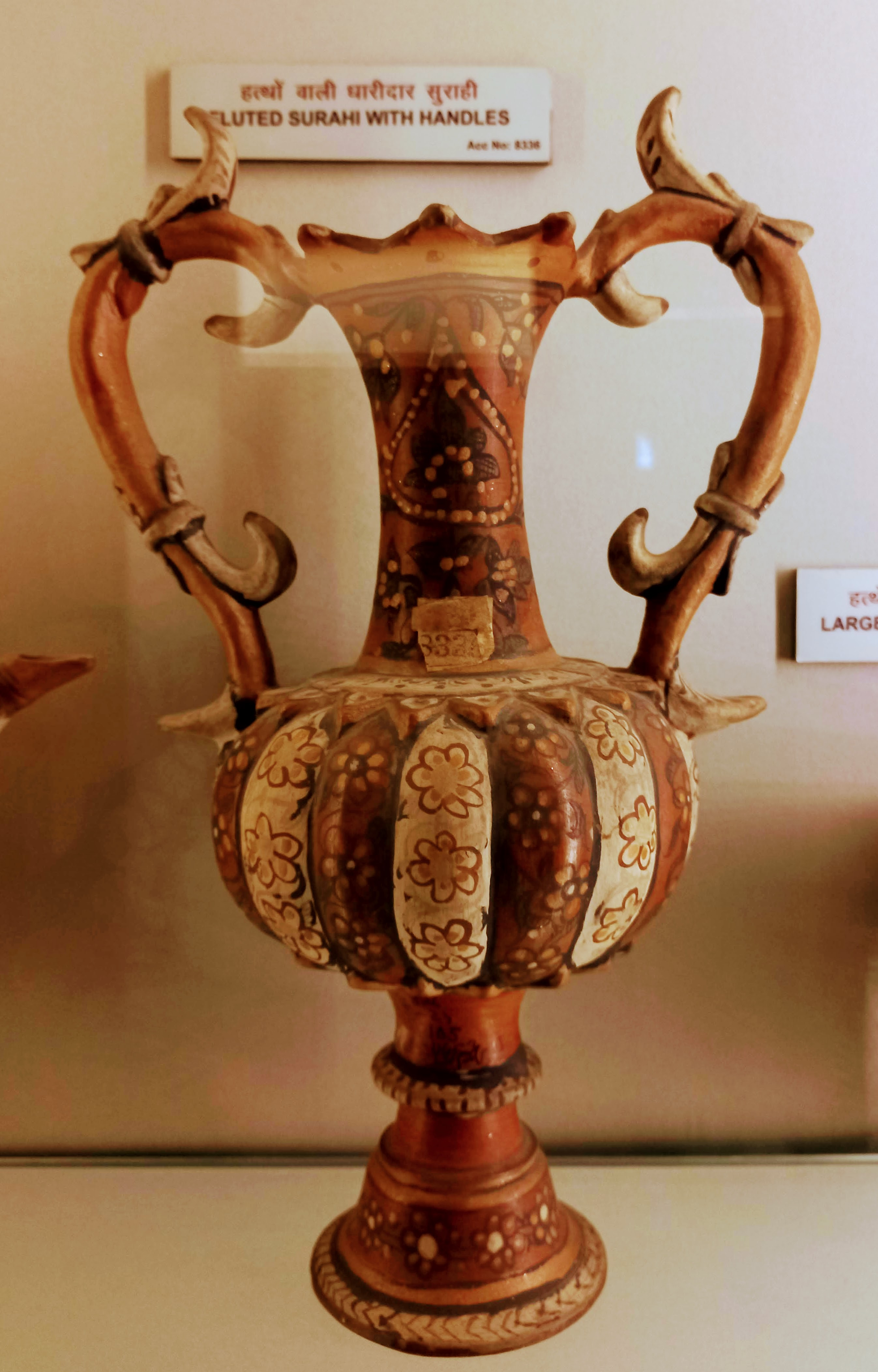
Fluted Surahi with Double Handles

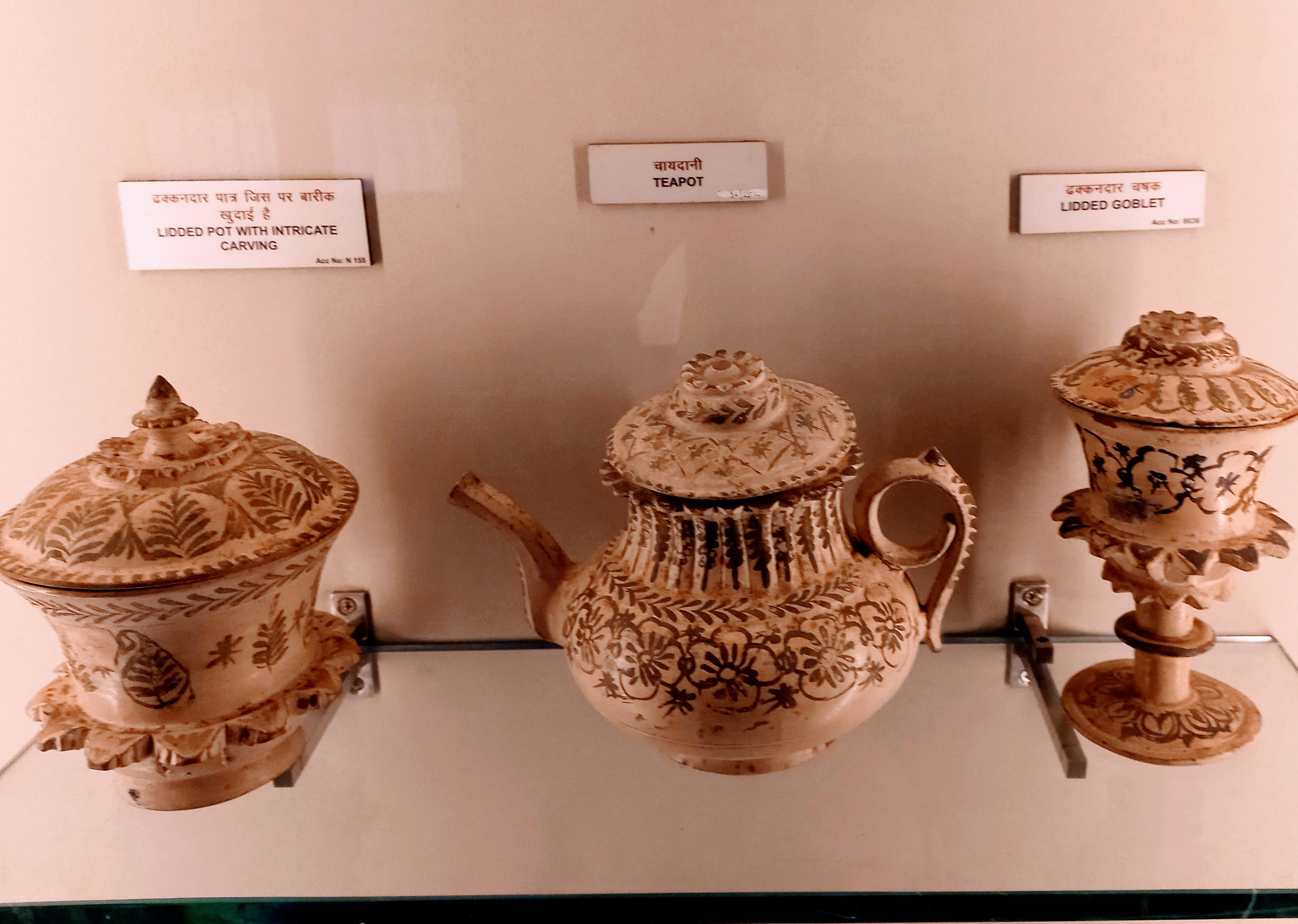
Kagazi Pottery

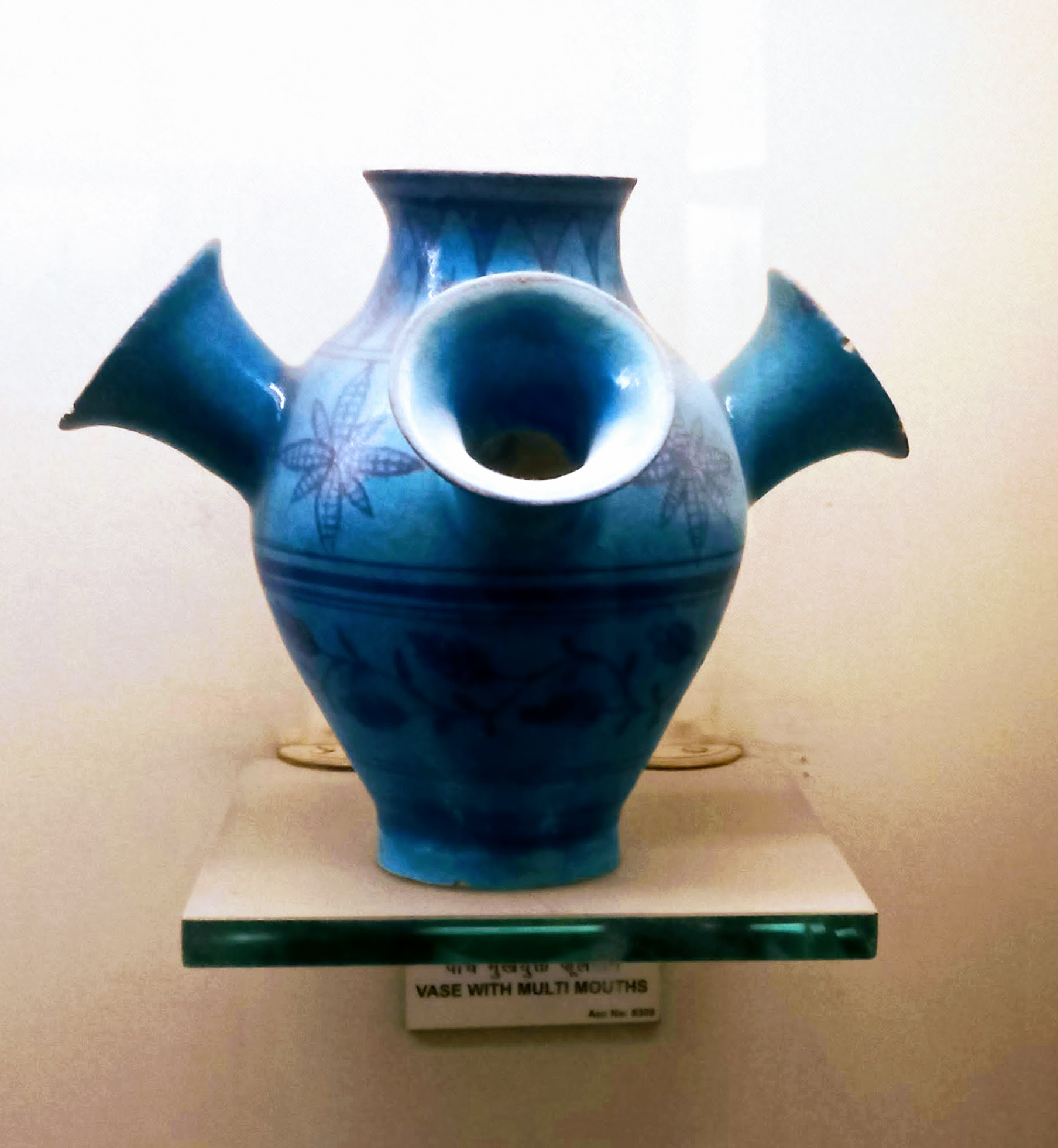
Multi-spout Pot

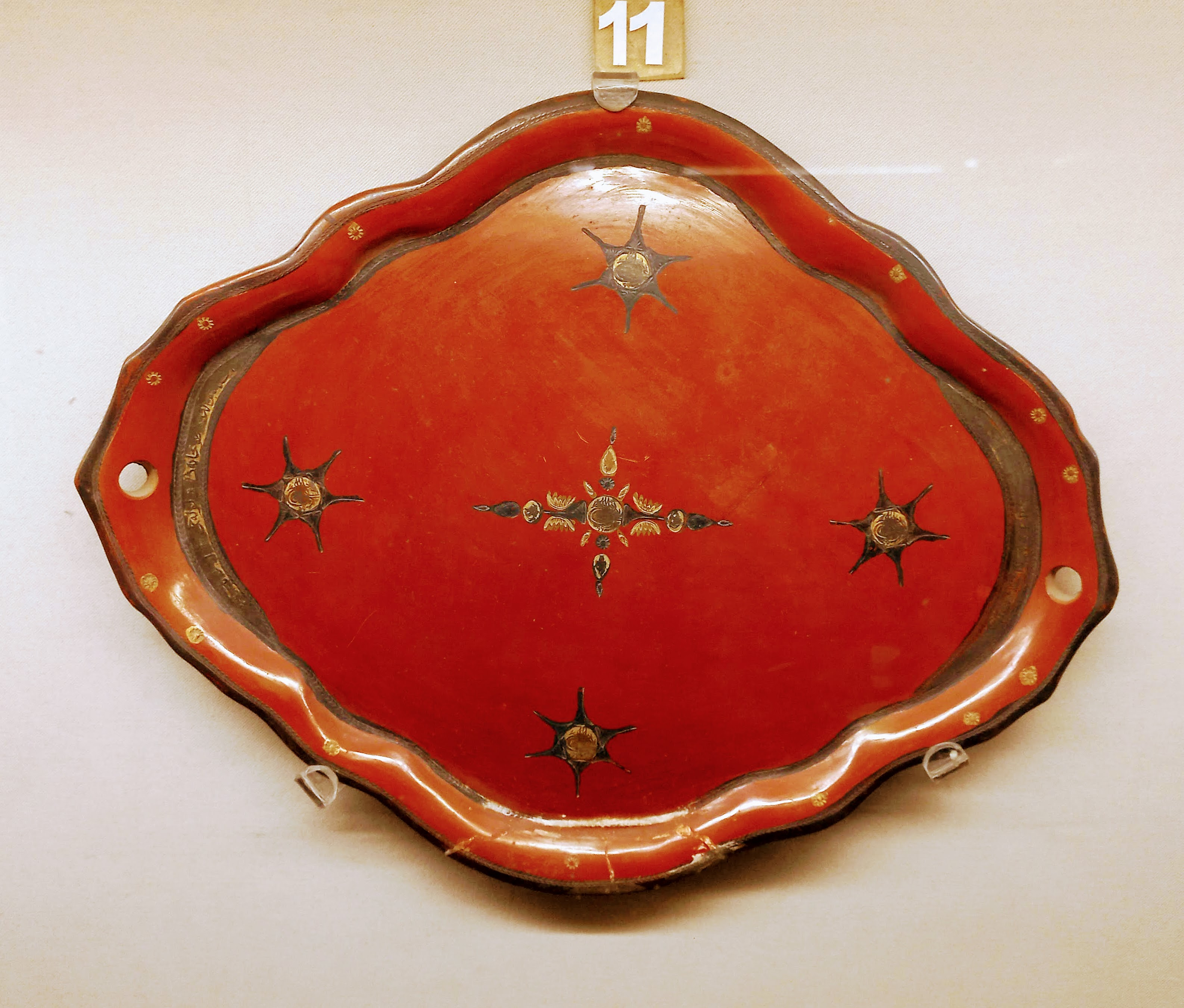
Patan Pottery Tray

=== Madras School ===
The pottery style of Madras School of Art, which originated in Chinglepet, was the first high-temperature glazed pottery that had a semi-porcelain-like clay body and an opaque glaze was created with cobalt and iron colouring to imitate Chineseware, never before produced in India. J. Hunter, who was instrumental in developing the Madras school, looked to China for the technique but used locally available materials and was even more local in his approach towards the designs and motifs. Madras Pottery used Indian deities, Indian floral patterns on coloured clay medallions to adorn the surface of the pottery item.

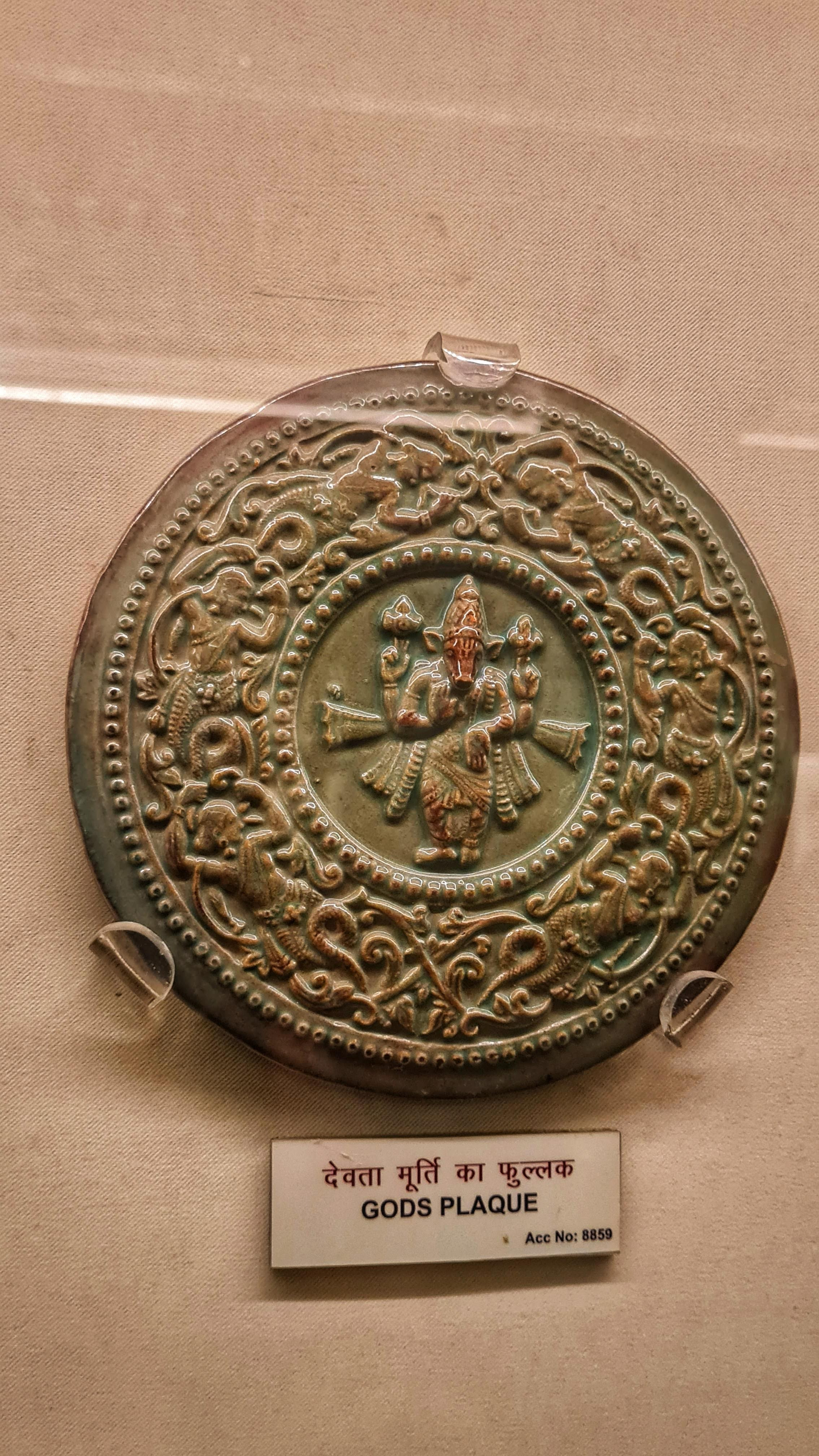
Ganesha Plaque

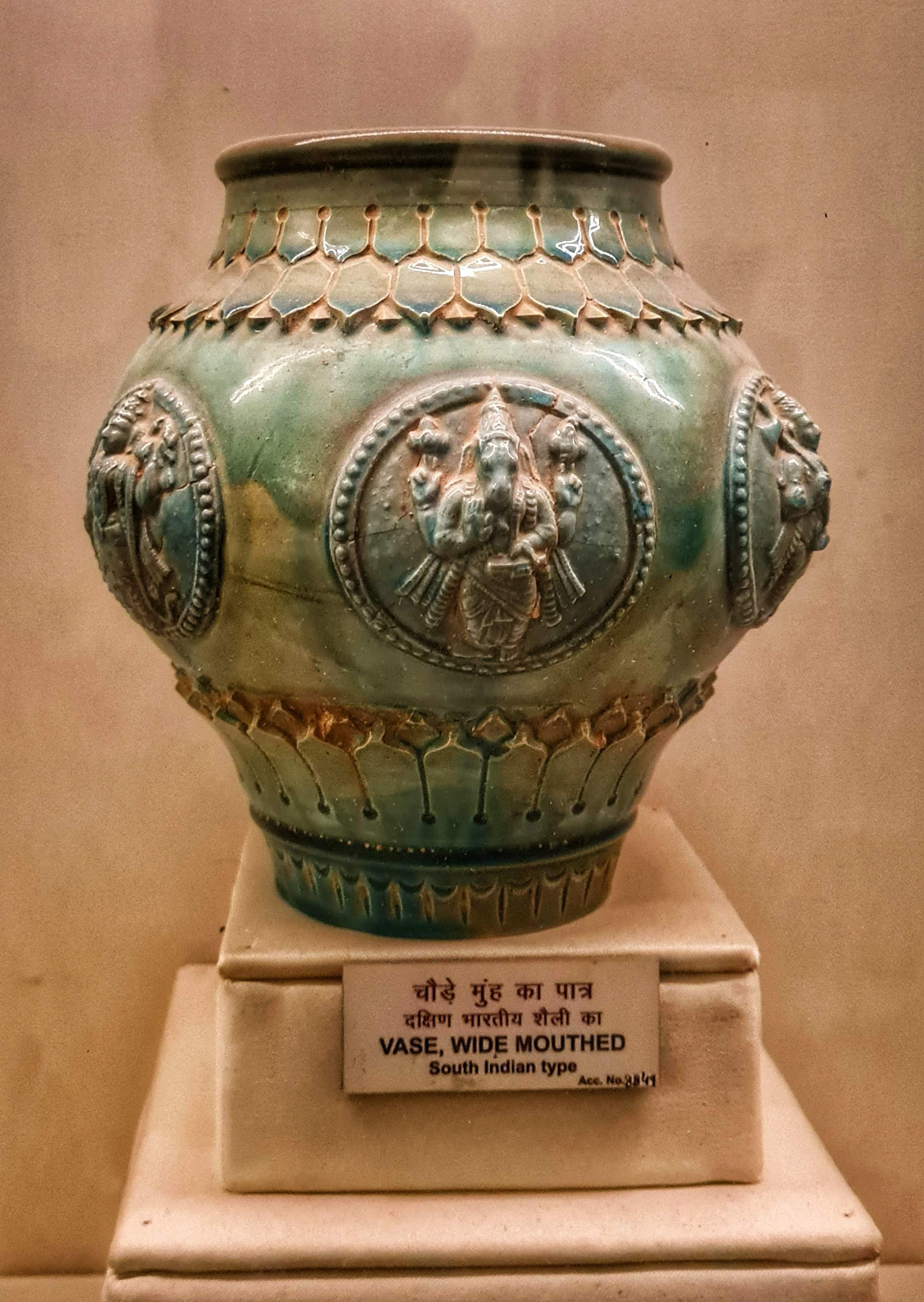
Wide-mouthed Vase

=== Jaipur School ===
Dr Hunter was instrumental in establishing Jaipur School of Art and modeled its pottery department on Madras style. He conducted a geological survey to identify local materials to be used in manufacturing and design of Jaipur pottery. He made use of feldspar, quartz and incorporated art from old blue and white tile work from Amber fort. By 1876, Jaipur Blue Pottery developed as a distinctive style which amalgamated the emerging pottery traditions of Delhi and Rampur. The pottery was made of semi-porcellanous clay with cobalt-blue floral ornamentation on a white or copper-blue base. In the course of time, many experimental designs like mythological figures, hunting scenes, Amber Fort, and Rajput havelis found a place in the pieces exhibited in the collection that housed both decorative and functional pieces. Later pieces also used many colours, other than blue, as background and the later collection has pieces in salmon pink, yellow, brown, and chrome green with more elaborate floral patterns, geometrical designs and ornate frames to showcase the plates.

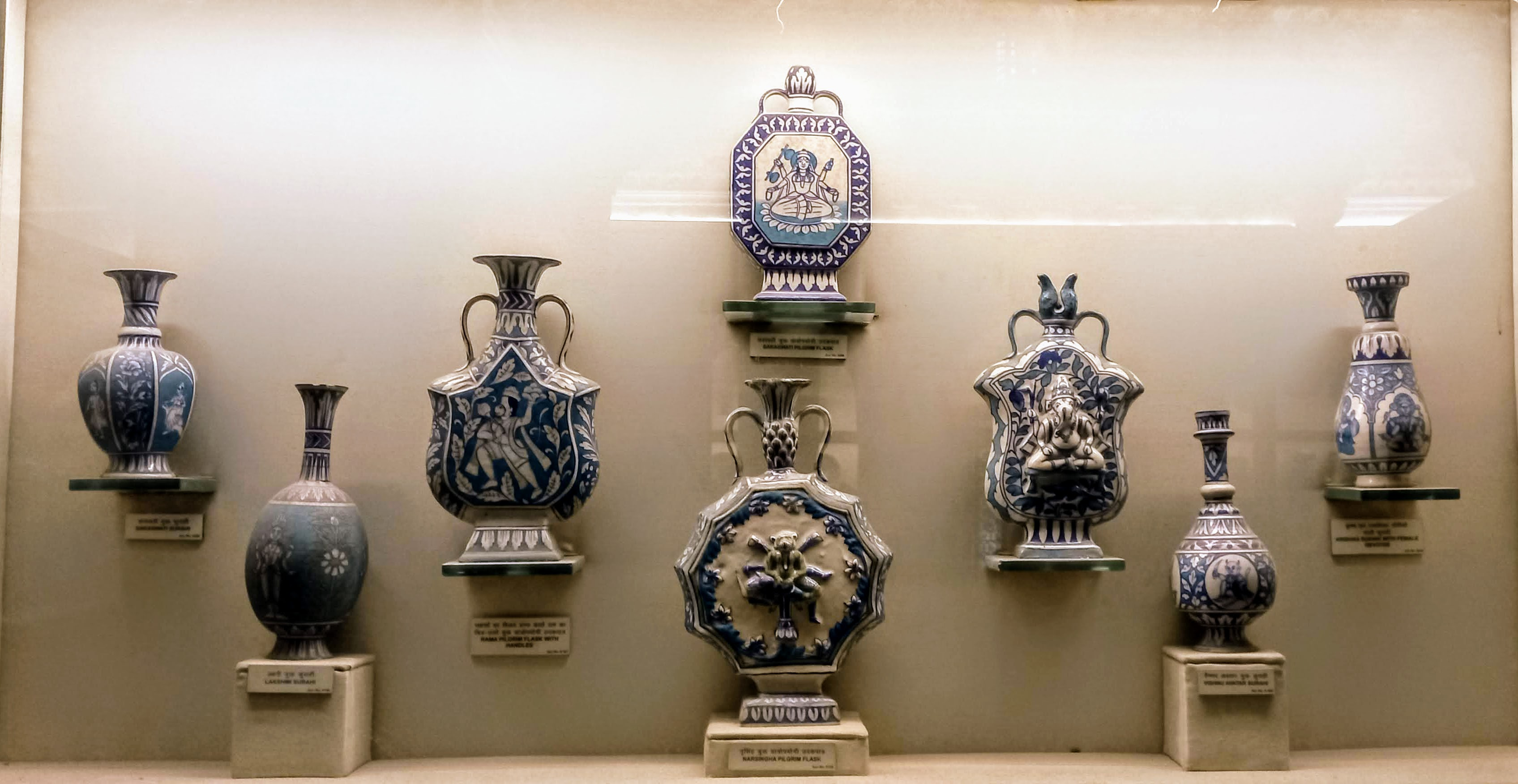
Blue pottery Jaipur collection

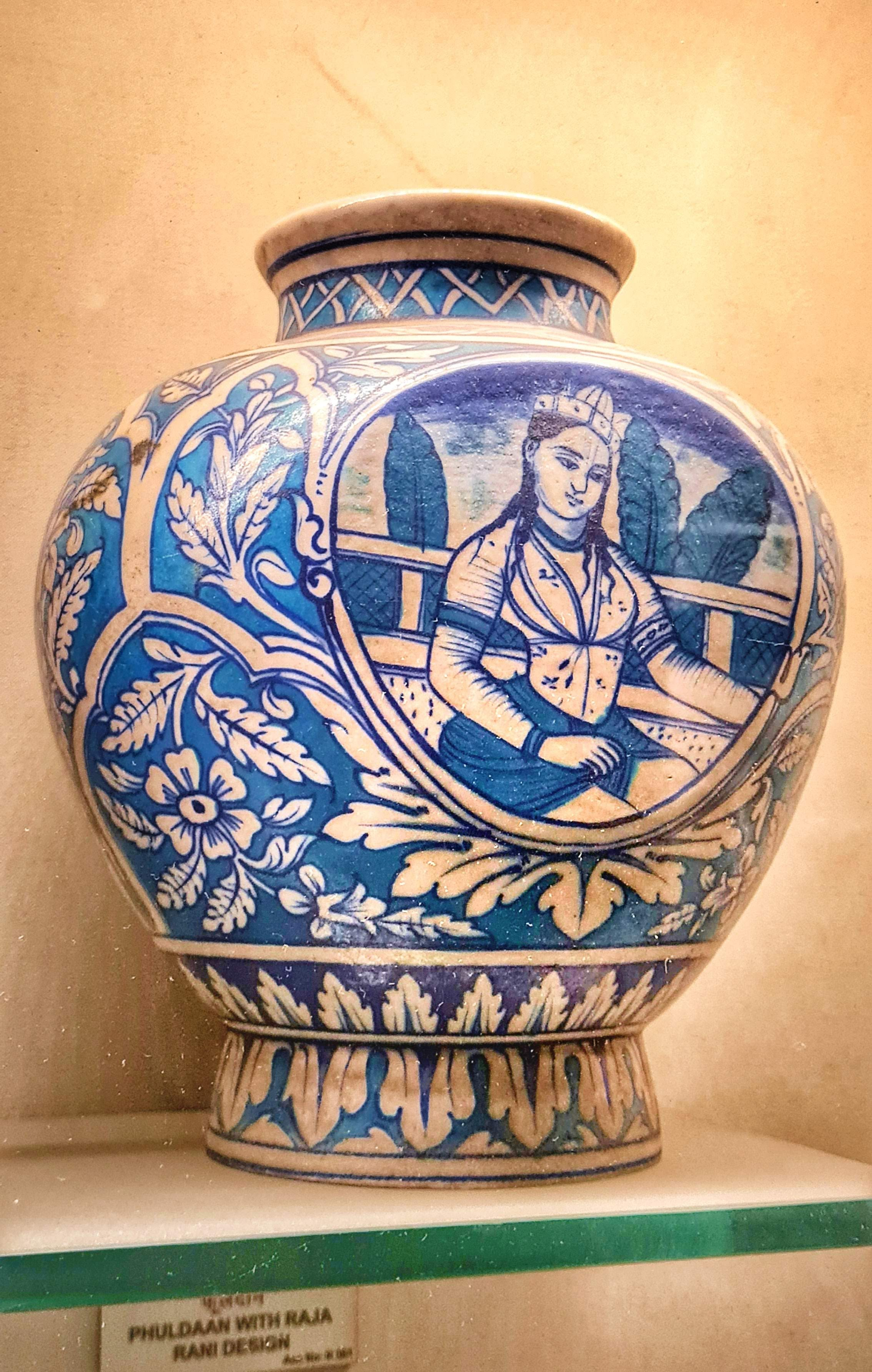
Vase with Raja-Rani design

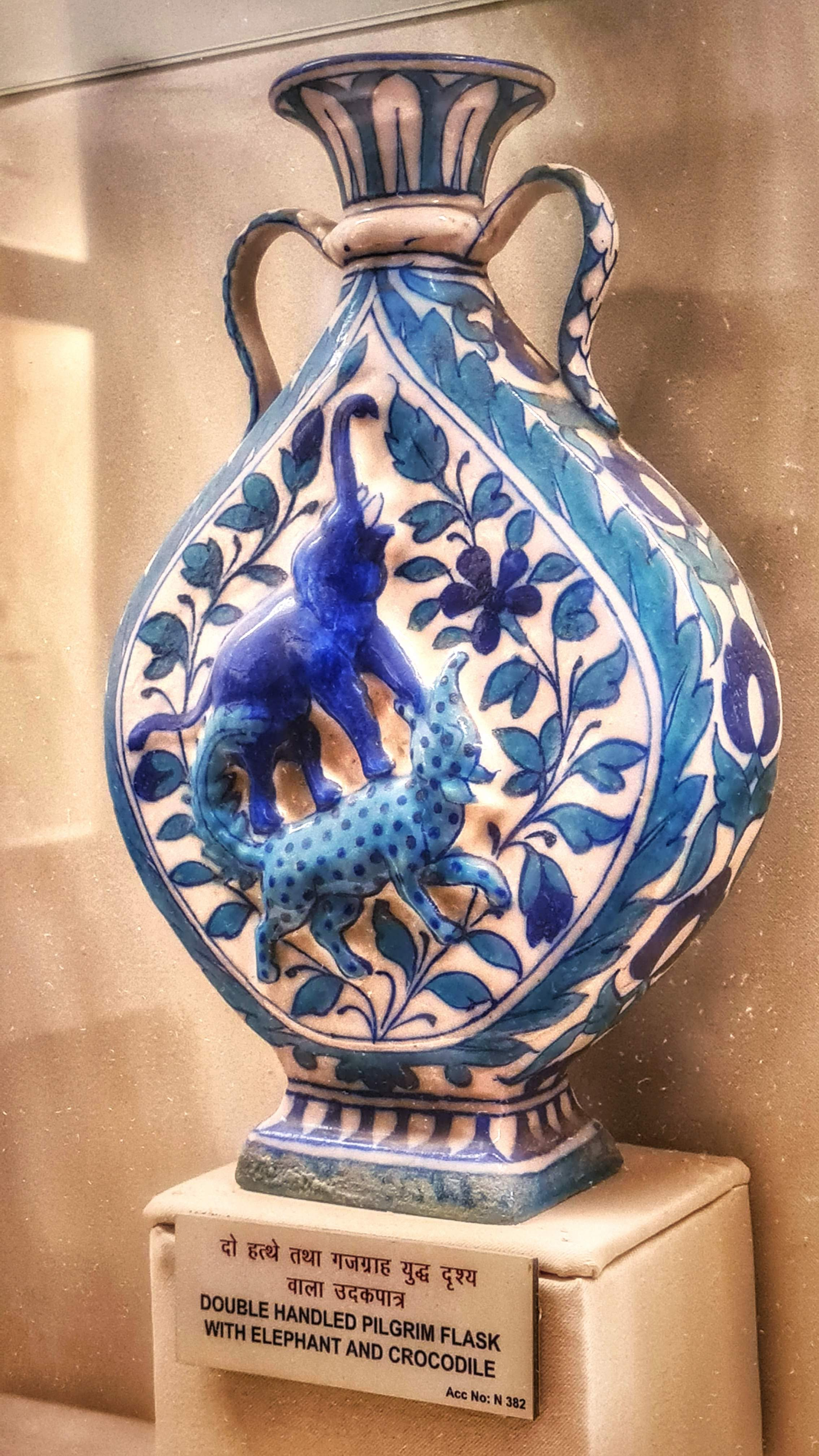
Pilgrim flask

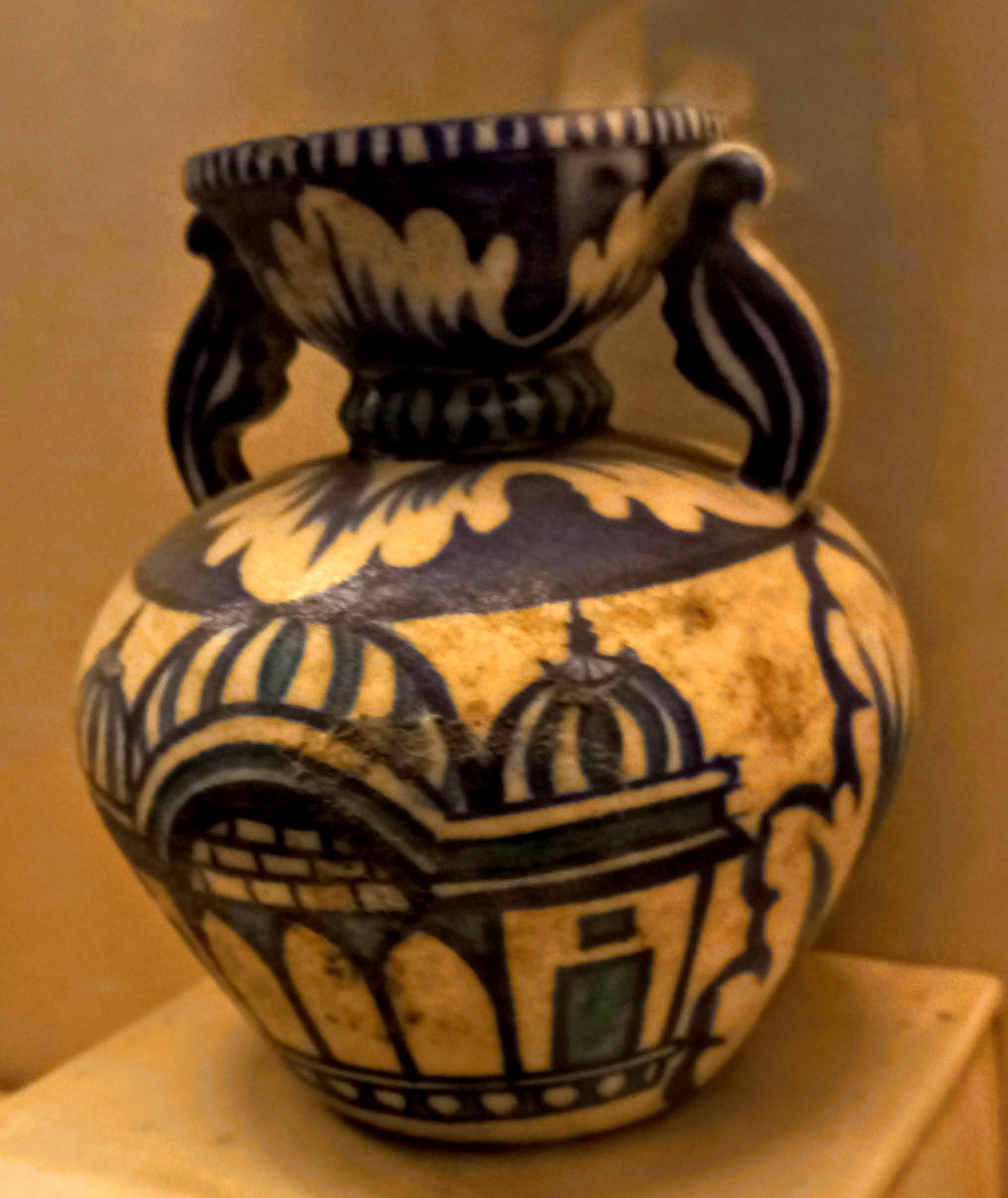
Vase with Rajput architecture motif

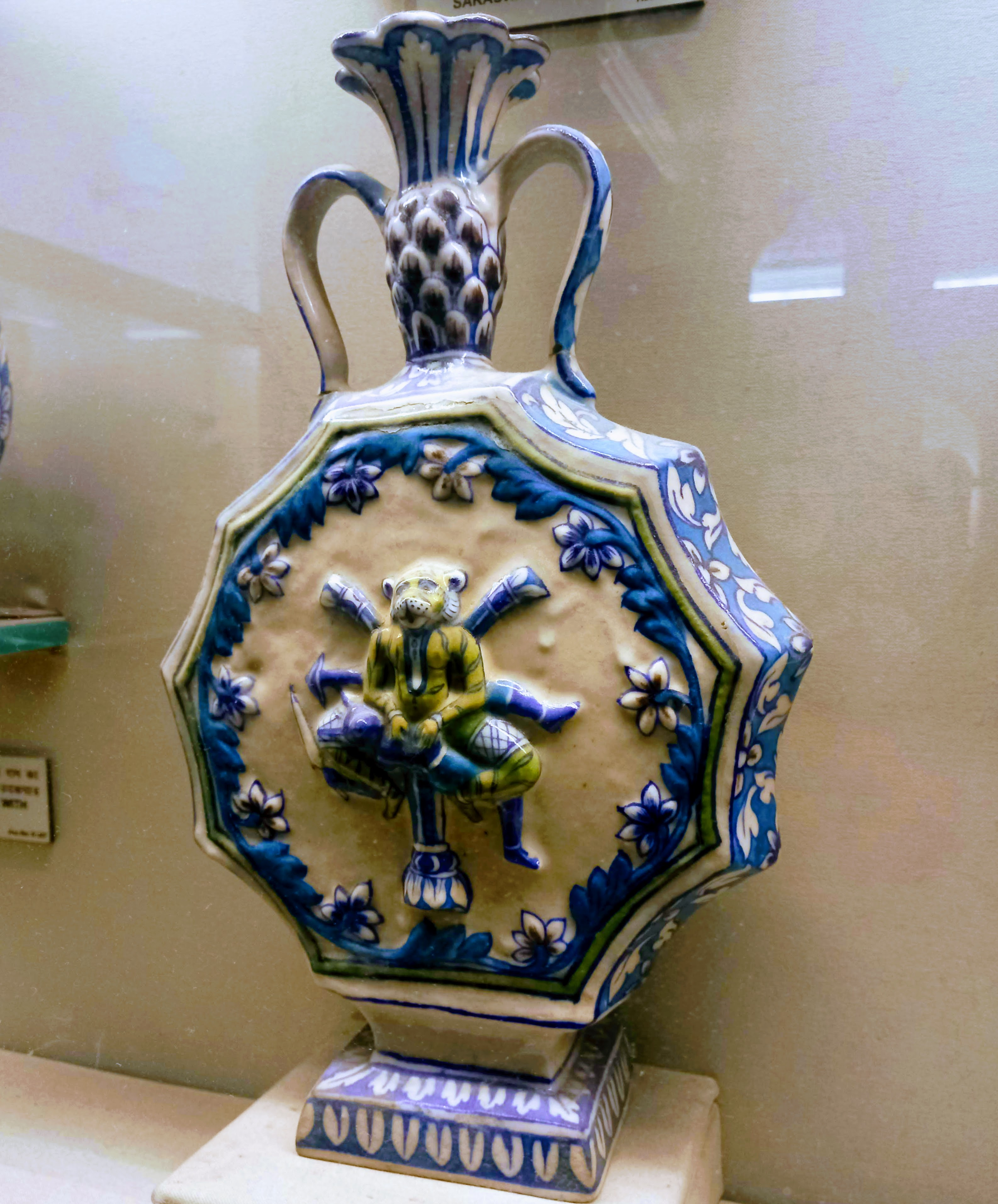
Narsimha flask

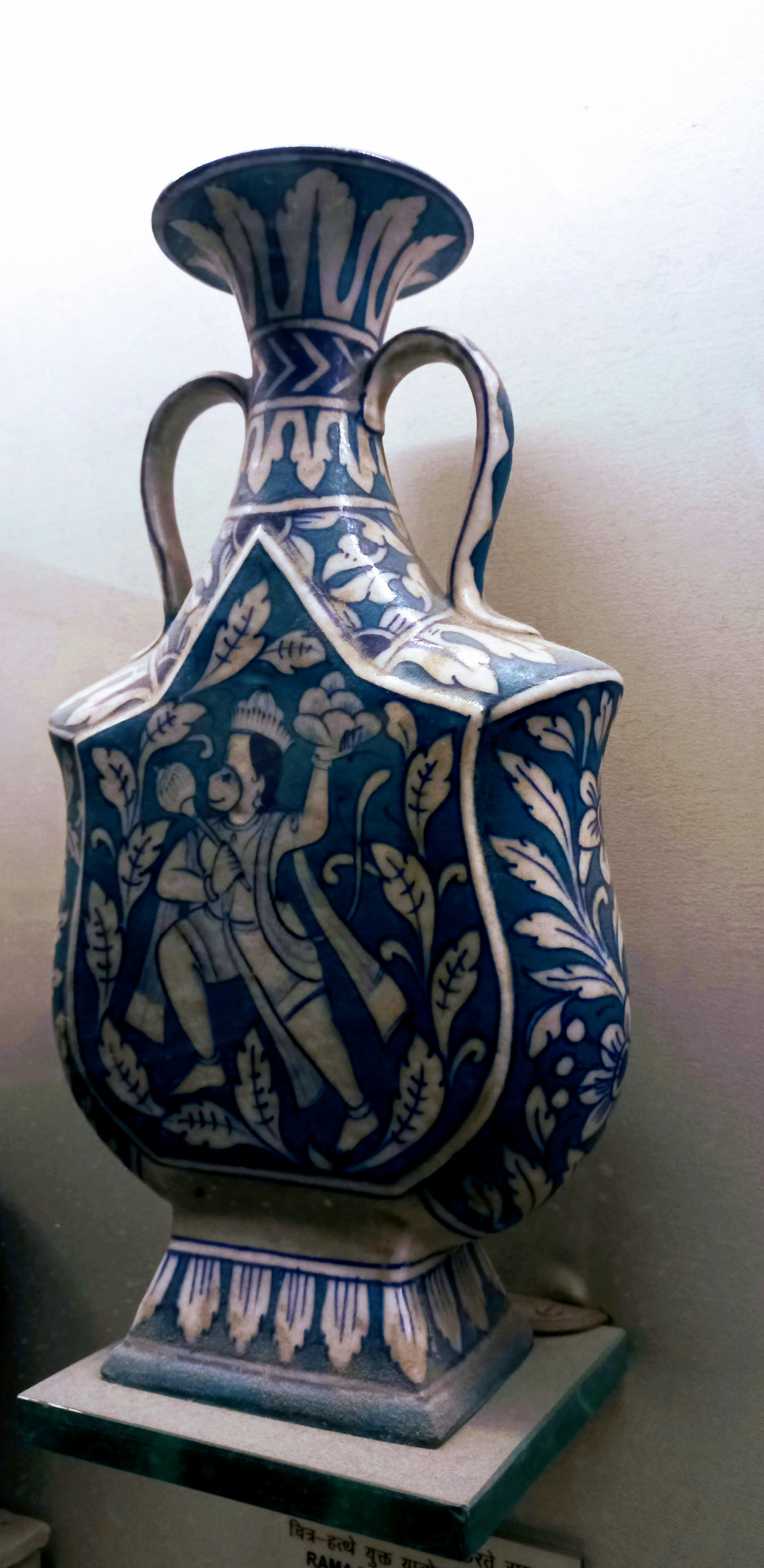
Hanuman flask

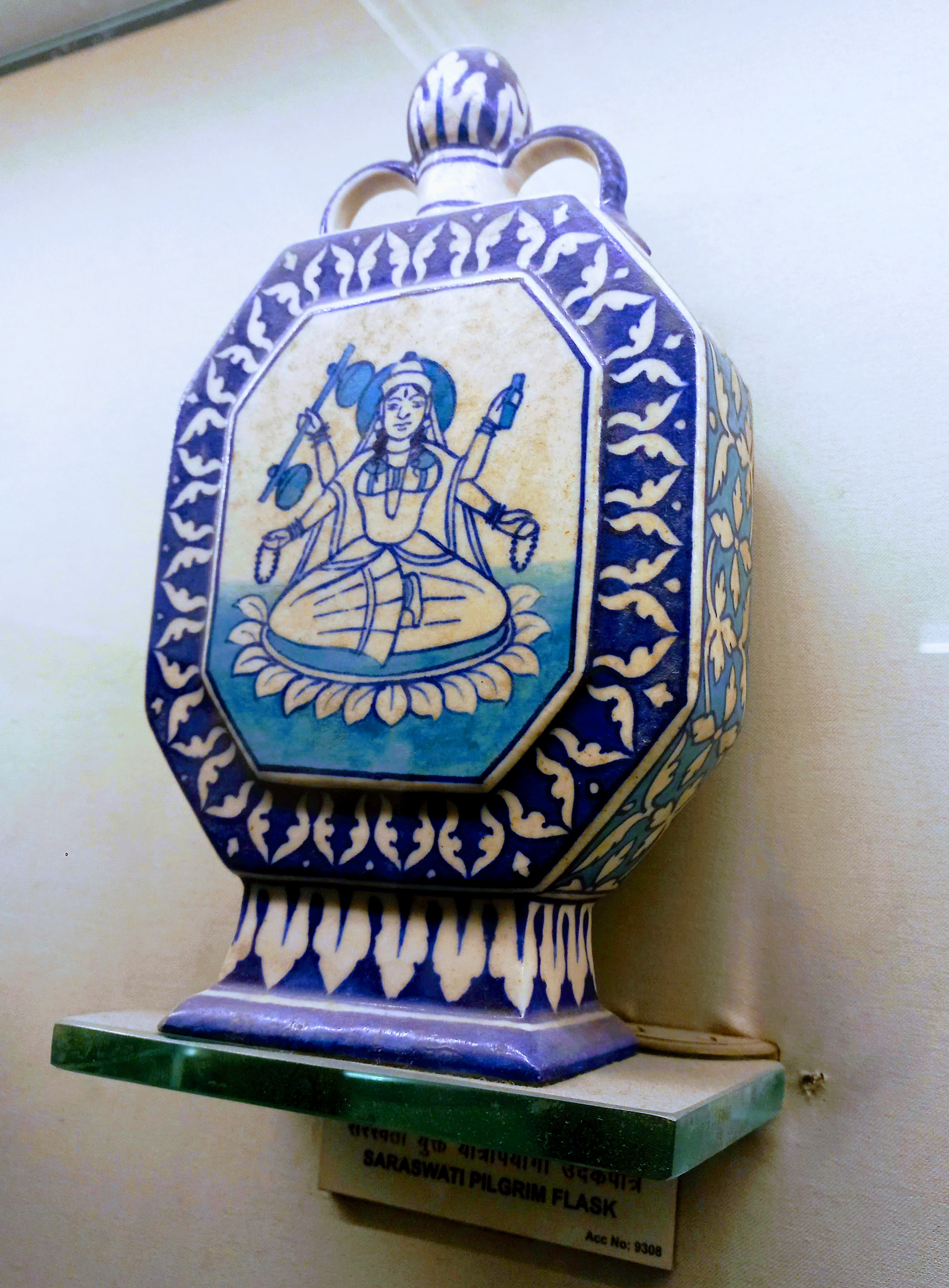
Saraswati pilgrim flask

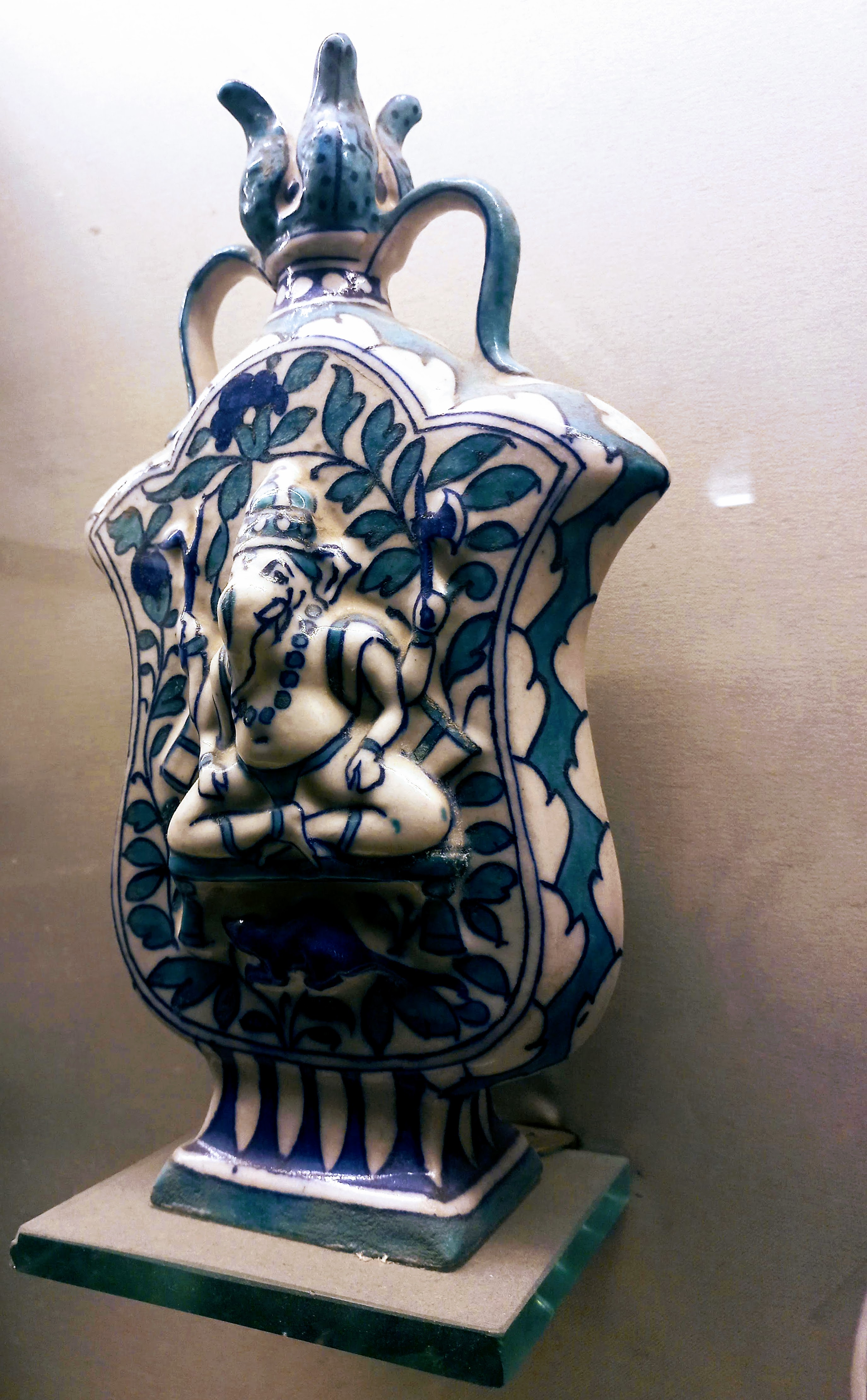
Ganesha flask

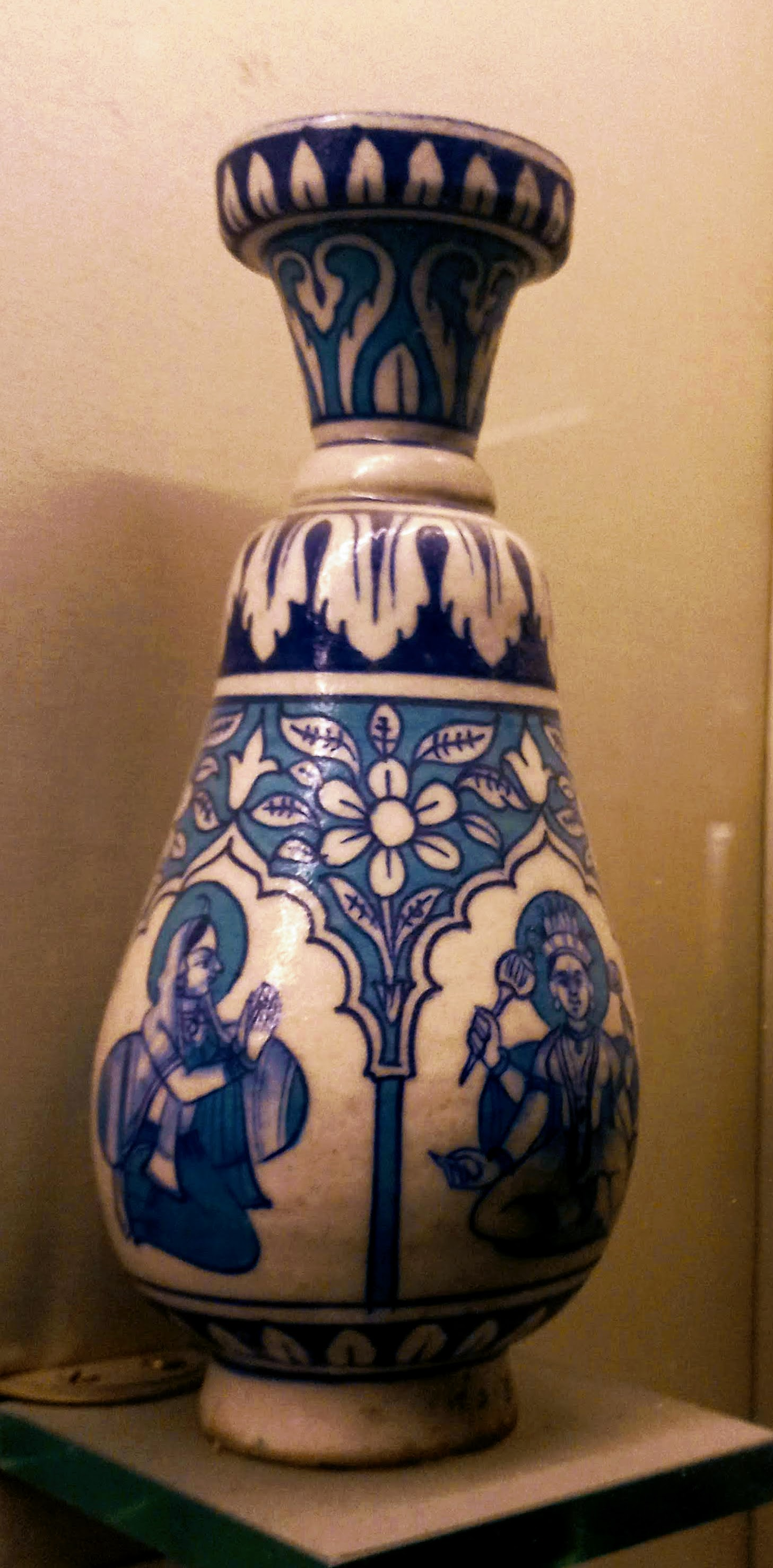
Radha and Krishna Jaipur pottery

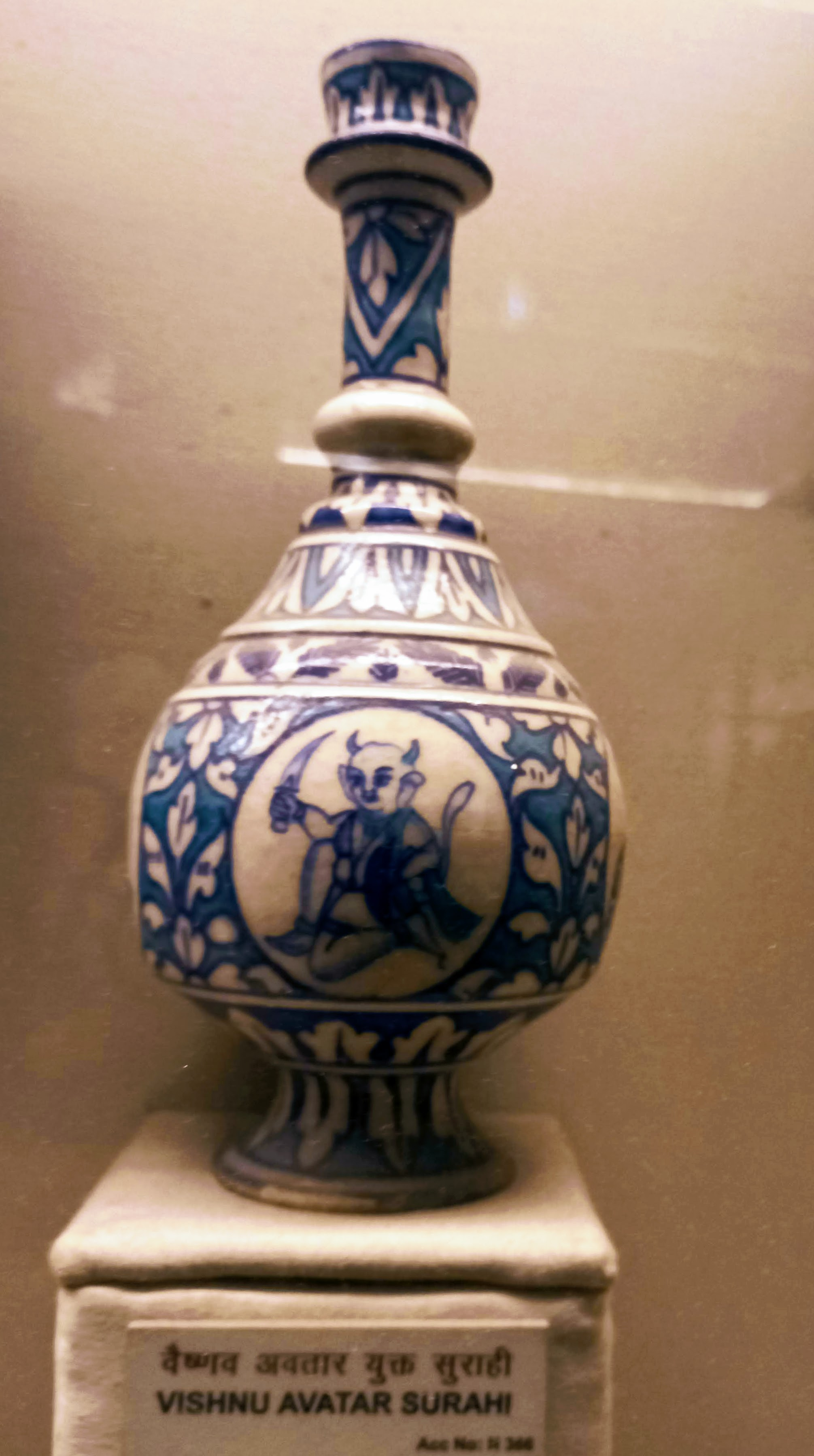
Jaipur blue pottery, Vishnu avatar

=== Bombay School ===
The Bombay School was established through an endowment by the shipping merchant, Sir Jamsetjee Jeejeebhoy. In 1872, George Terry, who was teaching at the school, produced a new hybrid style of pottery that combined the art of Sindh and Multan. It became known as "Wonderland Pottery". Bombay pottery was also called "Terryware" after the name of its founder. It used designs and colours inspired by the murals of the Ajanta Caves. Many of these pieces were housed in the pottery collection of the Albert Hall Museum.

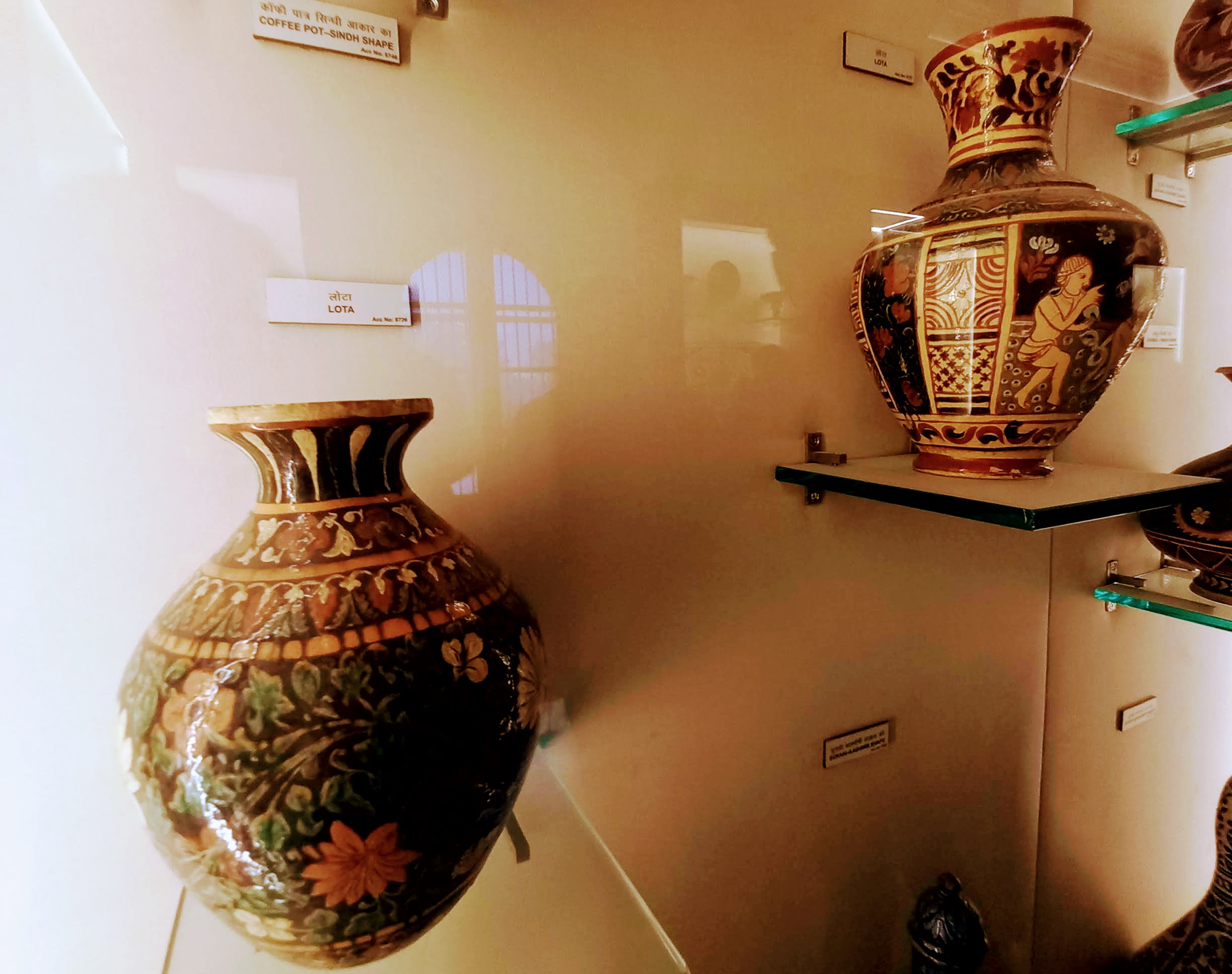
Bombay School Pottery

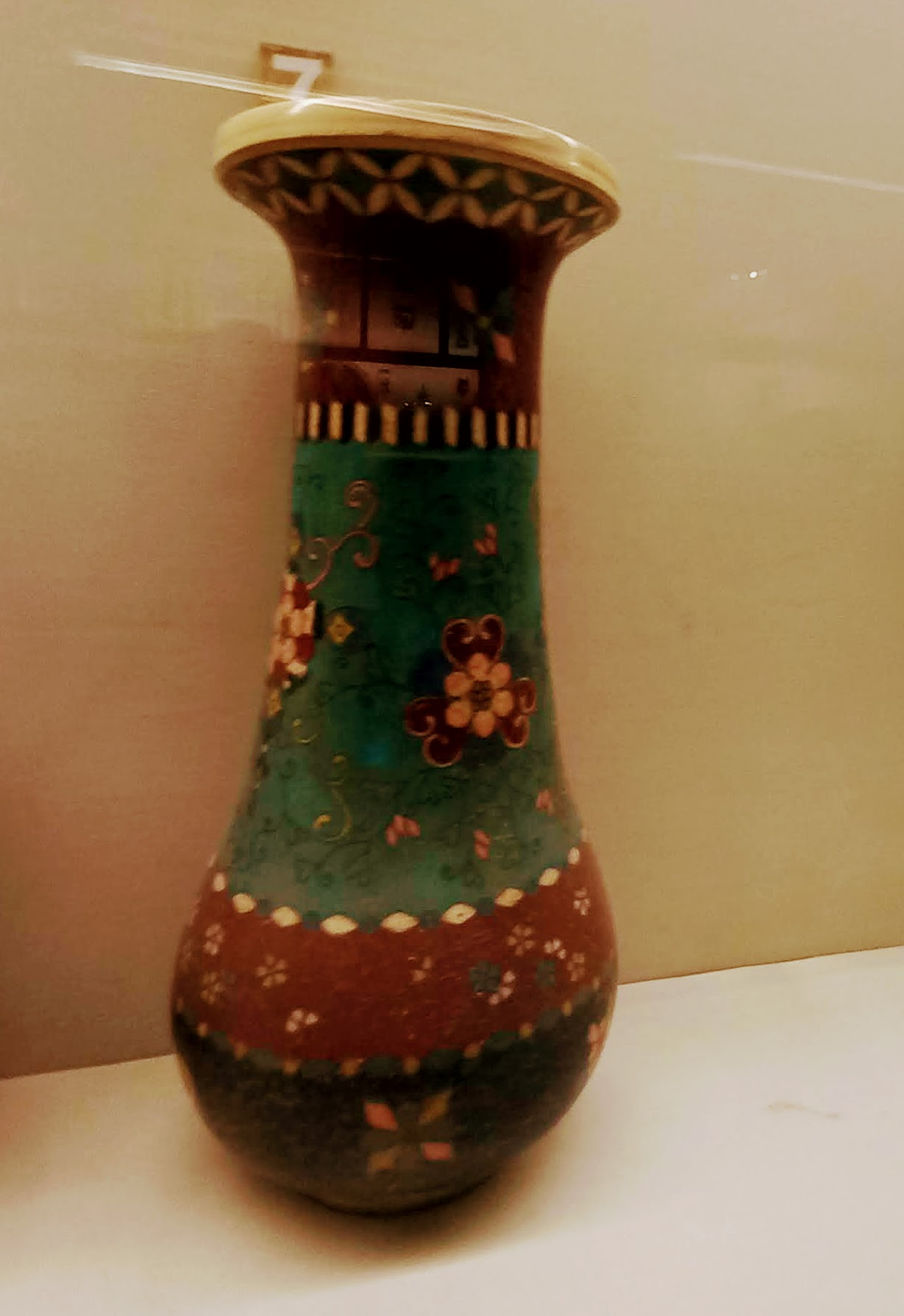
Vase with Floral Motifs

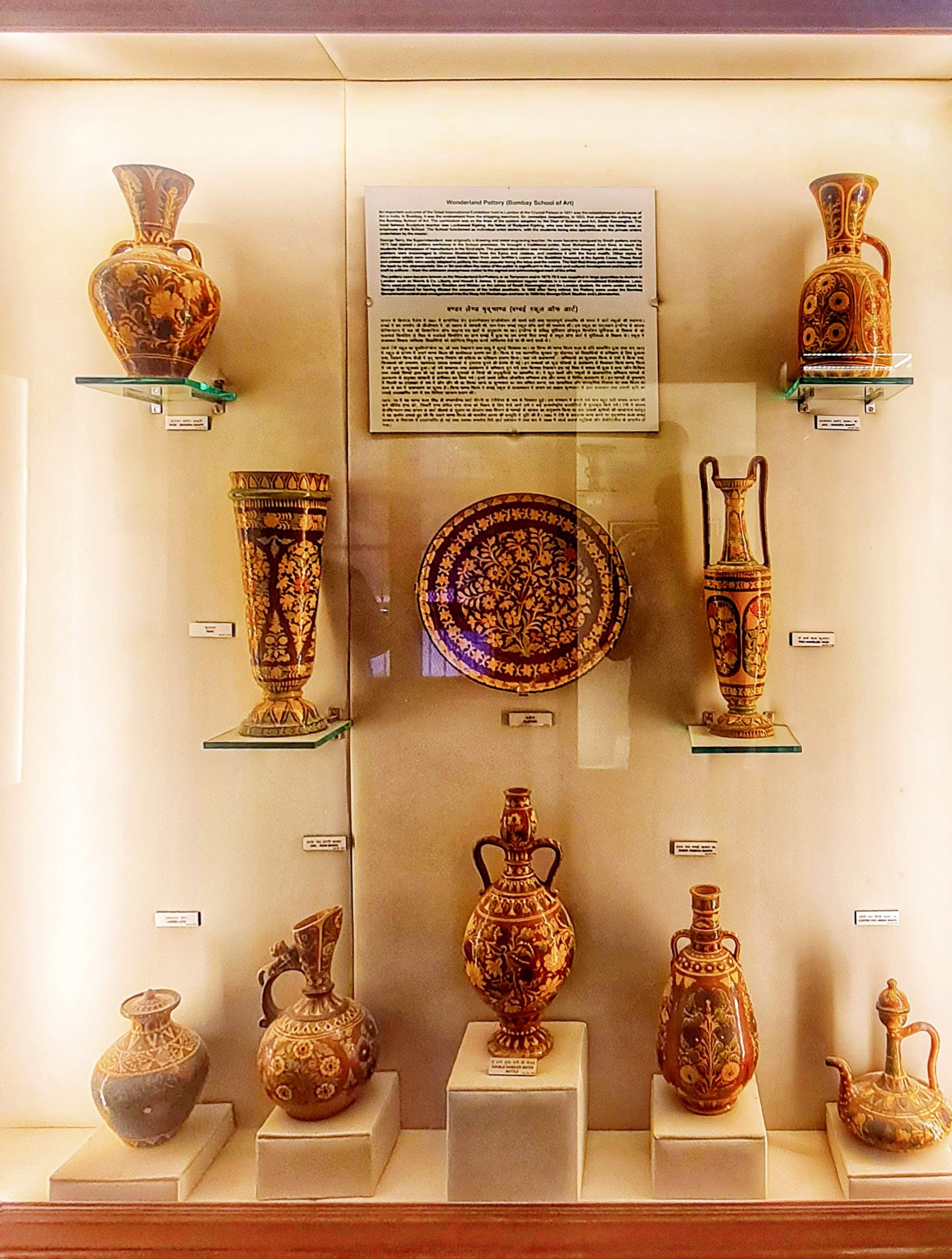
Wonderland Pottery

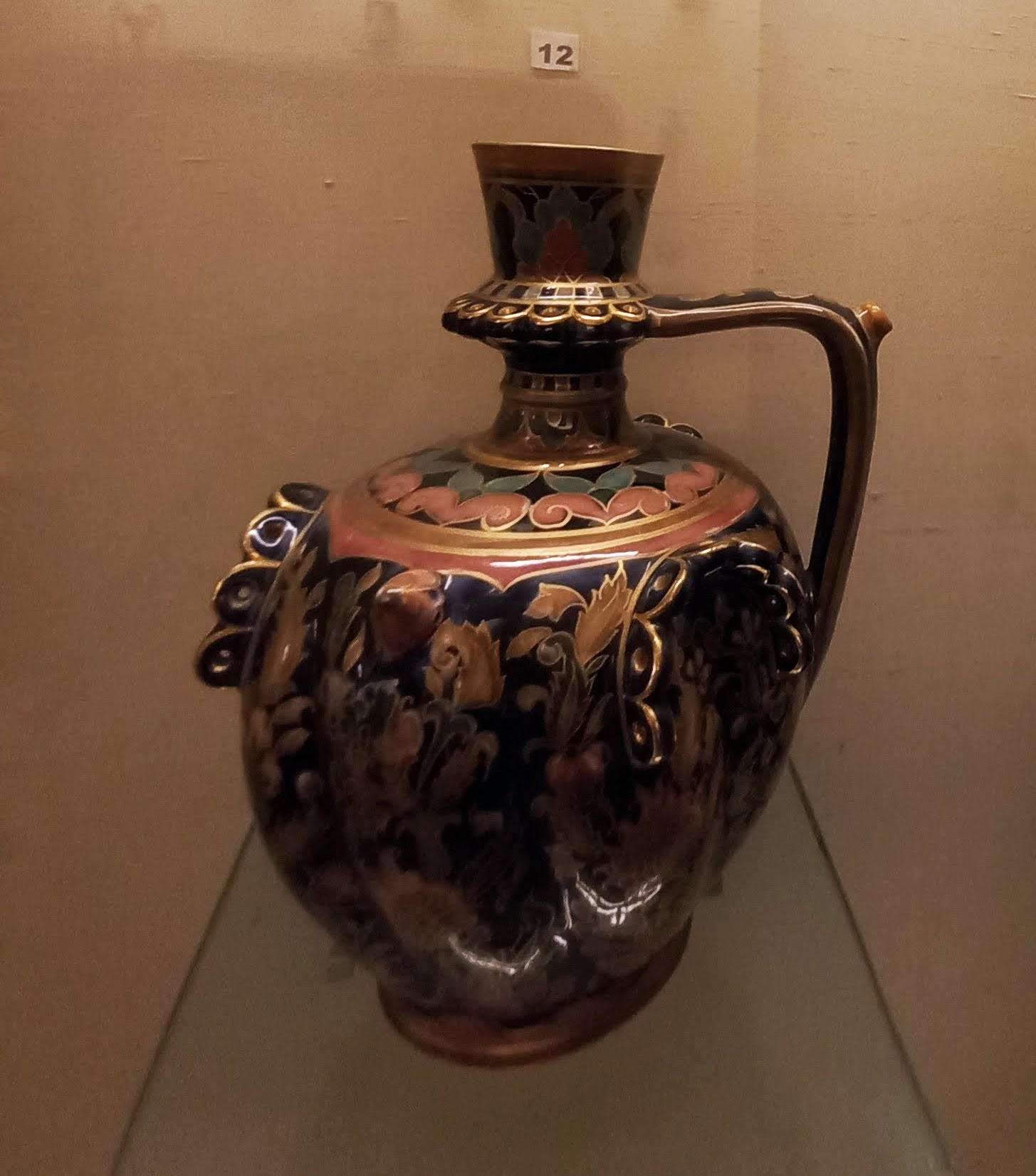
Terryware

== European interventions ==
The collection of pottery at the Albert Hall Museum illustrates European interventions in the late 19th century. In one chalice from Patan in Gujarat, six European-styled dressed figures stand in the arches of its body. Another teapot from Bahawalpur has a European design with an inset lid and cut spout. The intervention was more direct in Bikaner where the wife of the British political agent, Major A. C. Talbot suggested using Bikaner lacquer art on wood on pottery. The result was majestic gold patterns on pottery that appealed to European residents and visitors.

== International collection ==
Persian, Turkish, European, and Japanese Pottery were displayed in the museum to expose the visitors to global developments and craftsmanship. Exhibits include a large Satsuma vase created by the Kinkosan family of Kyoto in Japan, belonging to the Meiji period. It has elaborate patterns gilded and enamelled in gold and vivid colours that depict samurais and geishas and scenes of their lives. Doulton and Milton potteries, Queen's Ware, signature pieces of the Lambeth School of Art showcase English ceramics of the time. Ipsen Pottery by the Danish potter is represented by a pair of Amphora vases with classical Greco-Roman motifs.

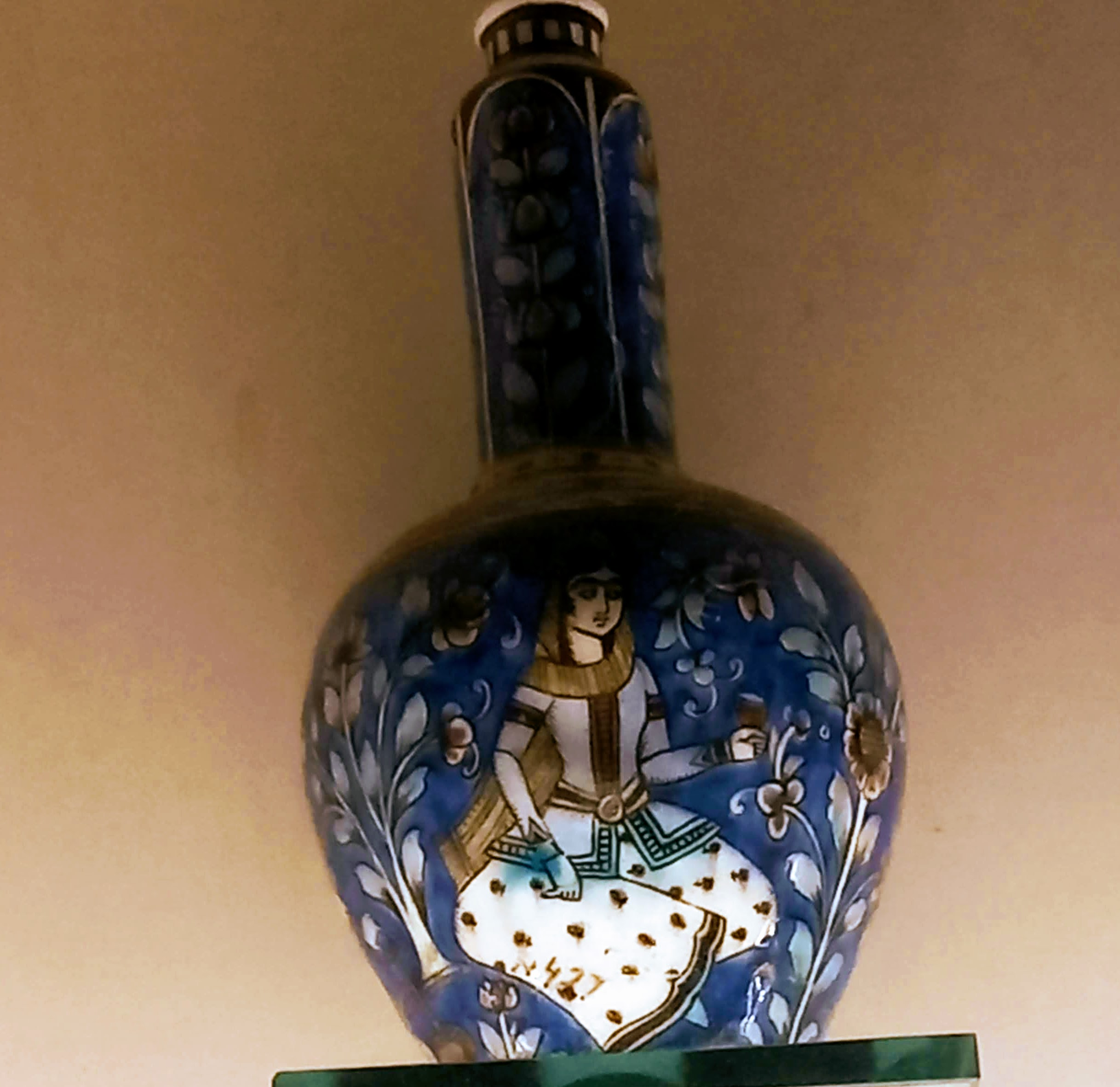
Persian Pottery

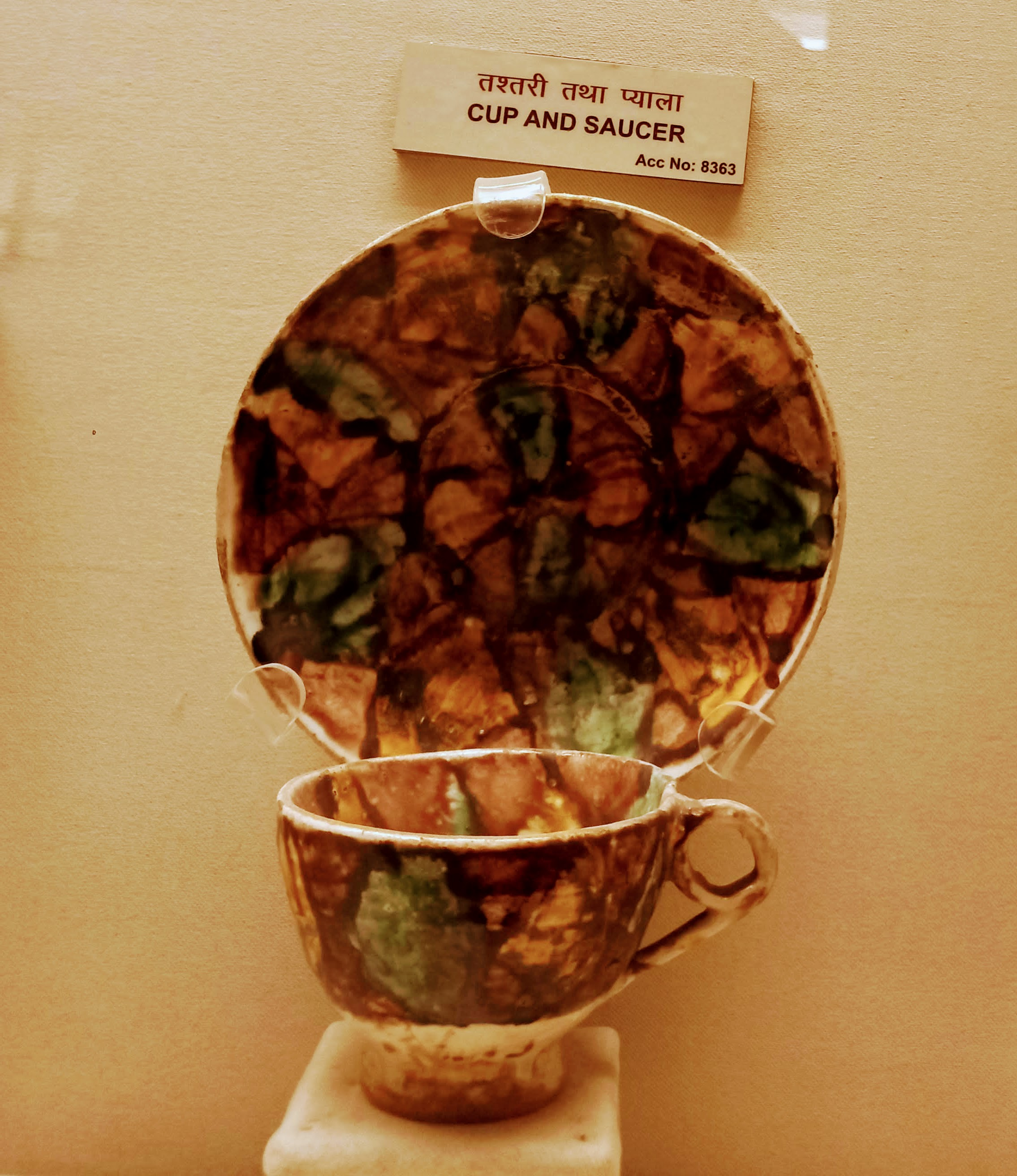
Cup and Saucer

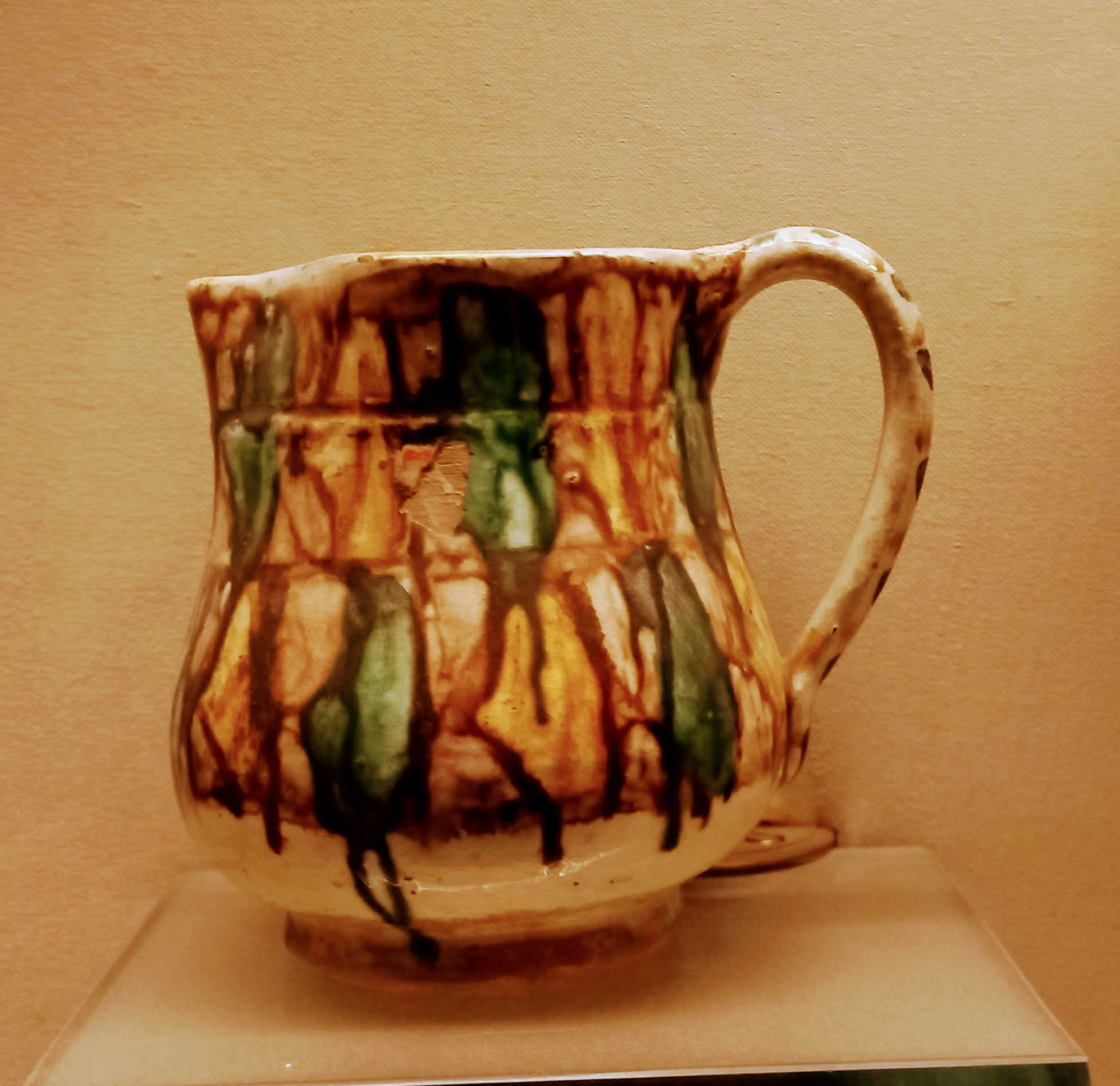
Milk jug

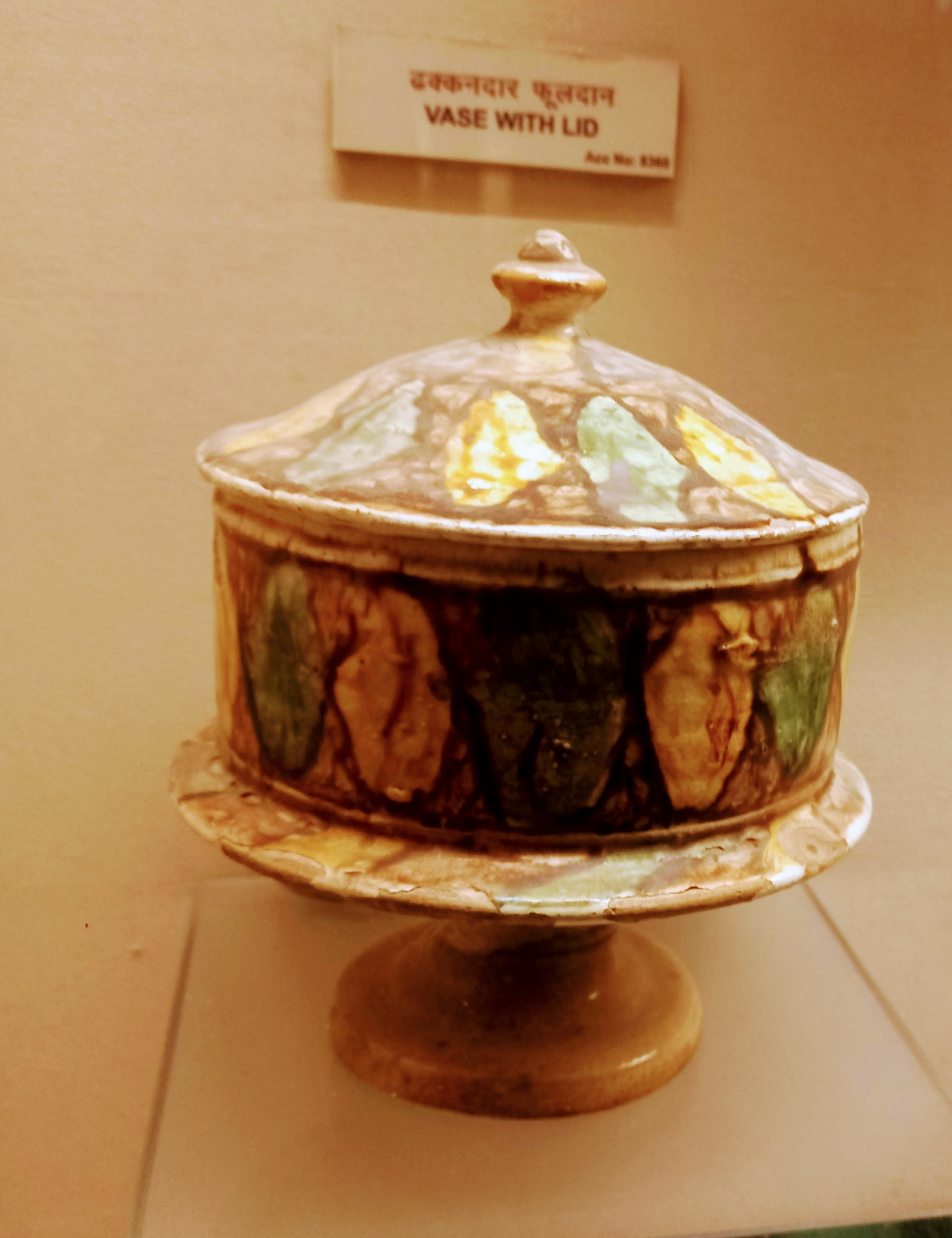
Lidded Box

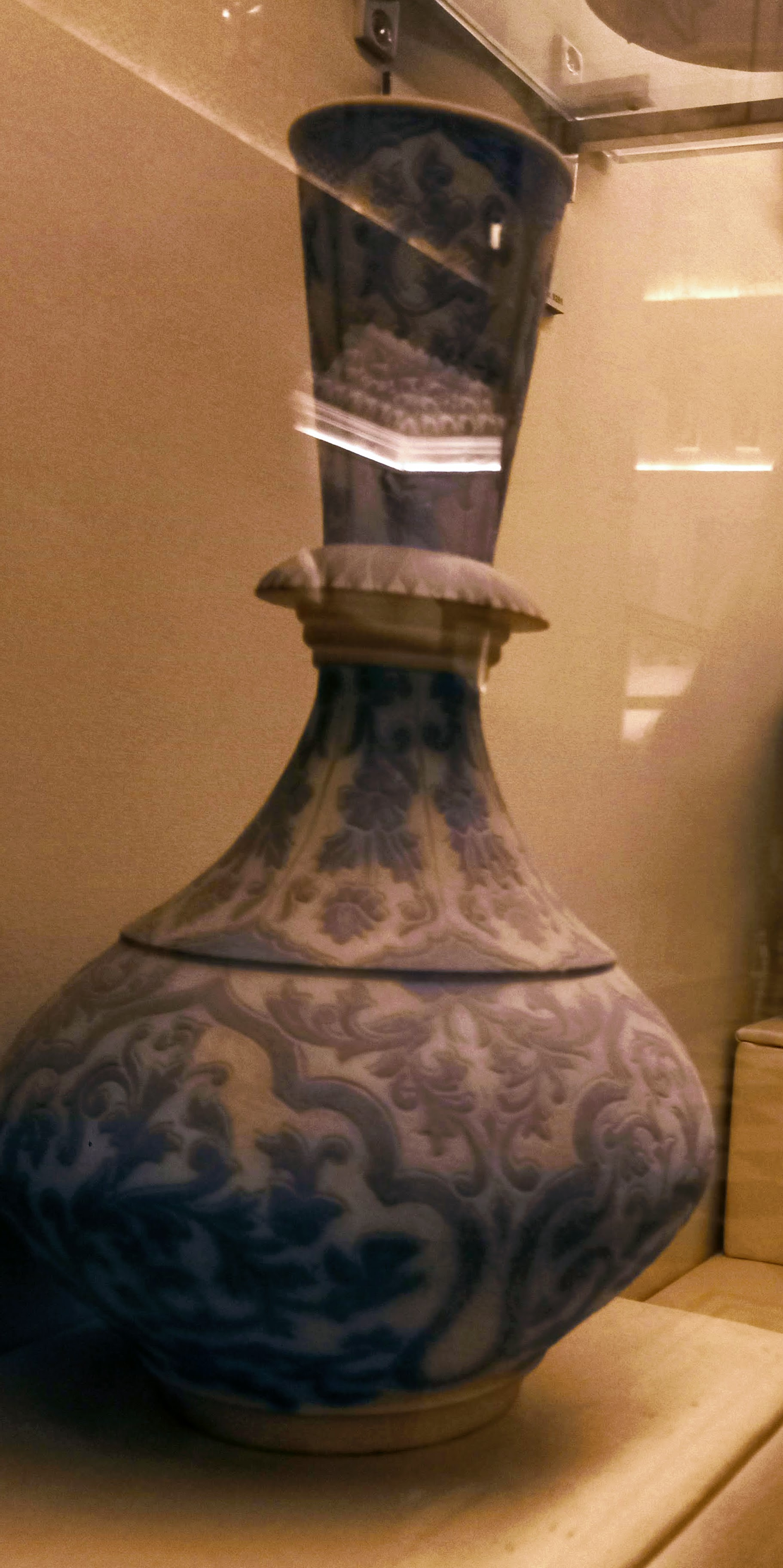
Blue Pottery

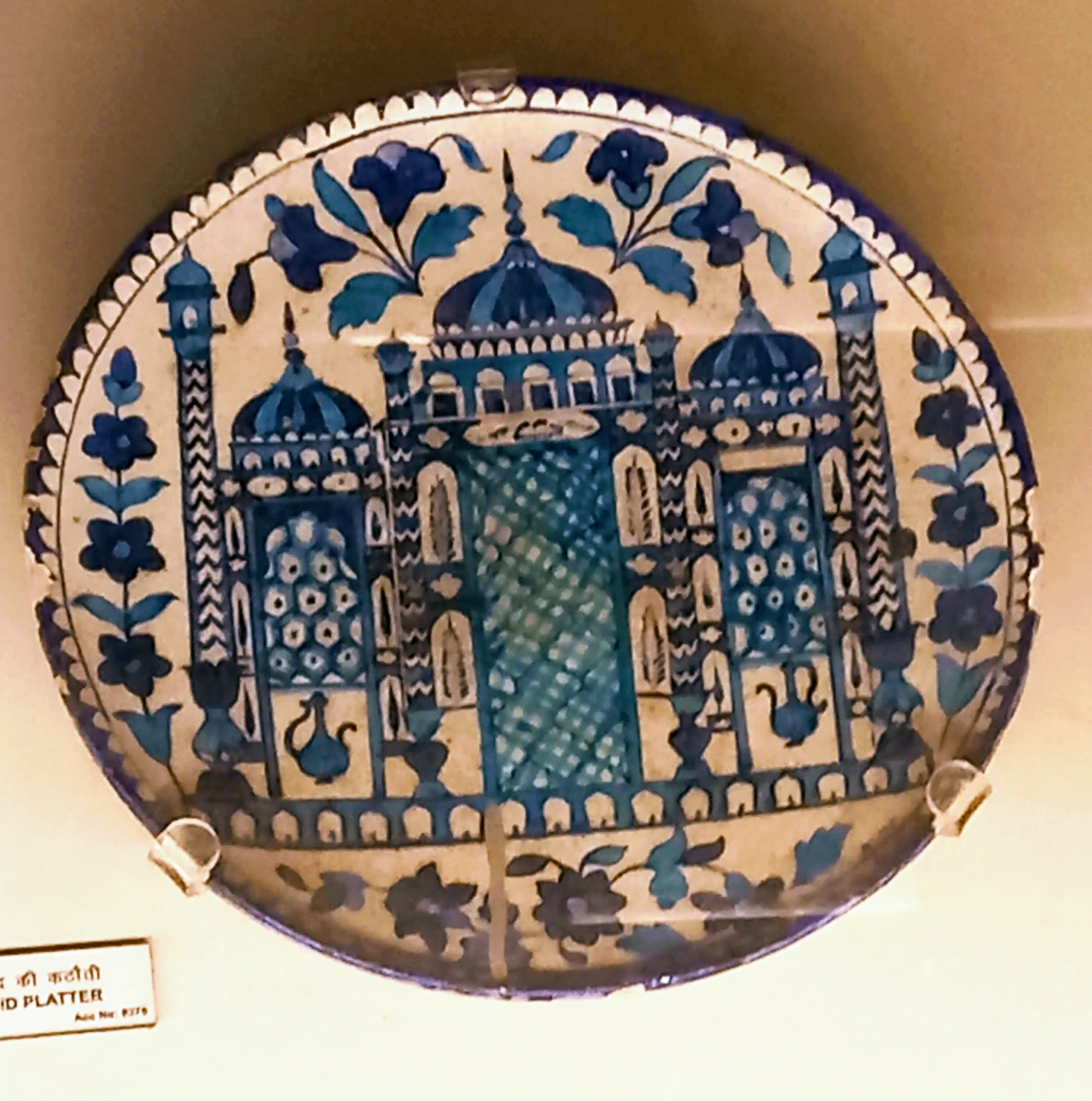
Pottery depicting Islamic Architecture

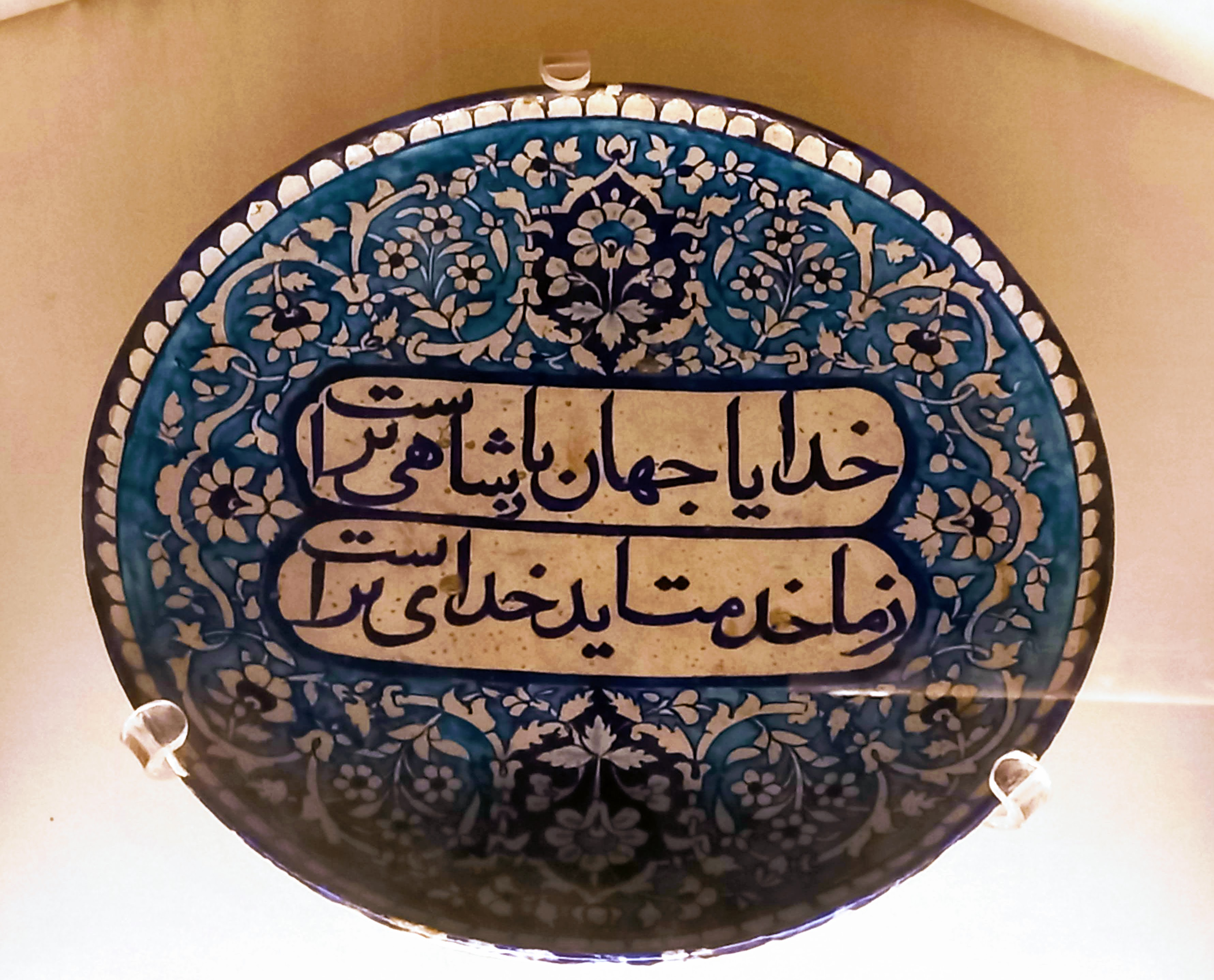
Pottery with Urdu Couplets

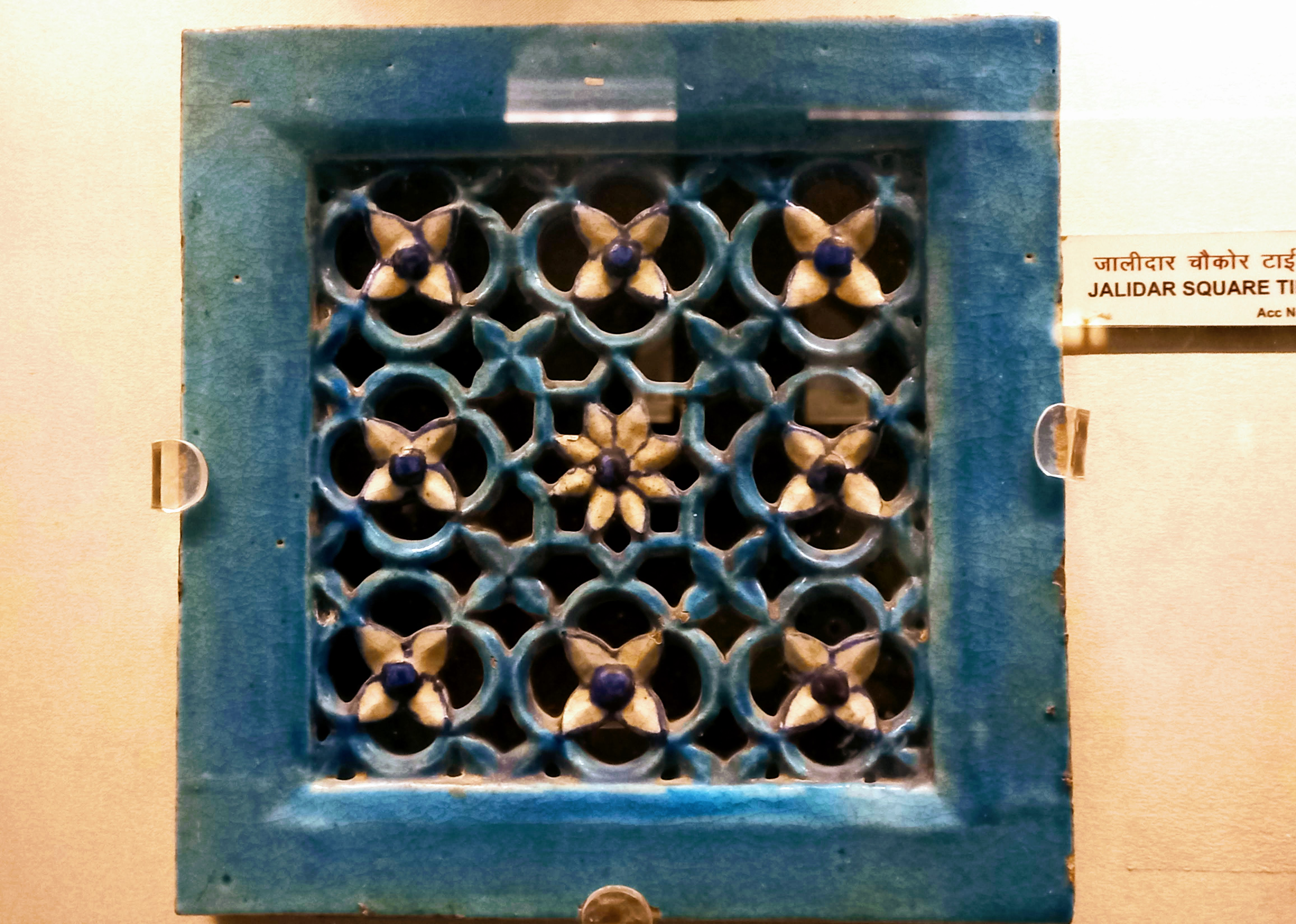
Jalidar square

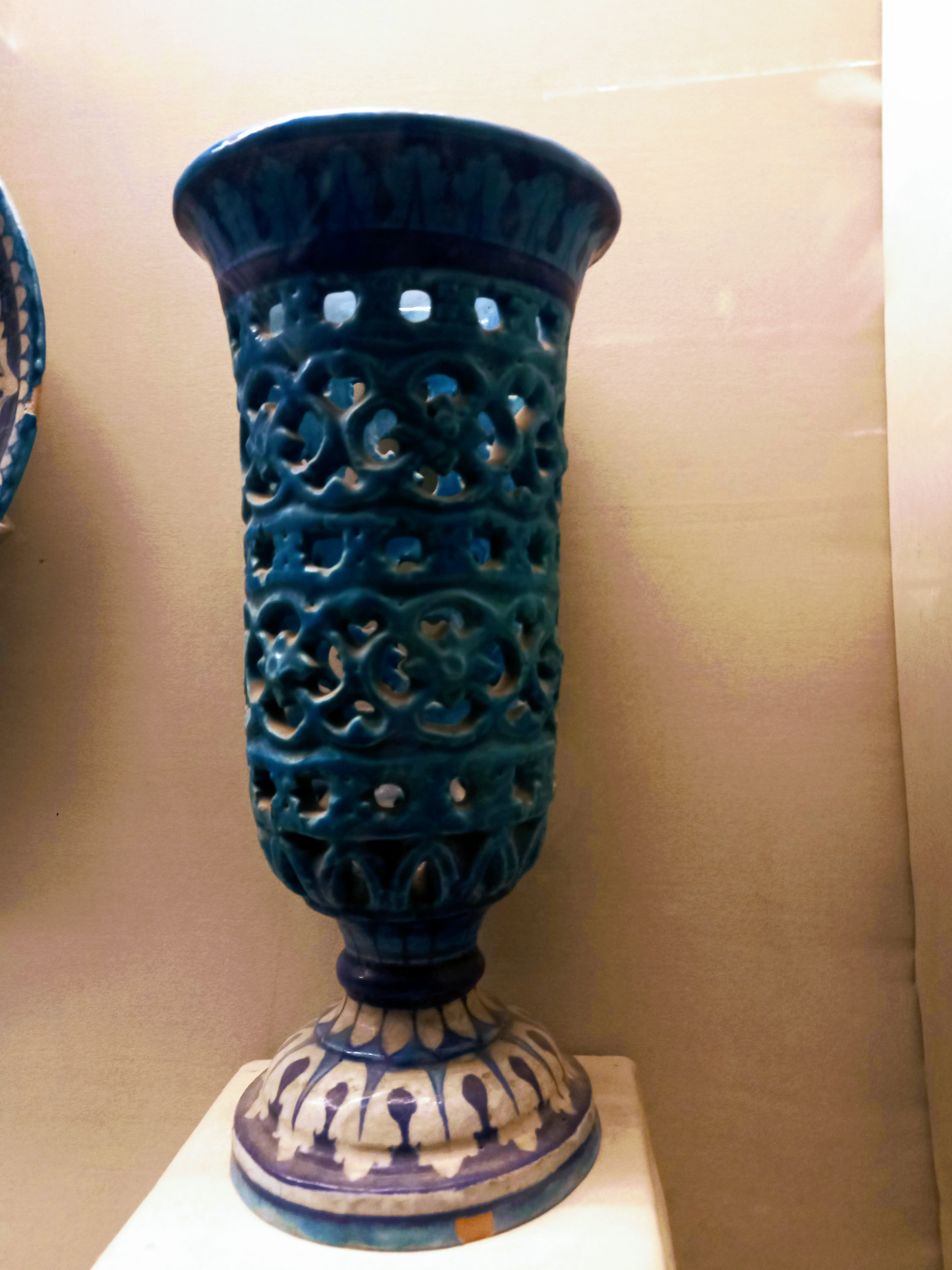
Peshawar Pottery

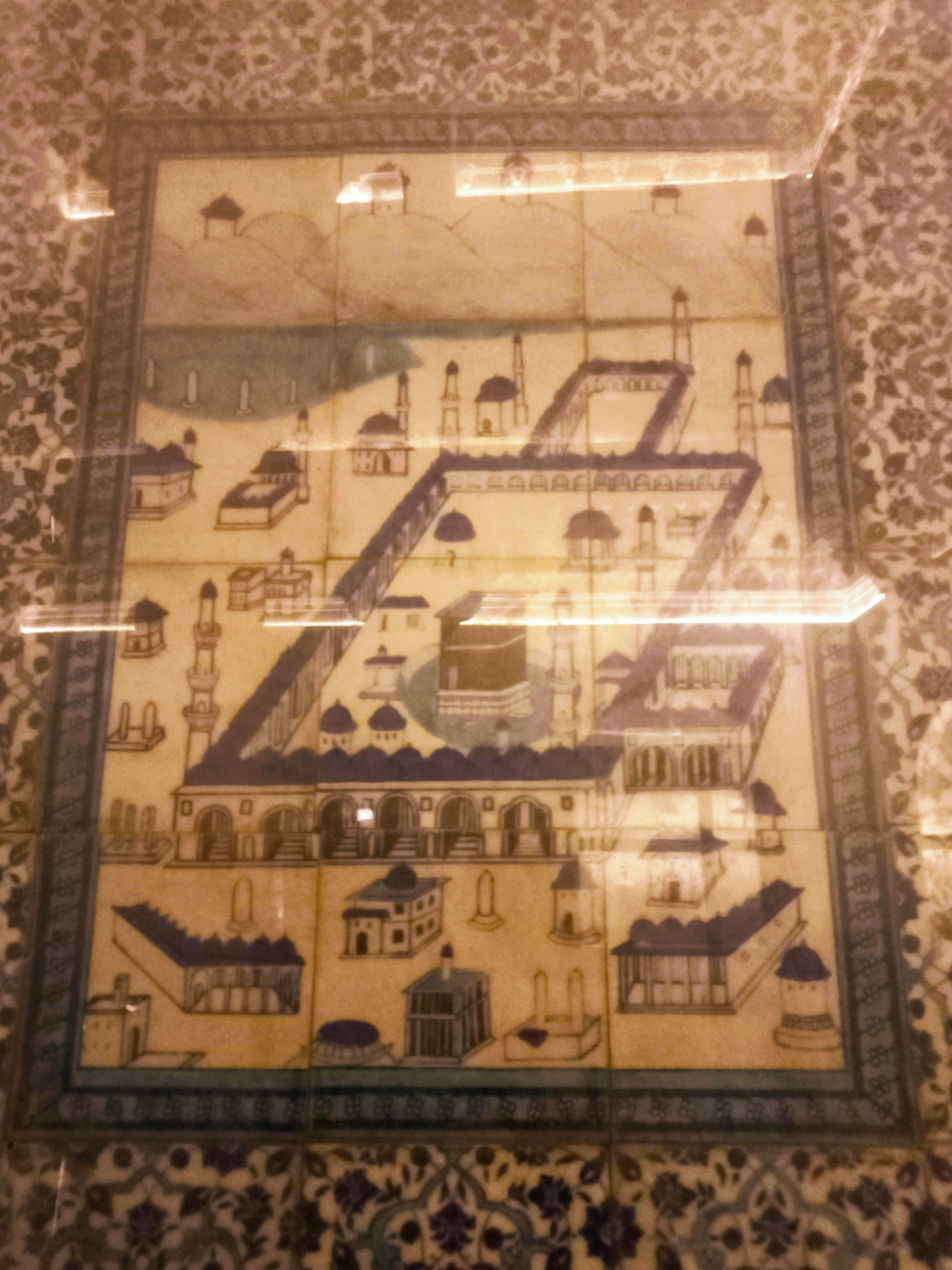
Kaba on Tiles

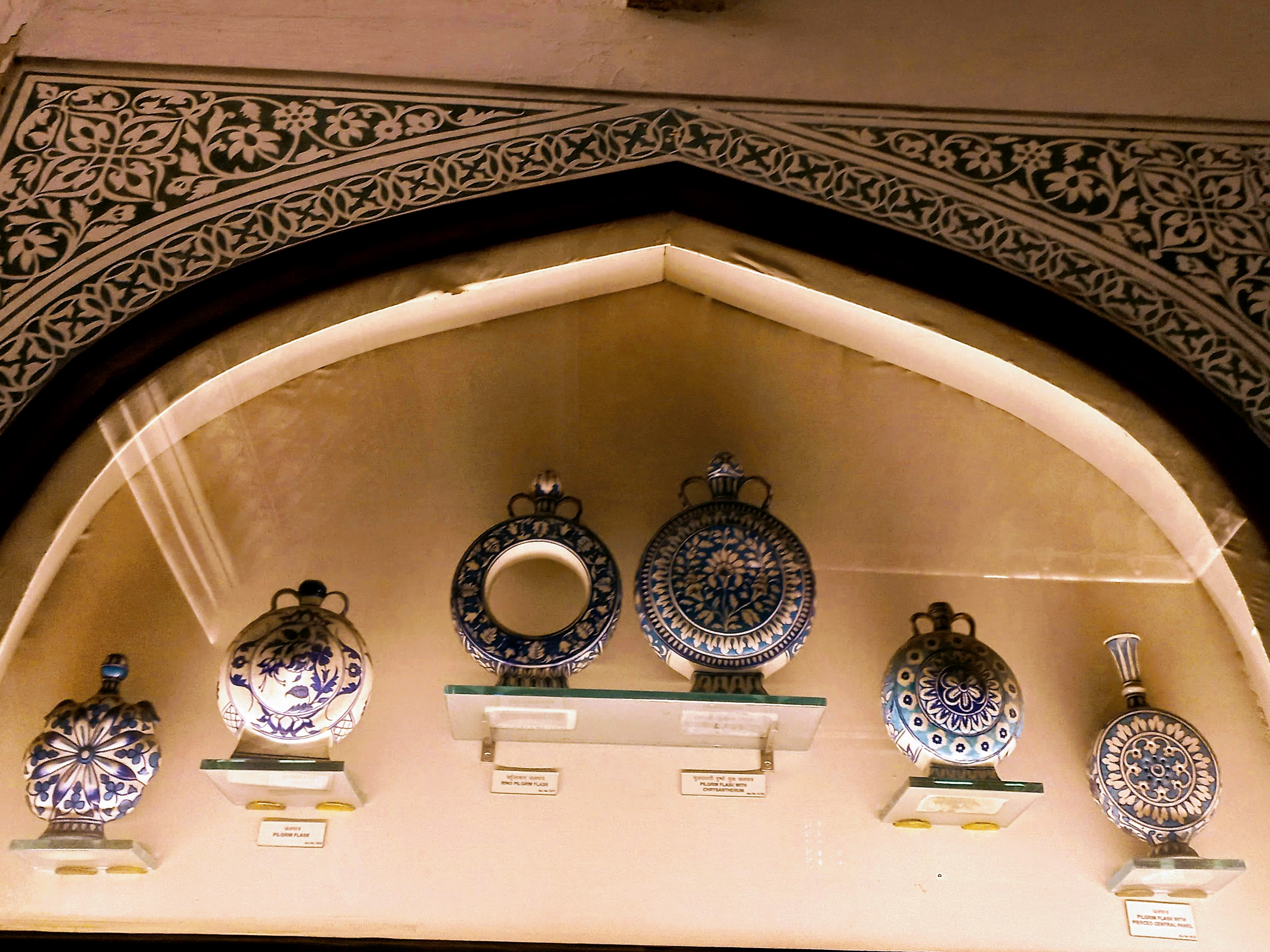
Turkish and Persian Pottery

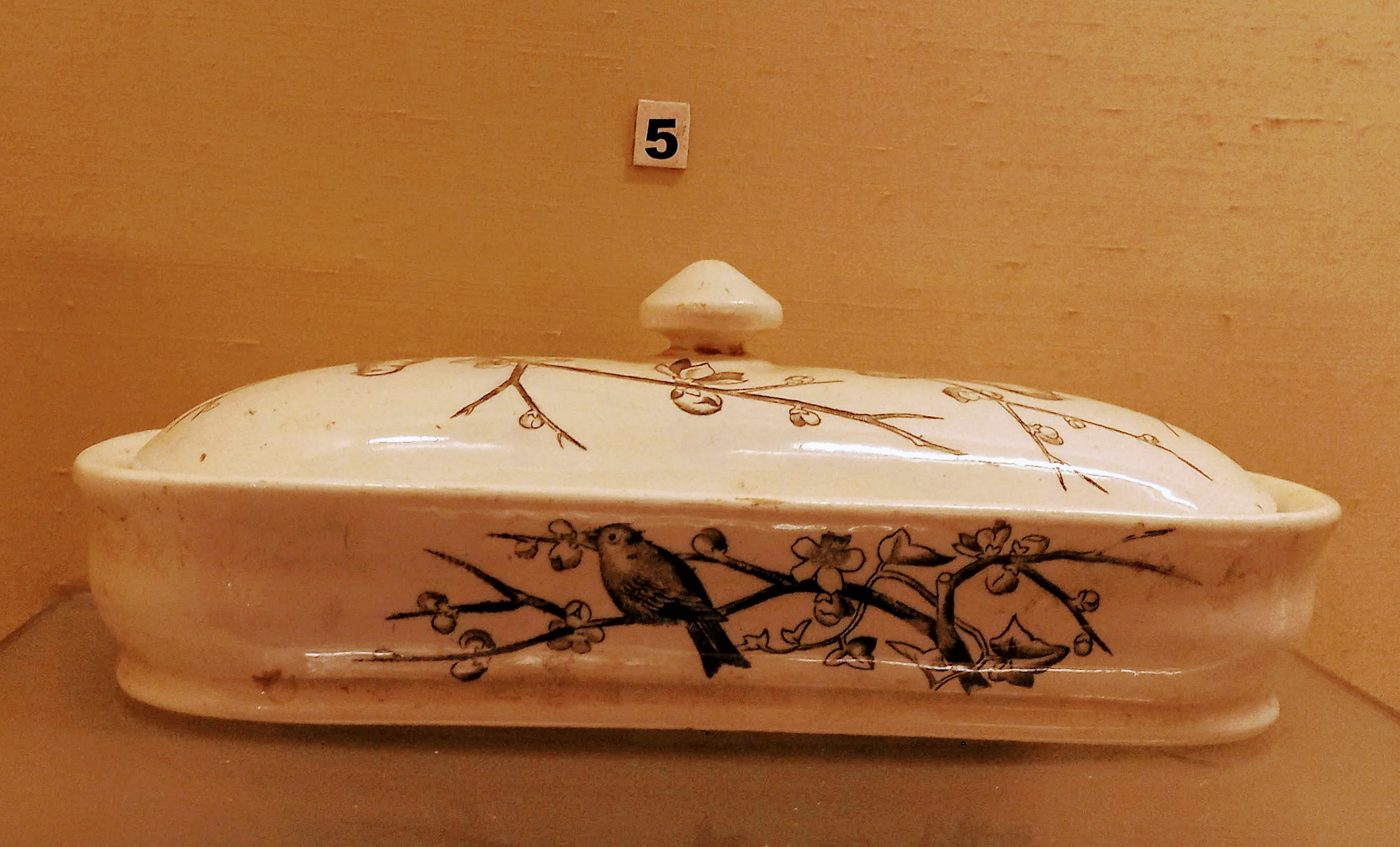
English Ceramics, Queen's Ware

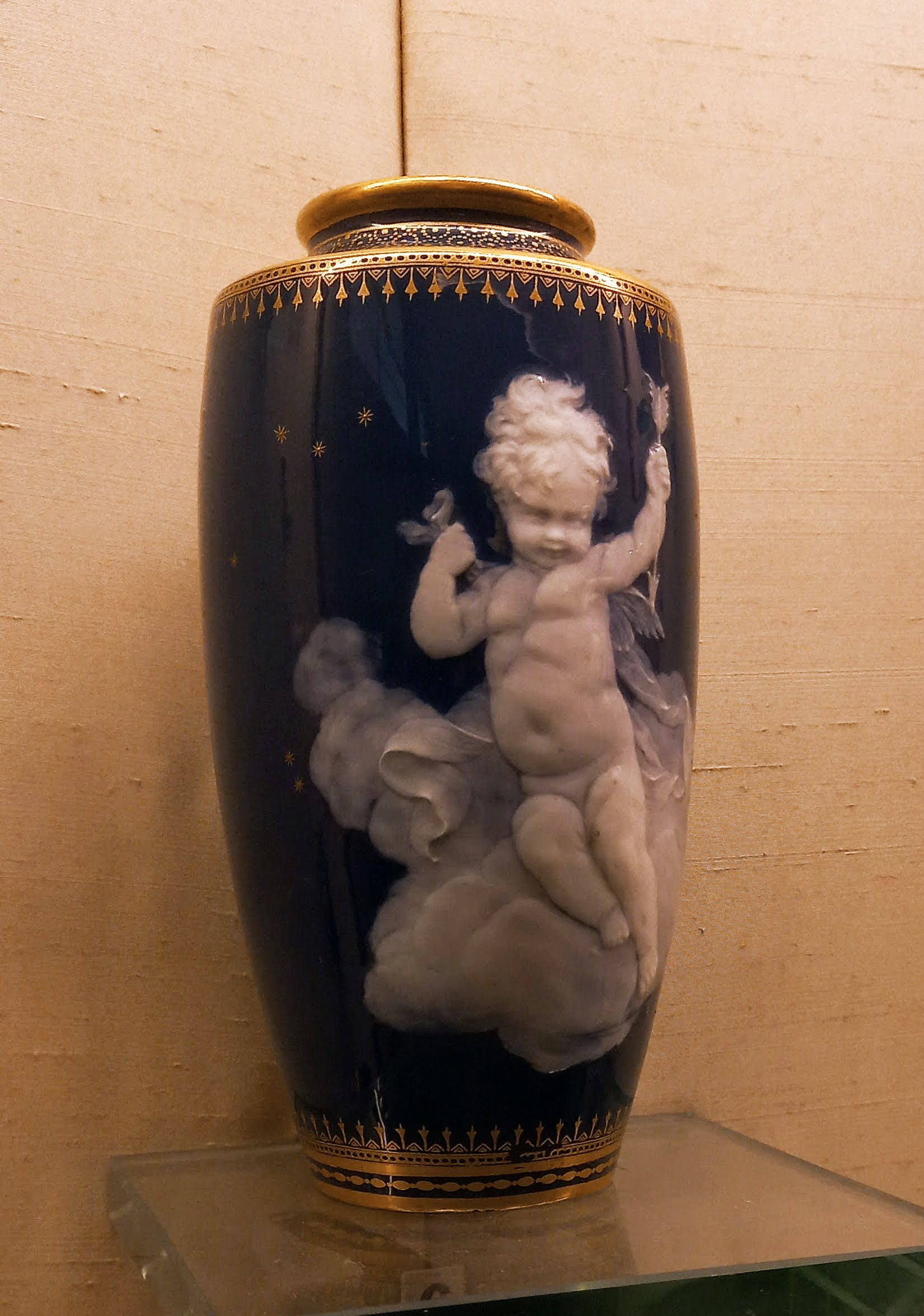
Pottery with Graeco-Roman motifs

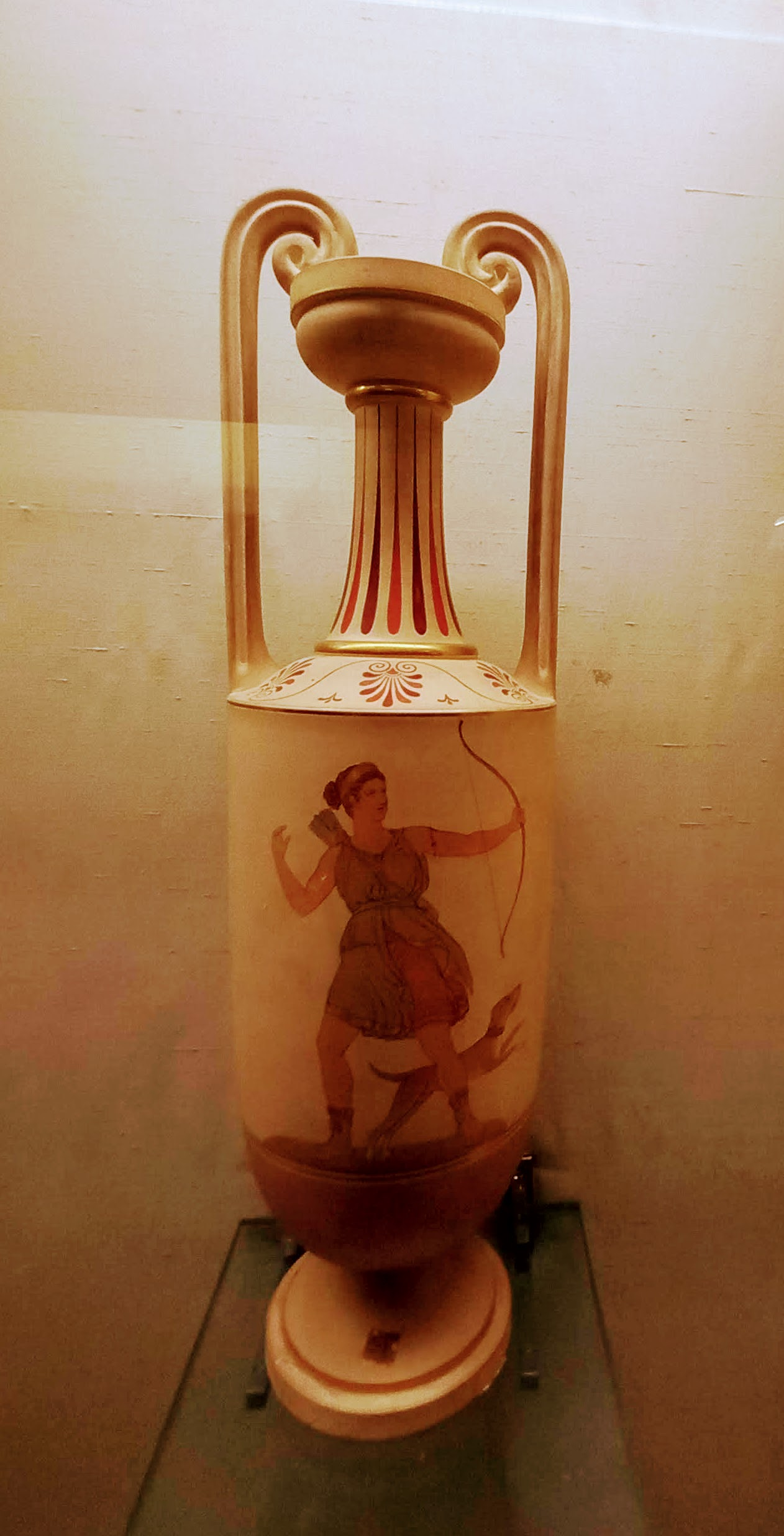
Ipsen Pottery

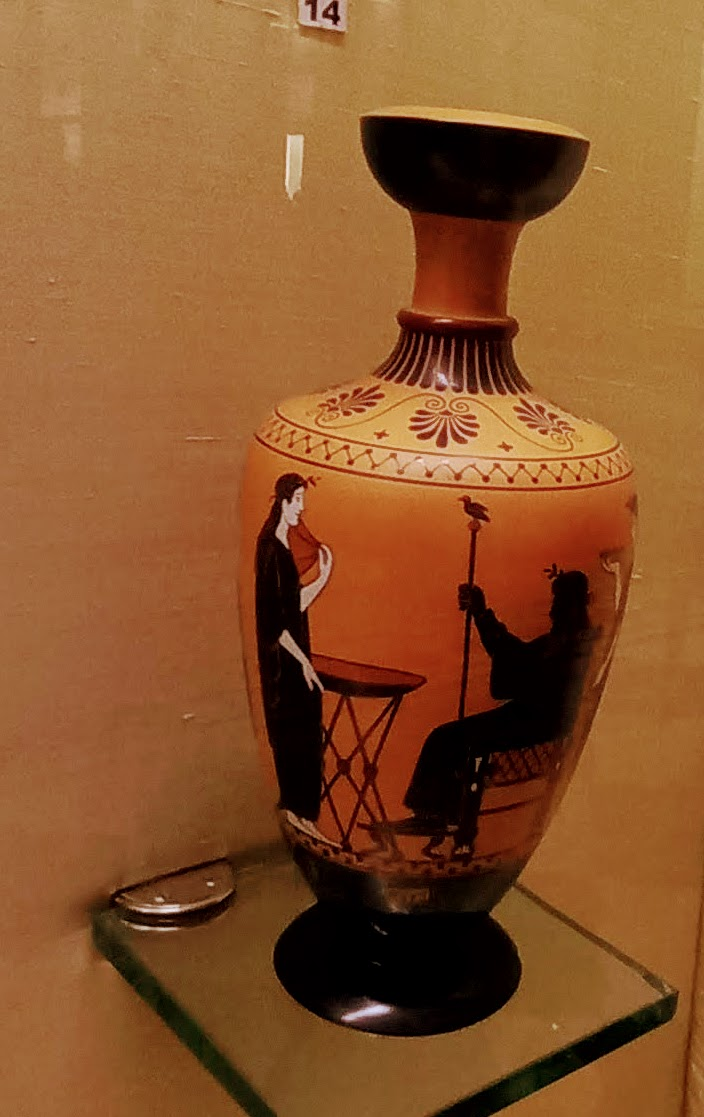
Etruscan Vase

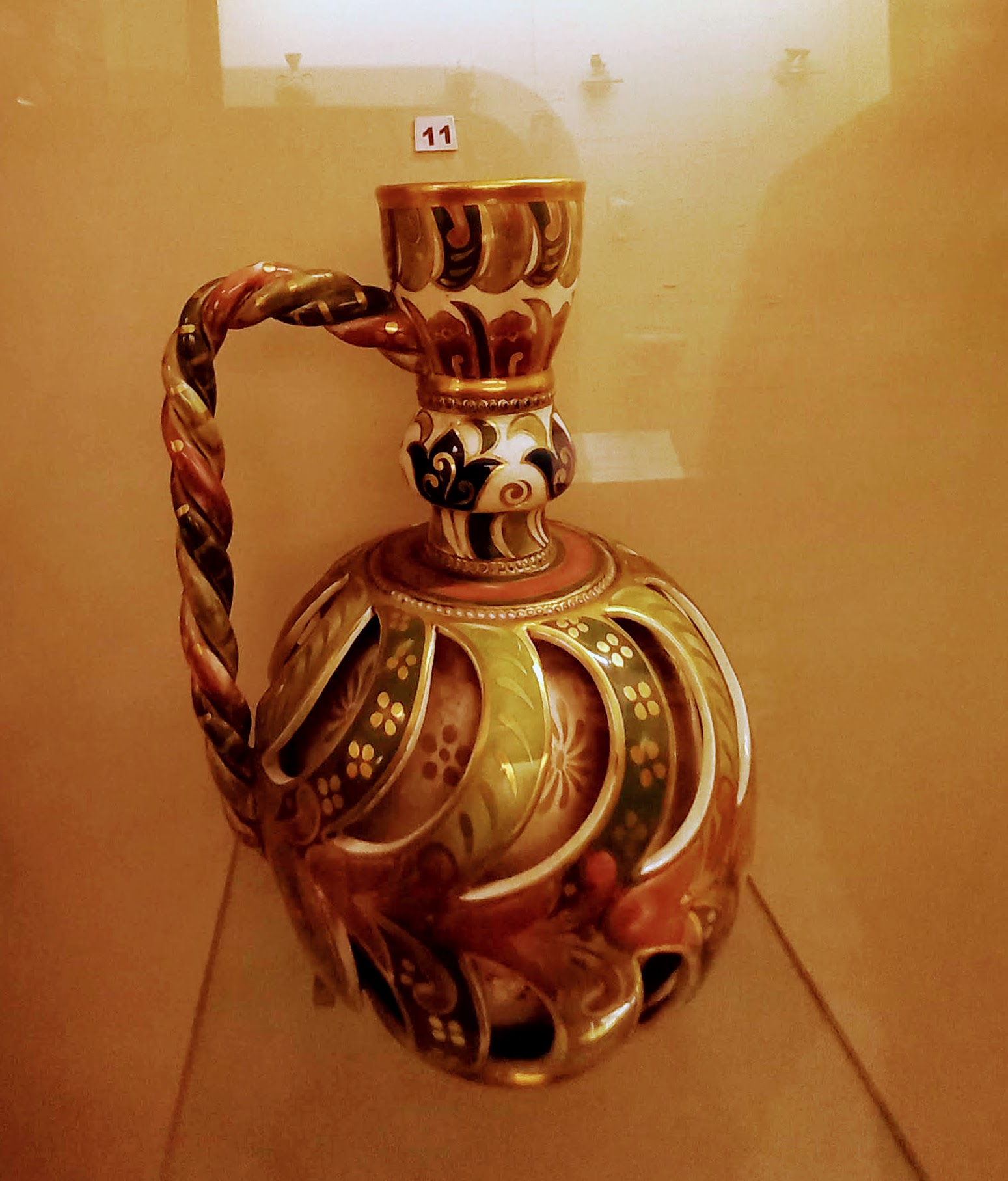
Hungarian Pottery

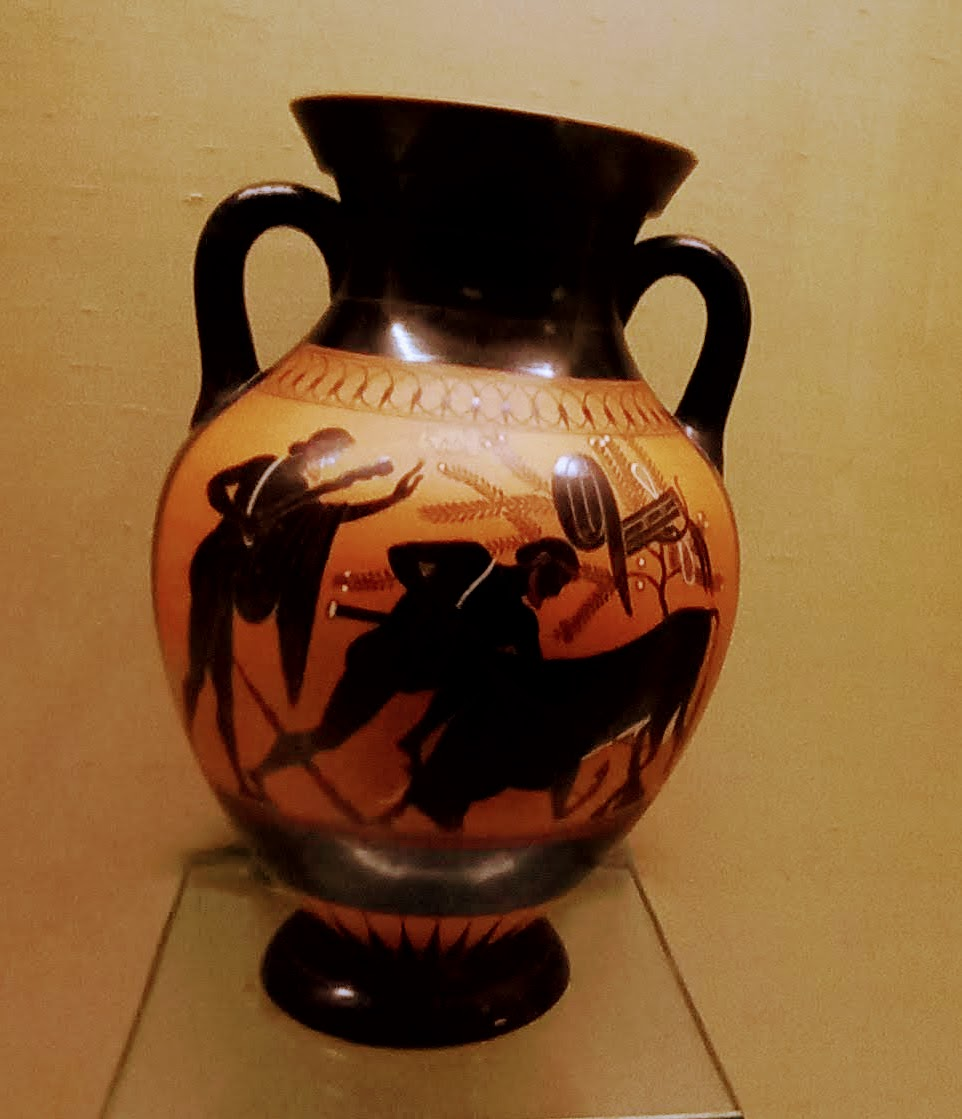
Danish Amphora

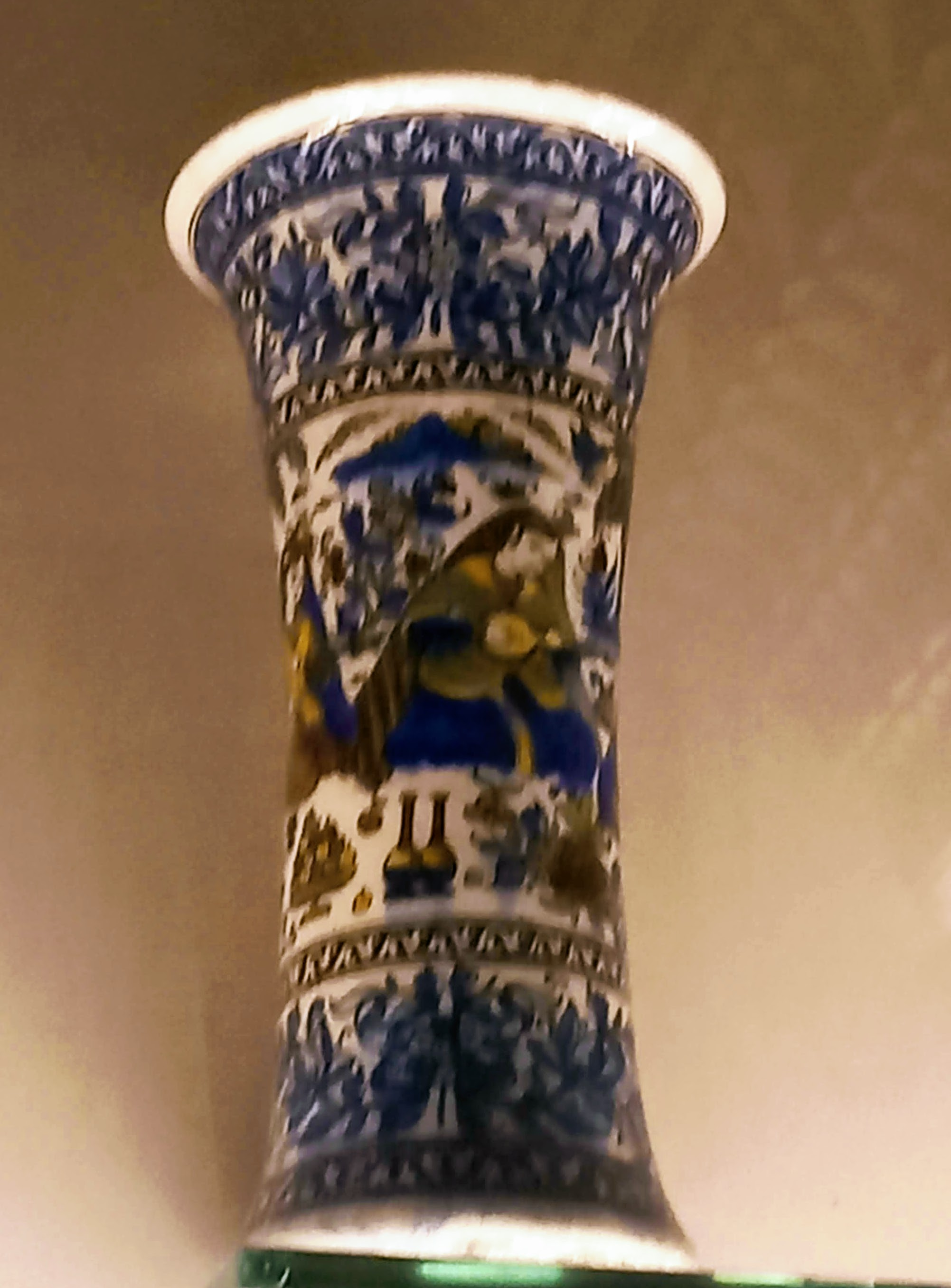
Persian Pottery

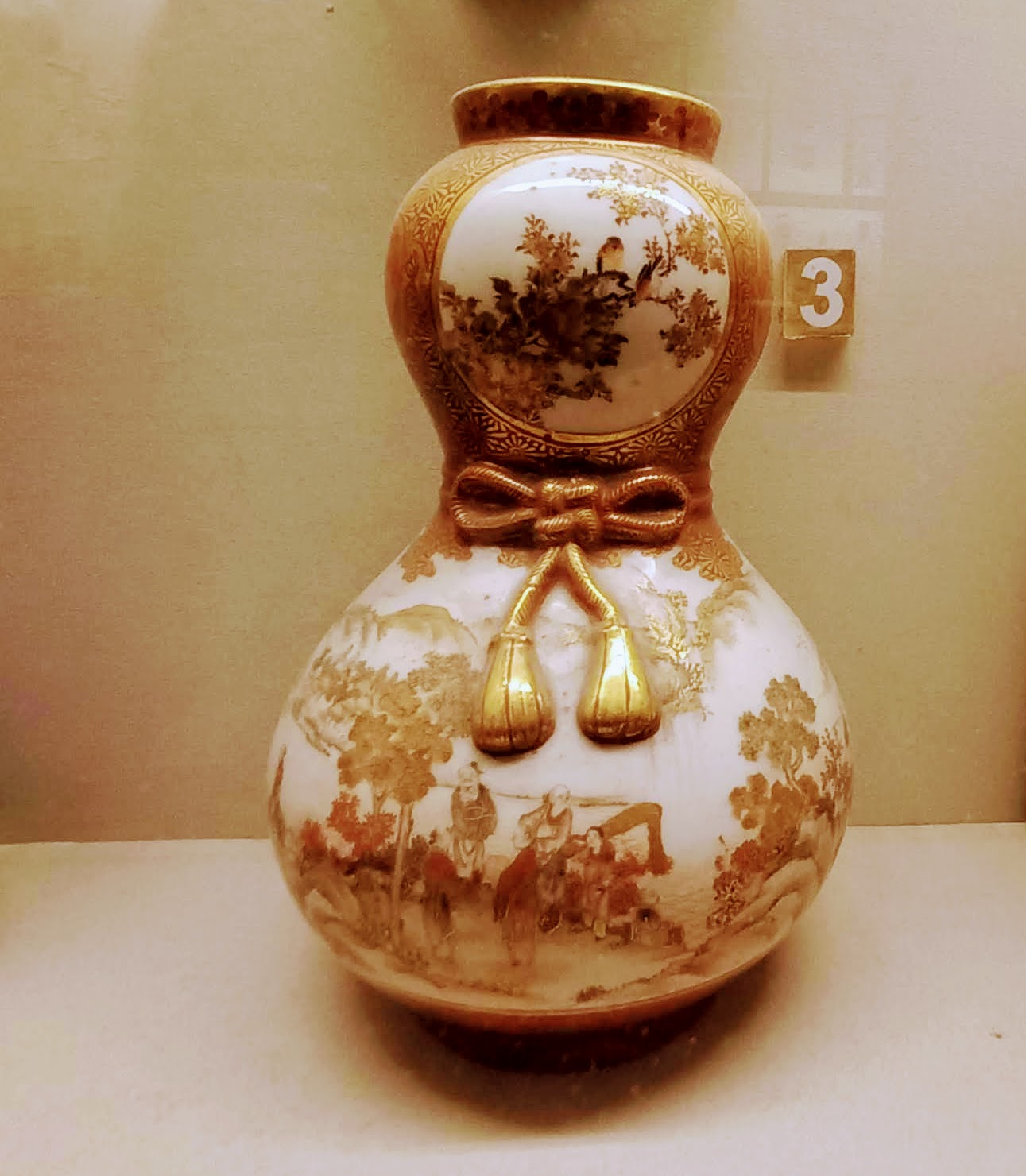
Japanese vase

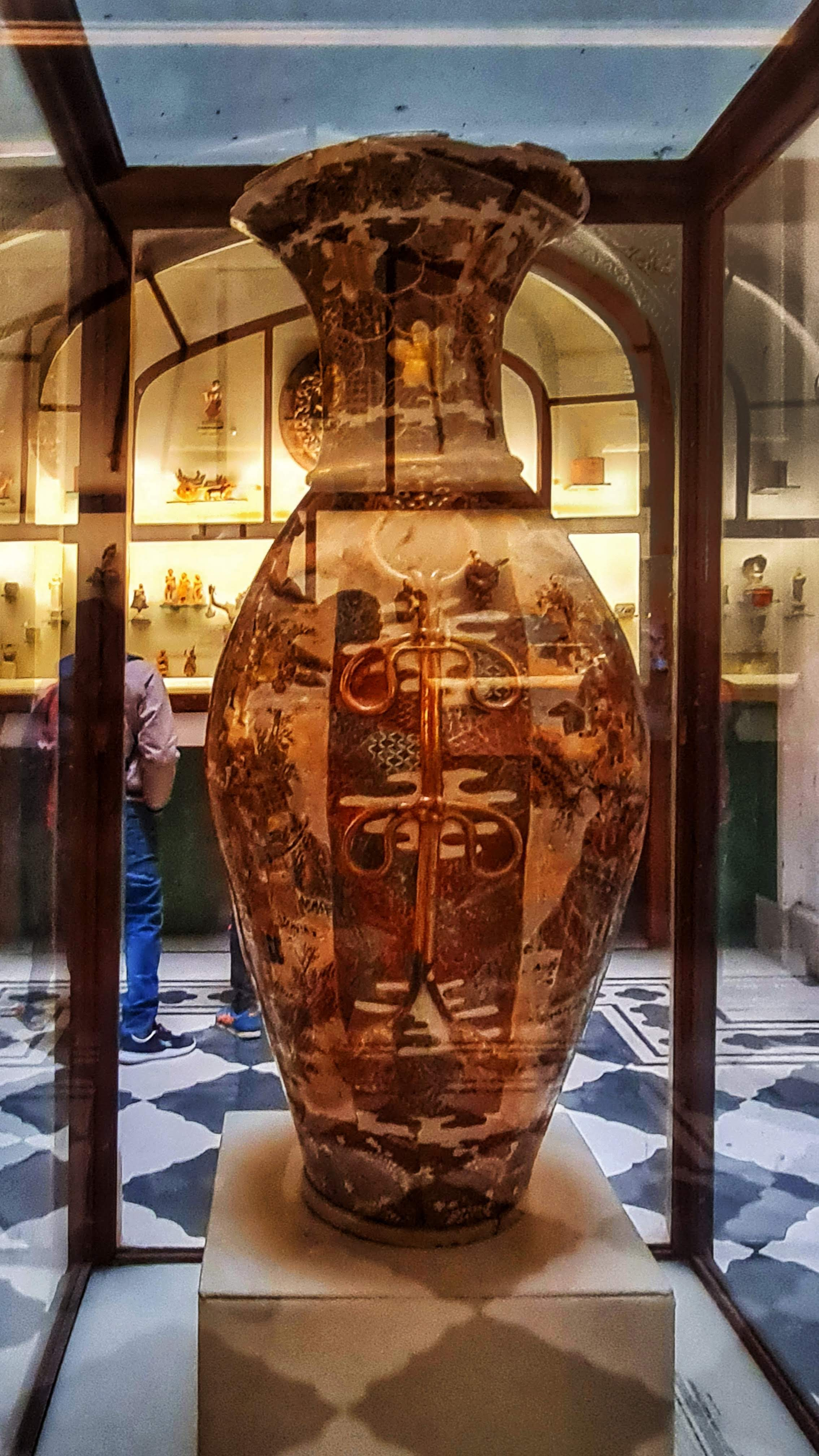
Satsuma Vase

== Contribution and legacy ==
The collection includes items collected from various places as well as replicas of inaccessible pieces that were made in a designated workshop. The collection documents the historical impact of colonial policies on the craft of pottery and the preservation of local traditions as well as the evolution of new techniques in Indian pottery.
